= 516th Aeronautical Systems Wing =

- Country: United States
- Branch: United States Air Force
- Type: Aeronautical Systems
- Part of: Air Force Materiel Command

Insignia
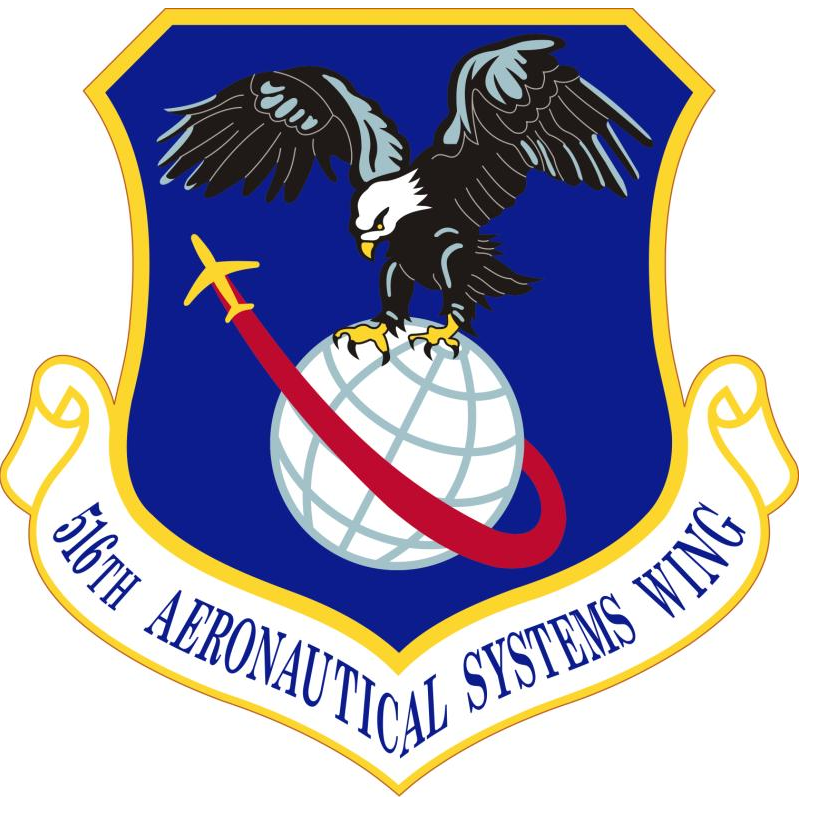
- 516th Aeronautical Systems Wing emblem

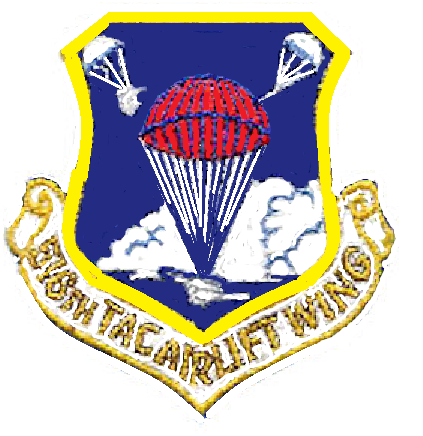
- 516th Troop Carrier Wing emblem (Approved 9 September 1954)

The 516th Aeronautical Systems Wing is an inactive wing of the United States Air Force. It was last assigned to the Aeronautical Systems Center of Air Force Materiel Command at Wright-Patterson Air Force Base, Ohio. The 516th was responsible for modernization, development, test, production, deployment and sustainment of new and existing aircraft systems to meet Air Mobility Command, Air Force Reserve Command, Air National Guard, and special operations forces in global mobility mission areas. The wing managed a $16.9 billion budget.

The wing was first activated at Memphis Municipal Airport, Tennessee in the Air Force Reserve in June 1949. In 1951, it was mobilized for the Korean War. In January 1953, the wing was inactivated and its resources were transferred to the regular 463d Troop Carrier Wing, which was simultaneously activated and assumed its personnel and equipment. The wing was again organized in 1963, when it assumed the resources of the 64th Troop Carrier Wing at Dyess Air Force Base, Texas. It trained airlift crews, deployed squadrons to overseas locations and participated in military exercises until inactivating in June 1972.

== History ==
=== Airlift Operations ===
Assigned to the reserves in the 1949 conversion to the Wing Base reorganization as the 516th Troop Carrier Wing, the wing performed reserve troop carrier training under the supervision of the 2584th Air Force Reserve Training Center at Memphis Municipal Airport, Tennessee until April 1951. Upon entering active duty in place that month the wing assumed responsibility for operating and maintaining the USAF portion of the Memphis airport and participated in tactical exercises and worldwide airlift. The wing converted from Curtiss C-46 Commando to Fairchild C-119 Flying Boxcar aircraft in 1952. It was replaced by 463d Troop Carrier Wing in January 1953.

The wing replaced the 64th Troop Carrier Wing at Dyess Air Force Base, Texas in January 1963. Until it was replaced by 463d Tactical Airlift Wing in June 1972, it performed worldwide tactical airlift and participated in a constant stream of tactical exercises and operations. The wing frequently deployed squadrons overseas to Europe, the Far East, and the Canal Zone. It conducted de Havilland Canada C-7 Caribou combat crew training in addition to other missions from August 1969 to May 1972 for USAF personnel and for three months in 1971 for South Vietnamese crews. It was inactivated on 1 June 1972.

=== Systems Development Operations ===
Three of the wing's groups focused on specific airlift aircraft. The 516th Aeronautical Systems Group directed the modernization, development, test, production, deployment and sustainment of C-17 aircraft, F117 engine, support, and training systems. This Department of Defense airlift program provides vital airlift capability in support of U.S. national interests. Its 716th Aeronautical Systems Group directed the modernization, development, test, production, deployment and plans for sustainment of C-5 aircraft, support and training systems. This Department of Defense airlift modernization program provides strategic airlift capability in support of U.S. national interests. And its 866th Aeronautical Systems Group directed the modernization, development, test, production, deployment and plans for sustainment of the C-130 aircraft, support, and training systems. This Department of Defense airlift program provides tactical airlift capability in support of U.S. national interests.

Its other group, the 836th Aeronautical Systems Group directed the development, test, production, deployment and sustainment of KC-10 Aircraft Modernization and KC-135 Replacement Tanker aircraft, support, and training systems programs. These programs provide strategic mobility and force enabling capability to Air Mobility Command in support of U.S. national interests and worldwide readiness support. Prior to June 2008, this mission was performed by the Tanker Systems Modernization Systems Squadron (later 653d Aeronautical Systems Squadron).

Two systems squadrons were also assigned directly to the group. The 654th Aeronautical Systems Squadron directed the development, test, production, deployment and plans for sustainment of the Large Aircraft Infrared Counter Measures system for both transport and tanker aircraft. This Department of Defense program develops advanced missile warning systems and countermeasures. Its 655th Aeronautical Systems Squadron directed the acquisition, modernization, deployment and sustainment of a fleet of leased and purchased aircraft for the operational support airlift/very important person special air mission (OSA/VIPSAM) that included the C-32A, C-37A/B, C-40B/C, and E-10. The program supports Air Mobility Command, Air National Guard, and Air Force Reserve missions providing support airlift and communications capability to our nation's leaders.

== Lineage ==
516th Tactical Airlift Wing

- Constituted as 516th Troop Carrier Wing, Medium on 10 May 1949

Activated in the reserve on 26 June 1949
Ordered to active service on 16 April 1951
Inactivated on 16 January 1953

- Activated on 19 July 1962 (not organized)

Organized on 1 January 1963
Redesignated 516th Troop Carrier Wing on 1 March 1966
Redesignated 516th Tactical Airlift Wing on 1 May 1967
Inactivated on 1 June 1972

- Consolidated with the Mobility Systems Wing as Mobility Systems Wing on 23 June 2006

516th Aeronautical Systems Wing

- Constituted as Mobility Systems Wing on 23 November 2004

Activated on 18 January 2005
Consolidated with the 516th Tactical Airlift Wing on 23 June 2006
Redesignated 516th Aeronautical Systems Wing on 14 July 2006
Inactivated on 30 June 2010

=== Assignments ===
- Fourteenth Air Force, 26 June 1949

Tactical Air Command, 17 April 1951

- Tactical Air Command, 19 July 1962 (not organized)

Twelfth Air Force, 1 January 1963
839th Air Division, 1 July 1963
838th Air Division, 9 November 1964
Twelfth Air Force, 24 December 1969
834th Air Division, 15 March – 1 June 1972

- Aeronautical Systems Center, 18 January 2005 – 30 June 2010

=== Stations ===
- Memphis Municipal Airport, Tennessee, 26 June 1949 – 16 January 1953
- Dyess Air Force Base, Texas, 1 January 1963 – 1 June 1972
- Wright-Patterson Air Force Base, Ohio, 18 January 2005 – 30 June 2010

=== Components ===
Groups

- 516th Troop Carrier Group: 26 June 1949 – 16 January 1953 (consolidated with C-17 Systems Group on 23 June 2006)
- 836th Aeronautical Systems Group, 30 June 2008 – 30 June 2010
- C-5 Systems Group (later 716th Aeronautical Systems Group): 18 January 2005 – 30 June 2010
- C-17 Systems Group (later 516th Aeronautical Systems Group): 18 January 2005 – 30 June 2010
- C-130 Systems Group (later 866th Aeronautical Systems Group): 18 January 2005 – 30 June 2010

Squadrons

- 17th Troop Carrier Squadron: 1 January 1963 – 15 June 1964
- 18th Troop Carrier Squadron (later 18th Tactical Airlift Training Squadron): 1 January – 1 June 1963; 15 October 1969 – 1 June 1972
- 345th Troop Carrier Squadron: 8 January 1963 – 27 November 1965
- 346th Troop Carrier Squadron (later 346th Tactical Airlift Squadron): 1 April 1963 – 15 March 1969 (detached 1 July – c. 1 September 1964, 5 February – 30 May 1968)
- 347th Troop Carrier Squadron (later 347th Tactical Airlift Squadron): 1 July 1963 – 1 June 1972 (detached 18 May—c. 20 July 1964, 22 June – 27 September 1967, 27 – 11 January March 1968, 15 June – 15 October 1968, 25 February – 28 May 1969, 13 June – 3 September 1969, 3 February – 10 April 1970, 7 September – 11 November 1970, 4 June – 10 August 1971, 4 February – 17 April 1972)
- 348th Tactical Airlift Squadron: 5 July 1968 – 1 June 1972 (detached 15 October 1968 – 10 January 1969, 1 September – 13 November 1969, 5 May – 7 July 1970, 5 January – 10 March 1971, 5 October – 17 December 1971, 8 May—1 June 1972)
- 4449th Combat Crew Training Squadron: 27 August – 15 October 1969
- Commercial Derivatives Systems Squadron (later 655th Aeronautical Systems Squadron): 18 January 2005 – 30 June 2010
- Large Aircraft Infrared Countermeasures Systems Squadron (later 654th Aeronautical Systems Squadron): 18 January 2005 – 30 June 2010
- Tanker Systems Modernization Systems Squadron (later 653d Aeronautical Systems Squadron): 18 January 2005 – 30 June 2008

=== Aircraft ===
- T-7, 1949–1951
- T-11, 1949–1951
- C-46, 1949–1953
- C-119, 1952–1953
- C-130, 1963–1972
- C-7, 1969–1972
