= 345th Airlift Squadron =

345th Airlift Squadron

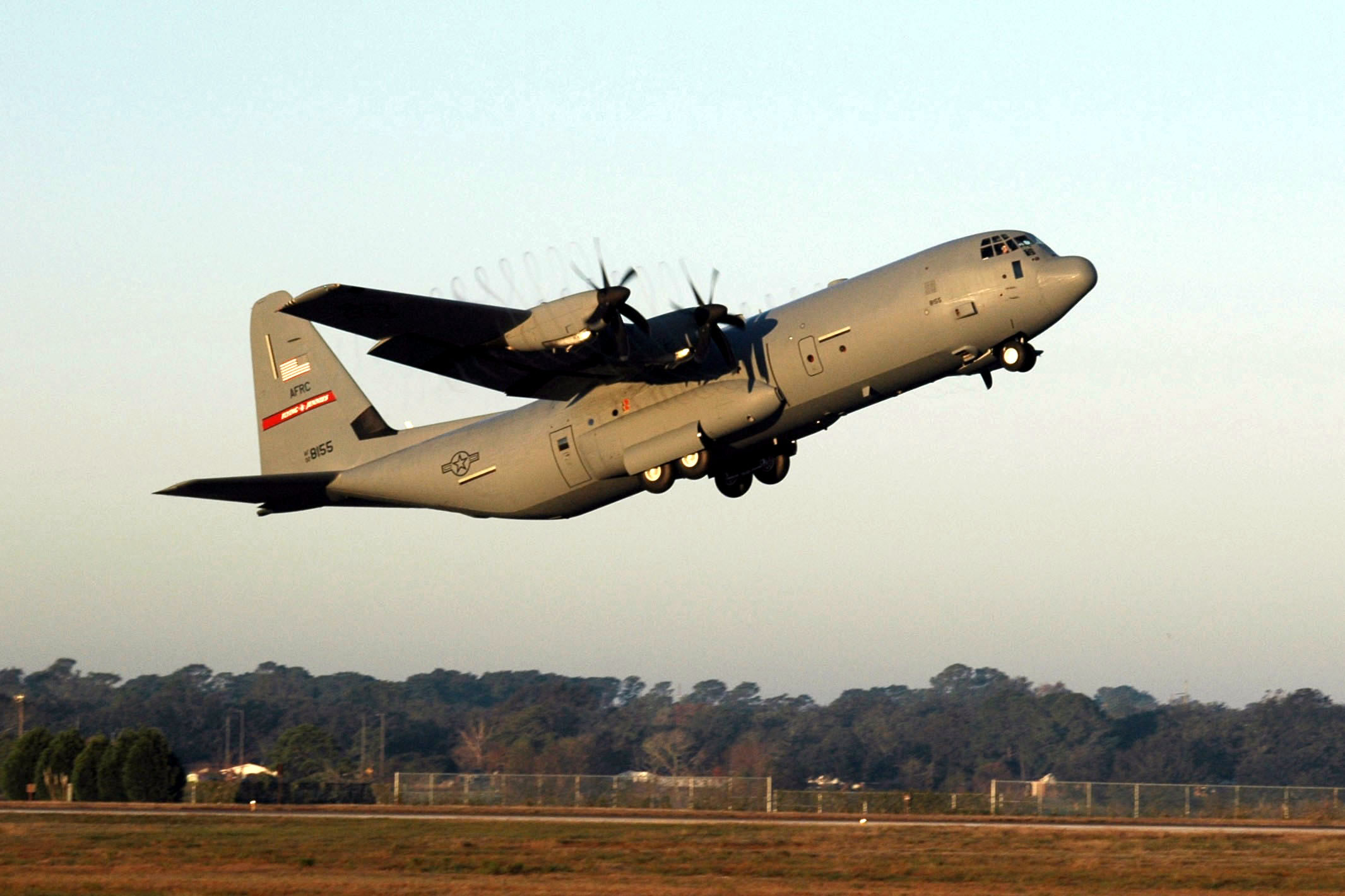
- C-130J taking off from Keesler Air Force Base, Mississippi
- Country: United States
- Branch: United States Air Force
- Role: Airlift
- Part of: Air Mobility Command
- Garrison/HQ: Keesler Air Force Base, Mississippi
- Nickname: Golden Eagles
- Motto: Accedere Totaliter Latin Complete Compliance in All Things
- Engagements: Gulf War
- Decorations: Air Force Outstanding Unit Award w/Combat "V" Device; Air Force Outstanding Unit Award; Philippine Republic Presidential Unit Citation; Vietnamese Gallantry Cross with Palm

Insignia
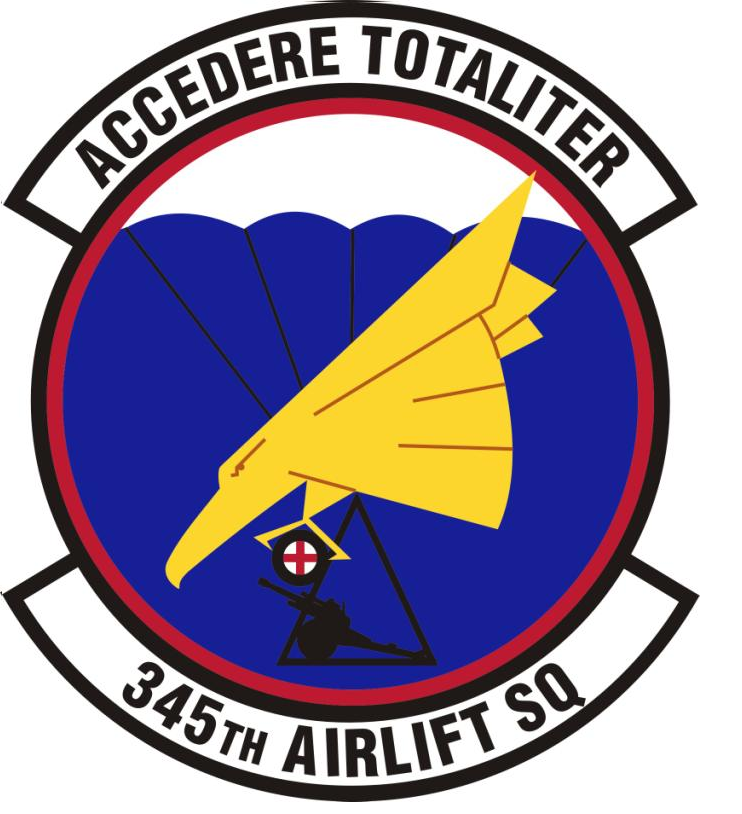
- 345th Airlift Squadron emblem (approved 24 May 1957)

The 345th Airlift Squadron is an inactive United States Air Force squadron most recently assigned to the 19th Operations Group at Keesler Air Force Base, Mississippi, where it was inactivated in June 2014. The squadron was activated in the summer of 2010 as an "active duty associate" squadron, jointly operating the Lockheed C-130J Hercules aircraft of the 815th Airlift Squadron.

The squadron was first activated as the 345th Troop Carrier Squadron in the Air Force Reserve in 1949 and trained at Memphis Municipal Airport, Tennessee. In 1951 it was called to active duty for the Korean War and served until 1953.

In 1955, the unit was activated at Sewart Air Force Base, Tennessee as a rotary wing troop carrier assault unit in a test of the USAF's ability to support United States Army assault operations. It participated in Operation Sage Brush, which was, in part, a test of this concept. The squadron was inactivated the following year and its aircraft distributed to helicopter support organizations. A few months later the squadron was activated as a fixed wing troop carrier assault unit at Sewart and equipped with Fairchild C-123 Provider aircraft. It continued to fly the Provider until 1961 when it converted to the Lockheed C-130 Hercules. It has continued to fly various models of the Hercules ever since.

In 1962, the squadron was moved to the Pacific area and came under the control of the 315th Air Division, which managed airlift resources for Pacific Air Forces. The squadron returned on paper to the United States a few months later and its personnel and equipment were transferred to another squadron. The 345th returned to the Pacific in 1965 and began to deploy C-130s to Southeast Asia, and in 1966 moved from Okinawa to Ching Chuan Kang Air Base, where it was assigned to the 314th Troop Carrier Wing. Following the end of the Viet Nam War, the squadron returned to Okinawa and served in the Pacific until it was inactivated in 1993.

== Mission ==
The mission of the 345th Airlift Squadron is to provide combat support to commanders through theater combat delivery of personnel and resupply worldwide. To perform its mission, the squadron conducts airland, aeromedical evacuation and tactical airdrop low level missions.

== History ==
=== Reserve training and Korean War callup ===
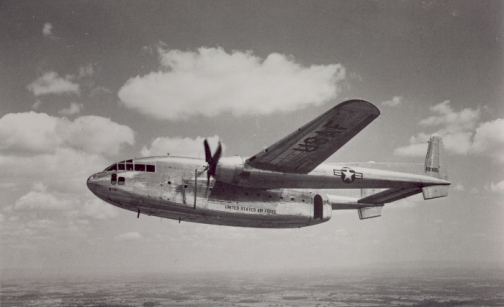
Fairchild C-119 Flying Boxcar

At Memphis Municipal Airport, Tennessee in June 1949 when Continental Air Command implemented the wing base organization, in which combat groups and all supporting units on a base were assigned to a single wing, for its reserve units. At Memphis, it was assigned to the 516th Troop Carrier Group, which absorbed most of the reservists from the inactivating 95th Bombardment Group. The squadron trained under the supervision of the 2584th Air Force Reserve Training Center at Memphis Municipal Airport, Tennessee until April 1951. The 345th was called to active duty that month and, along with other reserve troop carrier organizations mobilized for Tactical Air Command during the Korean War, formed the new Eighteenth Air Force. It participated in tactical exercises and worldwide airlift. It converted from Curtiss C-46 Commando to Fairchild C-119 Flying Boxcar aircraft in 1952. The 345th was inactivated and replaced by the 772d Troop Carrier Squadron in January 1953.

=== Helicopter assault operations ===
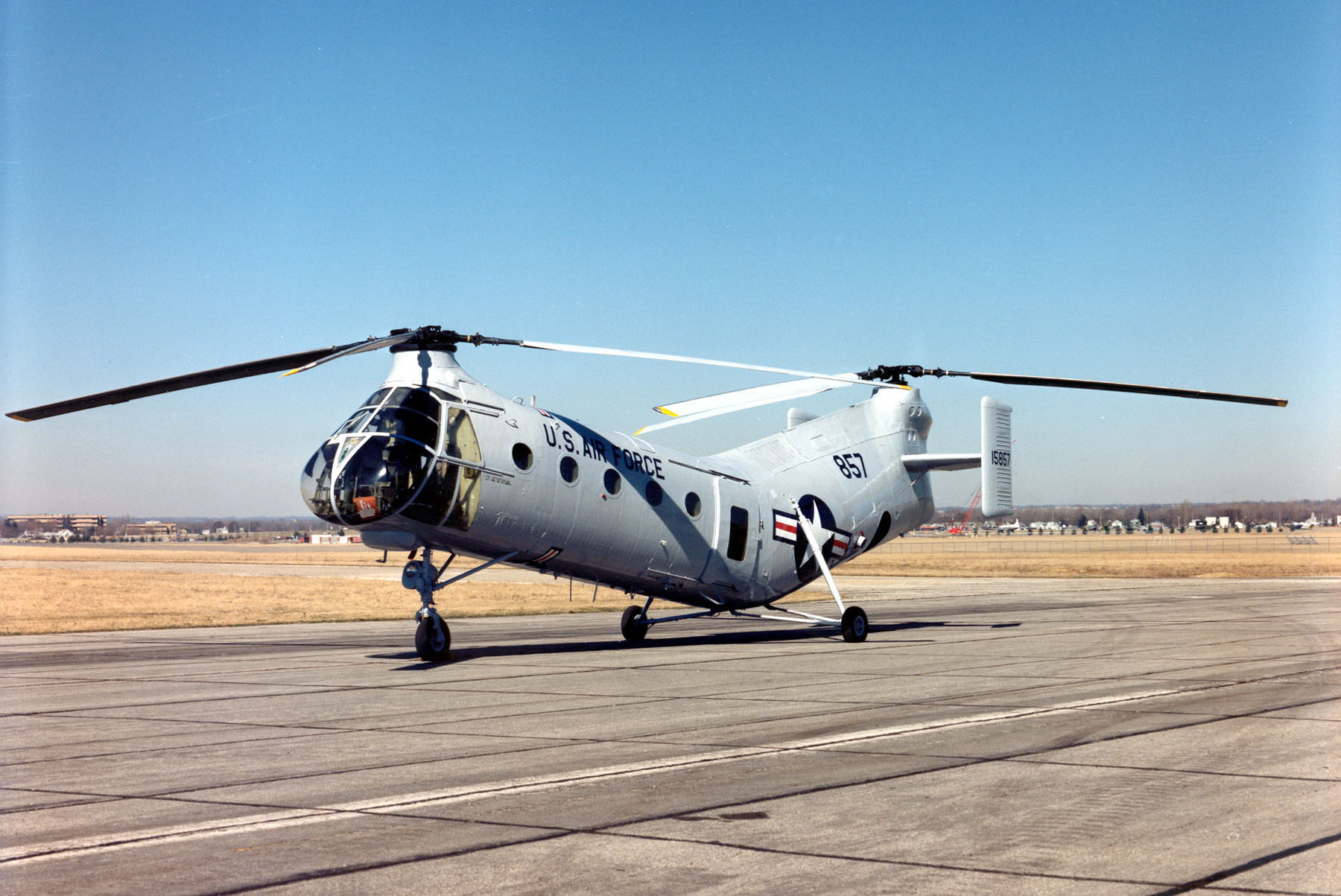
Piasecki H-21 Workhorse

The squadron was reactivated in 1955 and assigned to the 516th Troop Carrier Group at Sewart Air Force Base, Tennessee as the 345th Troop Carrier Squadron, Assault, Rotary Wing in part to test the United States Air Force's ability to provide helicopter airlift to the Army. The 345th was initially equipped with Sikorsky H-19 helicopters, but soon replaced them with Piasecki H-21s. Its operations included participation in Operation Backlash II, which was a survey mission to fix the location of radar sites and support the construction of the Mid-Canada Line. The group also tested the evacuation of key high ranking personnel from Washington DC in the event of a nuclear attack. The squadron collected radiological samples at the Nevada Test Site during atomic tests.

The conflict between the Army and the Air Force concerning the use of Air Force helicopters to support Army assault operations was tested in Operation Sage Brush. The 345th operated as part of the 20th Combat Airlift Division (Provisional) supporting Army Group Gulf', the aggressor force. The squadron's H-21s were dismantled and transported in Douglas C-124 Globemaster II aircraft in a test of air mobility. Following this test, the 345th was inactivated in July 1956. The helicopters of the squadron were transferred to the 20th Helicopter Squadron, whose mission was support for routine Air Force activities.

=== Fixed wing airlift in the United States ===
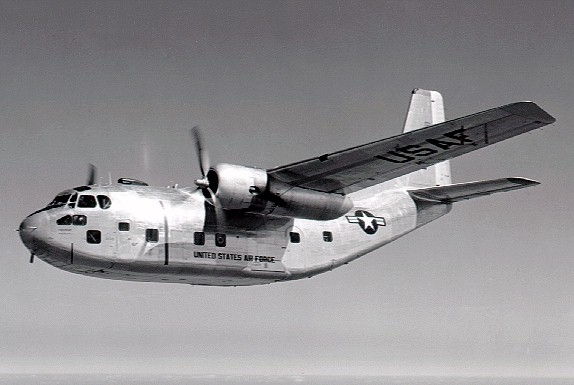
Fairchild C-123 Provider

Three months later, the squadron was reactivated at Sewart as a Fairchild C-123 Provider unit. The squadron trained to airlift troops, equipment and supplies into combat zones, to resupply forces, and evacuate casualties. In 1958, most of the C-123s at Sewart were transferred to Pope Air Force Base, North Carolina and the squadron's parent 513th Troop Carrier Wing was inactivated. However, the unit continued to fly Providers at Sewart until 1961, when it converted to the Lockheed C-130 Hercules by exchanging crews and aircraft with the 62d Troop Carrier Squadron, which temporarily took over the 345th's Providers.

In the spring of 1962, the squadron moved to the Pacific and Naha Air Base, Okinawa, where it was assigned to the 315th Air Division. Its first stay in the Pacific was brief, however, and on 8 January 1963 its mission, personnel and aircraft were transferred to the newly activated 35th Troop Carrier Squadron, while the 345th returned on paper to Dyess Air Force Base, Texas, where it was reunited with the 516th Troop Carrier Wing. While at Dyess the squadron participated in humanitarian airlift to New Orleans following a hurricane.

=== Vietnam war ===
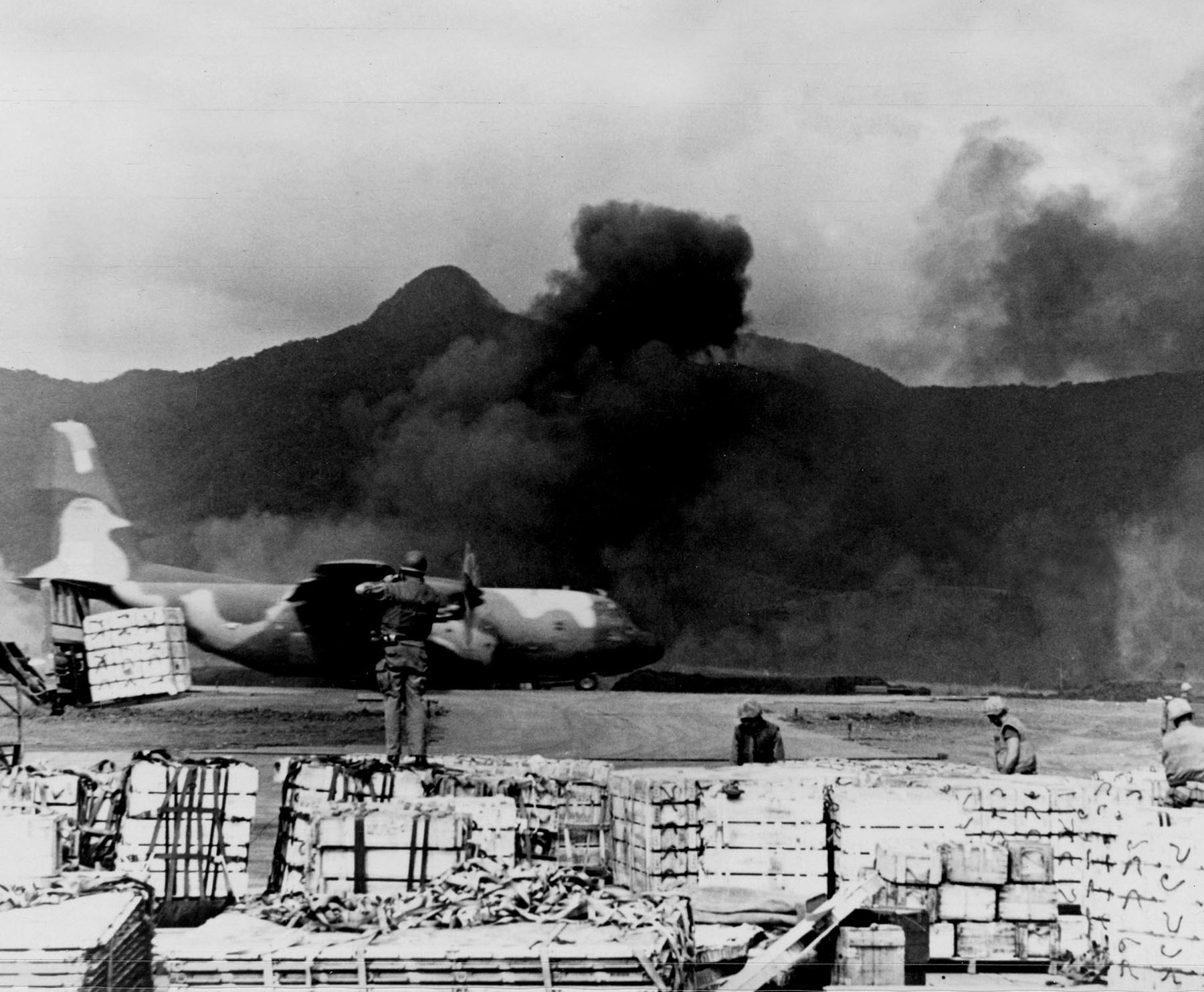
C-130 Hercules taking off from Khe Sanh 1968

As the United States Air Force (USAF) built up its forces in the Pacific as the Viet Nam War grew larger, however, the squadron returned to Naha in 1965. Four months later, it moved closer to the conflict at Ching Chuan Kang Air Base, Republic of China (usually called "CCK"). Although the squadron itself was not stationed in Viet Nam, it flew C-130s to augment task forces and other operational organizations during Vietnam War until 1973.

In 1968, a member of the squadron, Lt. Col. Howard Dallman, was awarded the Air Force Cross for his heroism at Khe Sanh. Col Dallman was deployed to Tuy Hoa Air Base along with C-130s from the squadron. On 5 February he was on a mission to transport a load of ammunition and a medical evacuation team to Khe Sanh. The weather was forecast to be at the minimum for an instrument approach, which made landing at the mountain-girded strip a challenge. The challenge was increased when the crew discovered that Khe Sanh's ground-controlled approach radar was out of commission. The crew's navigator. Maj. Gerald Johnson, was confident he could make a successful airborne radar approach, and the plane broke out of the overcast at three hundred feet above the airstrip. As the C-130 came to a stop, it was hit by a shell that ignited ammunition boxes in the cargo compartment. The crew immediately began fighting the fire while Dallman began backing up the plane to an area at the far end of the runway, where if the ammunition exploded it would not destroy the runway and support facilities nearby. The crew, with help from the Khe Sanh fire truck extinguished the fire and helped offload the ammo boxes.

As the last pallet of ammunition was unloaded, one of the plane's tires was blown by a sniper's bullet, and a mortar attack bracketed the C-130. The plane, which was drawing most of the fire, was towed for a short distance, then taxied to a maintenance area. There the damaged wheel was changed while the plane remained under fire from mortars, rockets, artillery, and heavy machine guns. While the wheel was being changed, Dallman agreed to fly an out-of-commission bulldozer back to Da Nang Air Base. As the aircraft positioned for takeoff, one engine, which had ingested debris from an exploding mortar round, quit. The 20,000-pound bulldozer had to be unloaded. Dallman left the plane to get permission to attempt a three-engine takeoff, but the crew managed to get the fourth engine started. The plane was hit again as it took off, but without serious damage. Dallman and his crew saved a valuable transport plane, delivered a load of ammunition to the surrounded Marines, and prevented major damage to a battered outpost. For dealing heroically with a series of crises that day, Dallman was awarded the Air Force Cross, the first tactical airlift crewman to be so honored.

In May 1971, the USAF withdrew its tactical units from Naha Air Base. As a result, the 374th Tactical Airlift Wing moved to CCK, assuming the place of the 314th wing (which returned to the US) and becoming the 345th squadron's headquarters. As C-123 and DeHavilland Canada C-7A Caribou aircraft were transferred to the Republic of Vietnam Air Force, the 374th wing became responsible for all C-130 airlift in South Vietnam. In late 1973, with the termination of USAF involvement in Viet Nam, all tactical units were withdrawn from CCK and the squadron returned to Okinawa at Kadena Air Base.

=== Pacific airlift ===
Following the end of hostilities in Southeast Asia, the squadron provided tactical, aeromedical, and operational support to Department of Defense agencies throughout the Pacific region from Kadena, and later from Yokota Air Base, until 1993. In December 1990, the squadron deployed to participate in Operation Desert Shield. It provided crews to the 1661st Tactical Airlift Squadron (Provisional) in Oman and the 1676th Tactical Airlift Squadron (Provisional) at King Fahd Airport, Saudi Arabia.

=== Active duty associate unit ===
The squadron was redesignated the 345th Airlift Squadron and activated in August 2010 at Keesler Air Force Base, Mississippi. At Keesler, it is an "active duty associate" unit. It is assigned no aircraft of its own, but its crews fly the C-130J aircraft of the 815th Airlift Squadron of Air Force Reserve Command. Although the squadron is assigned to the 19th Operations Group at Little Rock Air Force Base, it is under the operational control of the 403d Wing at Keesler.

The squadron performed its first deployment in January 2011 to Afghanistan. Together with members of the 815th and the 41st Airlift Squadron, they formed the 772d Expeditionary Airlift Squadron at Kandahar Airfield. Through airdrops of supplies to expeditionary forces in Afghanistan the deployed squadron members were able to avoid the need to dispatch convoys through dangerous areas to supply remote units. The squadron deployed again from 9 May to 16 September 2012.

Under the Force Structure Action Implementation Plan, the 345th and 815th squadrons were programmed to move to Pope Air Force Base, North Carolina on 1 October 2013. In August the Air Force announced that the move was being delayed until at least April 2014. The squadron was inactivated in June, although most active duty members were transferred to other units in April, resulting in the unit inactivation ceremony being held in late April.

== Lineage ==
- Constituted as the 345th Troop Carrier Squadron, Medium on 10 May 1949
- Activated in the reserve on 26 June 1949
- Ordered to active service on 16 April 1951
- Inactivated on 16 January 1953

Redesignated 345th Troop Carrier Squadron, Assault, Rotary Wing on 8 December 1954

- Activated on 8 March 1955
- Inactivated on 9 July 1956

Redesignated 345th Troop Carrier Squadron, Assault, Fixed Wing on 27 July 1956

- Activated on 8 October 1956

Redesignated as 345th Troop Carrier Squadron, Assault on 1 July 1958
Redesignated as 345th Troop Carrier Squadron, Medium on 18 December 1961
Redesignated as 345th Troop Carrier Squadron on 8 December 1965
Redesignated as 345th Tactical Airlift Squadron on 1 August 1967
Redesignated as 345th Airlift Squadron on 1 April 1992

- Inactivated on 1 July 1993

Redesignated as 345th Expeditionary Airlift Flight and converted to provisional status on 29 September 2004

- Withdrawn from provisional status on 9 September 2009

Redesignated as 345th Airlift Squadron on 7 July 2010

- Activated on 6 August 2010
- Inactivated in June 2014

=== Assignments ===
- 516th Troop Carrier Group, 26 June 1949 – 16 January 1953
- 516th Troop Carrier Group, 8 March 1955 – 9 July 1956
- Eighteenth Air Force, 8 October 1956 (attached to 513th Troop Carrier Group)
- Ninth Air Force, 1 September 1957 (attached to 513th Troop Carrier Group)
- 839th Air Division, 8 October 1957 (attached to 513th Troop Carrier Wing until 12 November 1958, 314th Troop Carrier Wing, until c. 15 May 1962)
- 315th Air Division, 1 June 1962
- 516th Troop Carrier Wing, 8 January 1963
- 315th Air Division, 27 November 1966 (attached to 6315th Operations Group)
- 314th Troop Carrier Wing (later 314th Tactical Airlift Wing), 25 March 1966;
- 374th Tactical Airlift Wing, 31 May 1971
- 316th Tactical Airlift Group, 1 October 1978
- 374th Tactical Airlift Wing, 1 October 1989
- 374th Operations Group, 1 April 1992 – 1 July 1993
- Air Mobility Command to activate or inactivate at any time on or after 29 September 2004
- 19th Operations Group, 6 August 2010 – June 2014

=== Stations ===
- Memphis Municipal Airport, Tennessee, 26 June 1949 – 16 January 1953
- Sewart Air Force Base, Tennessee, 8 March 1955 – 9 July 1956
- Sewart Air Force Base, Tennessee, 8 October 1956 – 15 May 1962
- Naha Air Base, Okinawa, Japan, 2 June 1962
- Dyess Air Force Base, Texas, 8 January 1963
- Naha Air Base, Okinawa, 27 November 1965
- Ching Chuan Kang Air Base, Taiwan, 20 March 1966
- Kadena Air Base, Okinawa, Japan, 1 December 1973
- Yokota Air Base, Japan, 1 September 1975 – 1 July 1993
- Keesler Air Force Base, Mississippi, 6 August 2010 – June 2014

=== Commanders ===
- Unknown 26 June 1949 – 17 April 1951
- Maj Fred H. Towne Jr., 17 April 1951
- Lt Col Benjamin F. Kelly, 8 Sep 1952–1953
- Maj James F. Fowler, 1955
- Maj Gregg D. Hartley, 19 May-9 Jun 1956
- Maj James F. Fowler, 1956
- Lt Col Perry H. Penn, 19 February 1957
- Lt Col Robert J. Marks, 21 January 1960
- Lt Col Joseph H. Griffith Jr., 20 Oct 1961-unknown
- Lt Col Richard D. Cote, unknown-8 Jan 1963
- Lt Col Raymond E. Carleton, 8 January 1963
- Lt Col William M. Cossaboom, 1 April 1964
- Lt Col Angelo N. Castanza, 31 January 1965
- Lt Col John H. Hazel, 30 June 1965
- Lt Col Leland A. Younkin, 5 November 1965
- Lt Col Robert J. Craig, 16 October 1966
- Lt Col John A. Zimmerman, 3 July 1967
- Lt Col Edward T. Davis, 1 May 1968
- Lt Col Loren A. Stoddard, 1 July 1968 – unknown
- Lt Col Thomas J. Leonard, by 30 Sep 1970-unknown
- Lt Col William F. Ellis, by 31 May 1971
- Lt Col Philip J. Riede, 4 February 1972
- Lt Col James S. Kinney, 31 January 1974
- Lt Col Harold W. Reed, 6 June 1975
- Col Charles A. Vickery, 21 January 1977
- Lt Col Roland L. Tharp, 1 March 1978
- Lt Col Sherman W. Bear, 28 June 1979
- Lt Col Frederick N. Buckingham, 17 November 1980
- Lt Col Daniel E. Sowada, 23 July 1982
- Lt Col Gregory G. Kirkland, 29 June 1984
- Lt Col John W. Brooks, 27 June 1986
- Lt Col Terry H. Messer, 6 July 1988
- Lt Col Edward J. McClure Jr., 12 January 1990
- Lt Col Edward J. Feeney Jr., 1 April 1992 – unknown
- Lt Col Craig L. Williams, 6 August 2010 – unknown

=== Aircraft ===
- Curtiss C-46 Commando, 1949–1952
- Fairchild C-119 Flying Boxcar, 1952–1953
- Sikorsky H-19, 1955
- Piasecki H-21 Workhorse ("Flying Banana"), 1955–1956
- Fairchild C-123 Provider, 1956–1961
- Lockheed C-130 Hercules, 1961–1963, 1963–1965, 1965–1993, 2010–2014

=== Awards and campaigns ===
Award streamer	Award	Dates	Notes
	Air Force Outstanding Unit Award w/Combat "V" Device	1 November 1967-31 December 1969	345th Tactical Airlift Squadron
	Air Force Outstanding Unit Award w/Combat "V" Device	12 February 1975-17 May 1975	345th Tactical Airlift Squadron
	Air Force Outstanding Unit Award	1 January 1964-9 December 1965	345th Troop Carrier Squadron
	Air Force Outstanding Unit Award	1 January 1982-31 December 1983	345th Tactical Airlift Squadron
	Air Force Outstanding Unit Award	1 January 1984-30 June 1985	345th Tactical Airlift Squadron
	Air Force Outstanding Unit Award	1 July 1987-30 June 1989	345th Tactical Airlift Squadron
	Philippine Republic Presidential Unit Citation	21 July 1972-15 August 1972	345th Tactical Airlift Squadron
	Vietnamese Gallantry Cross with Palm	1 November 1967-31 December 1969	345th Tactical Airlift Squadron

Campaign Streamer	Campaign	Dates	Notes
	Defense of Saudi Arabia	9 December 1990 – 16 January 1991	345th Tactical Airlift Squadron
	Liberation and Defense of Kuwait	17 January 1991 – 11 April 1991	345th Tactical Airlift Squadron
