= 348th Tactical Airlift Squadron =

348th Airlift Squadron

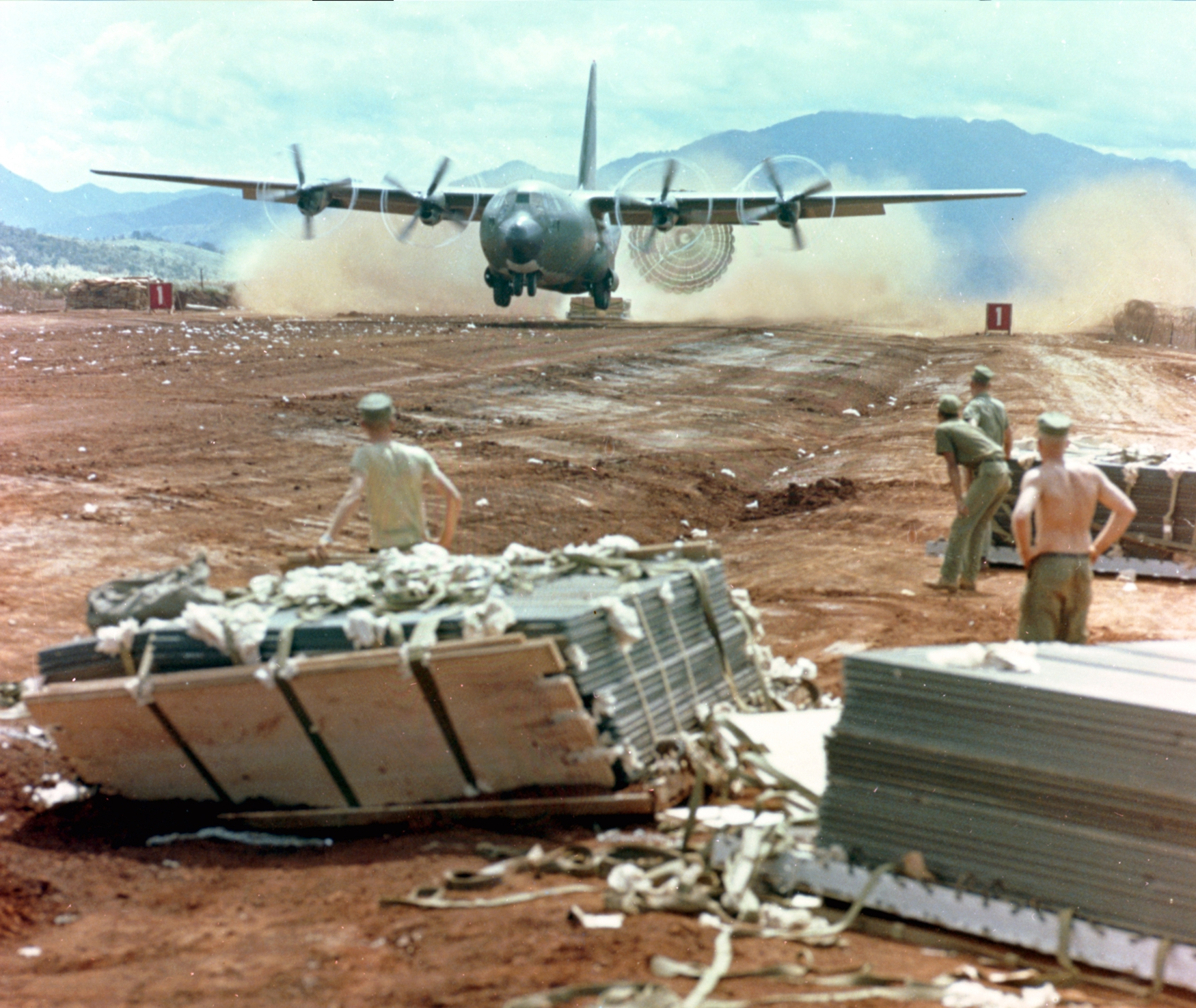
- C-130 Hercules delivering materiel in Viet Nam using the Low Altitude Parachute Extraction System
- Active: 1949–1951; 1968–1972
- Country: United States
- Branch: United States Air Force
- Role: Airlift
- Part of: Tactical Air Command
- Nickname: The Intrepids
- Engagements: Vietnam War
- Decorations: Vietnamese Gallantry Cross with Palm

Insignia
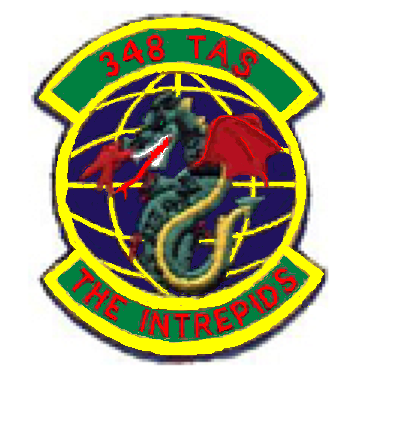
- Patch with 348th Tactical Airlift Squadron emblem

The 348th Tactical Airlift Squadron is an inactive United States Air Force squadron that was last assigned to the 516th Tactical Airlift Wing at Dyess Air Force Base, Texas where it was inactivated in June 1972.

The squadron was first activated as the 348th Troop Carrier Squadron in the Air Force Reserve in 1949 and trained at Memphis Municipal Airport, Tennessee. In 1951 it was called to active duty for the Korean War. Shortly after being called up its personnel were transferred to other units of the 516th Troop Carrier Group and it was inactivated.

The squadron was again activated as the 348th Tactical Airlift Squadron and activated at Dyess Air Force Base, flying the Lockheed C-130 Hercules. The squadron frequently deployed to Europe and the Pacific until it was inactivated in 1972.

== History ==
=== Reserve training and Korean War callup ===
The squadron was activated in the reserves in 1949 and assigned to the 516th Troop Carrier Group. The squadron trained under the supervision of the 2584th Air Force Reserve Training Center at Memphis Municipal Airport, Tennessee until April 1951. The 348th was called to active duty that month and its personnel used to round out other squadrons of the 516th and it was inactivated on 23 April 1951.

=== Airlift in the United States ===
The squadron was reactivated at Dyess Air Force Base, Texas in 1968 as a Lockheed C-130 Hercules unit. The squadron trained to airlift troops, equipment and supplies into combat zones, to resupply forces, and evacuate casualties. Until it was inactivated in 1972, the squadron frequently deployed to Europe and the Pacific.

== Lineage ==
- Constituted as the 348th Troop Carrier Squadron, Medium on 10 May 1949
- Activated in the reserve on 26 June 1949
- Ordered to active service on 16 April 1951
- Inactivated on 26 April 1951

Redesignated 348th Tactical Airlift Squadron on 1 July 1958 and activated (not organized)

- Organized on 5 July 1968
- Inactivated on 1 June 1972

=== Assignments ===
- 516th Troop Carrier Group, 26 June 1949 – 16 April 1951
- 516th Troop Carrier Wing, 5 July 1968 – 1 June 1972 (attached to unknown October 1968 – June 1969, 513th Tactical Airlift Wing, September 1969 – November 1969, February 1970 – March 1970, May 1970 – July 1970, January 1971 – March 1971, 322d Tactical Airlift Wing, October 1971 – December 1971, 513th Tactical Airlift Wing, May 1972 – June 1972)

=== Stations ===
- Memphis Municipal Airport, Tennessee, 26 June 1949 – 16 January 1953
- Dyess Air Force Base, Texas, 5 July 1968 – 1 June 1972

=== Aircraft ===
- Curtiss C-46 Commando, 1949–1951
- Lockheed C-130 Hercules, 1968–1972

=== Awards and campaigns ===
Award streamer	Award	Dates	Notes
	Vietnamese Gallantry Cross with Palm	18 October 1968-31 October 1968	348th Tactical Airlift Squadron

Campaign Streamer	Campaign	Dates	Notes
	Vietnam Air Offensive, Phase III	18 October 1968 – 31 October 1968	348th Tactical Airlift Squadron

== See also ==
- List of United States Air Force airlift squadrons
- List of Lockheed C-130 Hercules operators
