= 516th Aeronautical Systems Group =

516th Aeronautical Systems Group

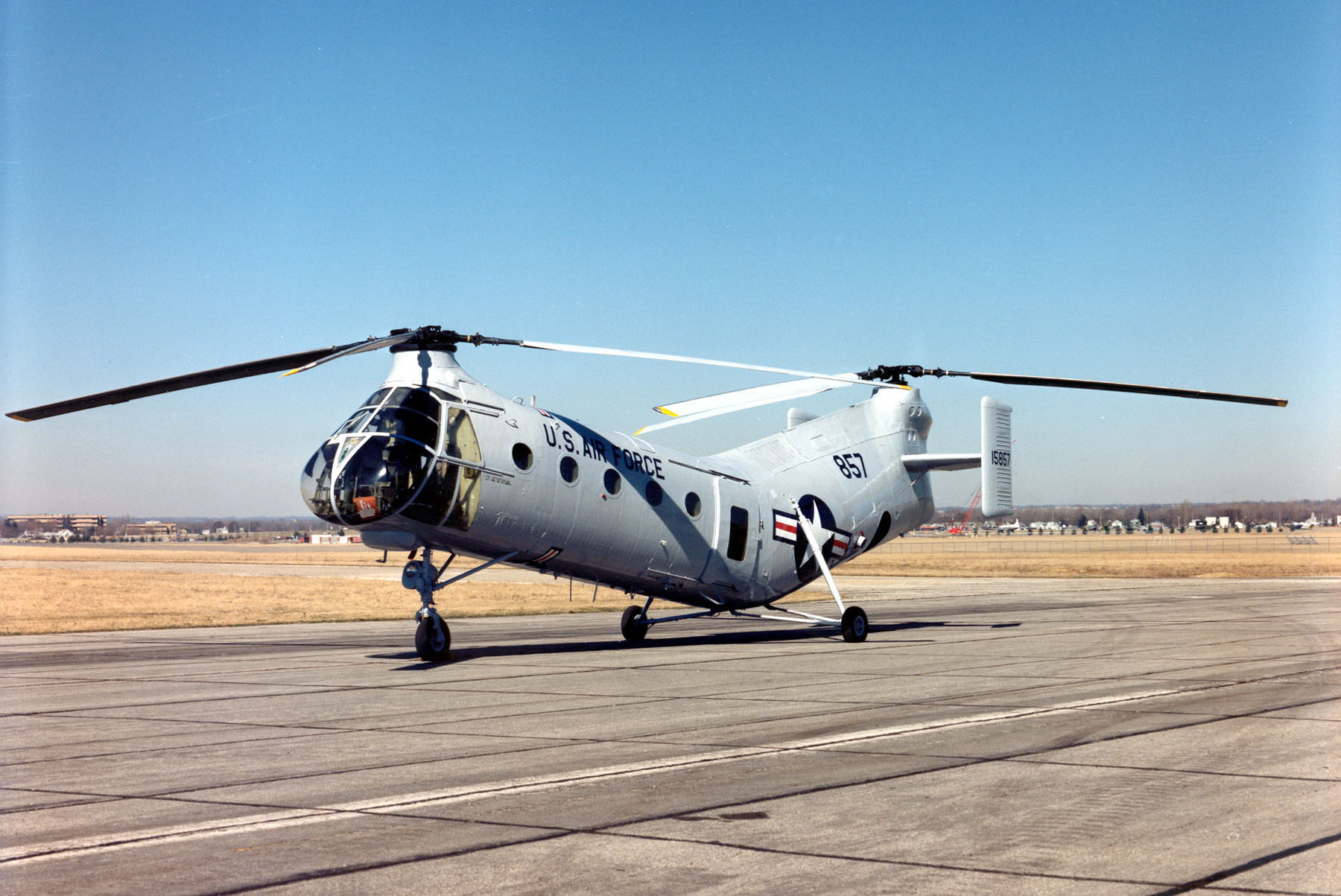
- Piasecki H-21 Workhorse
- Country: United States
- Branch: United States Air Force
- Role: Aeronautical Systems Development
- Part of: Air Force Materiel Command
- Engagements: European theater of World War II

Insignia
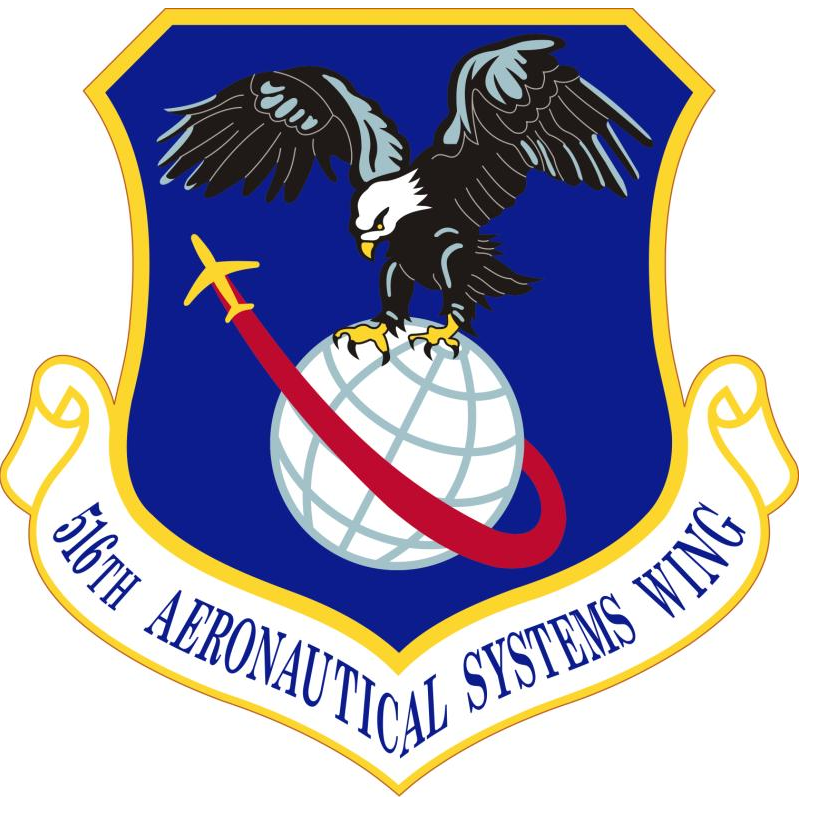
- 516th Aeronautical Systems Wing emblem

The 516th Aeronautical Systems Group is an inactive group of the United States Air Force (USAF). It was last assigned to the 516th Aeronautical Systems Wing of Air Force Materiel Command at Wright-Patterson Air Force Base, Ohio.

The unit was first activated in the fall of 1943 as the 31st Transport Group and transported high priority cargo and mail in the United Kingdom and delivered aircraft to combat airfields. Following the invasion of Normandy, the group moved to the continent and, although re-designated the 516th Troop Carrier Group, continued in this role until it was inactivated in Austria in the fall of 1946.

The group was activated in the Air Force Reserve in 1949 and trained at Memphis Municipal Airport, Tennessee. In 1951, it was called to active duty for the Korean War and served until 1953 when it was replaced by the 463d Troop Carrier Group.

In 1955, the unit was activated at Sewart Air Force Base, Tennessee as a rotary-wing troop carrier unit in a test of the USAF's ability to support United States Army assault operations. It participated in Operation Sage Brush, which was, in part, a test of this concept. The group was inactivated the following year and its aircraft distributed to helicopter support organizations.

Beginning in 2005, the C-17 Systems Group, later consolidated as the 516th Aeronautical Systems Group, was responsible for modernization, development, test, production, deployment and sustainment of new and existing aircraft systems to meet Air Mobility Command, Air Force Reserve Command, Air National Guard, and special operations forces requirements in global mobility mission areas.

== History ==
=== European operations ===
The group was formed in October 1943 as the 31st Transport Group in England when the support requirements for Eighth and Ninth Air Forces expanded beyond the capability of the 27th Air Transport Group. It was assigned a combination of transport squadrons for delivering high priority cargo and mail and ferrying squadrons to deliver aircraft from depots to combat bases. The group was initially activated at Camp Griffiss, which was the headquarters of Eighth Air Force and its VIII Air Force Service Command, but the group moved in a few days to RAF Grove, where one of the largest depots in the European Theater was located.

The group flew its first mission to the continent of Europe five days after D-Day, when Col. Feldman, the group commander, delivered a load of supplies to the Normandy Beachhead in a Douglas C-47 Skytrain and returned to England with Allied casualties. A detachment of the group was established near Omaha beach to organize the receipt of air freight and the return of wounded. In the first days of the Normandy campaign, the group's planes flew from a field within the range of enemy small arms fire. Traffic there temporarily exceeded that of many of the busiest transport bases in the United Kingdom, and it was claimed that it was the "busiest airdrome in the world."

In September 1944, the group moved forward to Querqueville Airfield, an advanced landing ground in France, and in the same month was combined with the 27th Air Transport Group into the 302d Transport Wing.

In September 1945, USSTAF organized the European Air Transport Service (Provisional), using the personnel of the 51st Troop Carrier Wing and the 31st was transferred to the control of the 51st wing. Shortly thereafter, it was redesignated as the 516th Troop Carrier Group. It continued to provide airlift support to the United States Air Forces Europe until inactivating in September 1946.

=== Reserve training and Korean War callup ===
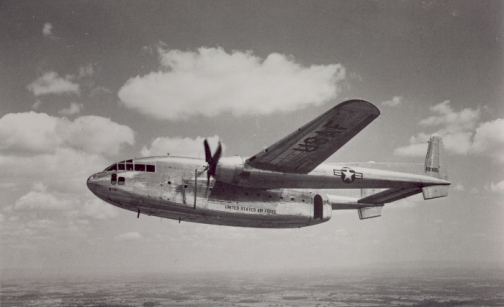
C-119 Flying Boxcar

The group was allotted to the reserves in 1949 and assigned to the 516th Troop Carrier Wing as Continental Air Command implemented the wing base reorganization. The group trained under the supervision of the 2584th Air Force Reserve Training Center at Memphis Municipal Airport, Tennessee until April 1951. The group was called to active duty that month and participated in tactical exercises and worldwide airlift. It converted from Curtiss C-46 Commando to Fairchild C-119 Flying Boxcar aircraft in 1952. The 516th was replaced by the 463d Troop Carrier Group in January 1953.

=== Helicopter assault operations ===
The group was reactivated in 1955 at Sewart Air Force Base, Tennessee as the 516th Troop Carrier Group, Assault, Rotary Wing in part to test the United States Air Force's ability to provide helicopter airlift to the Army. The group was initially equipped with Sikorsky H-19 helicopters, but soon replaced them with Piasecki H-21s. Its operations included participation in Operation Backlash II, which was a survey mission to fix the location of radar sites and support the construction of the Mid-Canada Line. The group also tested the evacuation of key high ranking personnel from Washington DC in the event of a nuclear attack.

The conflict between the Army and the Air Force concerning the use of Air Force helicopters to support Army assault operations was tested in Exercise Sage Brush. The 516th operated as part of the 20th Combat Airlift Division (Provisional) supporting Army Group Gulf, the aggressor force. The group's H-21s were dismantled and transported in Douglas C-124 Globemaster II aircraft in a test of air mobility. Following this test, the 516th group was inactivated in July 1956. The helicopters of the group's three squadrons were transferred to the 20th, 23d and 24th Helicopter Squadrons, whose mission was support for routine Air Force activities. Three months later, the group's squadrons were reactivated at Stewart as Fairchild C-123 Provider units, but the 516th was not activated with them, instead, they were attached to the 513th Troop Carrier Group.

=== Systems development ===
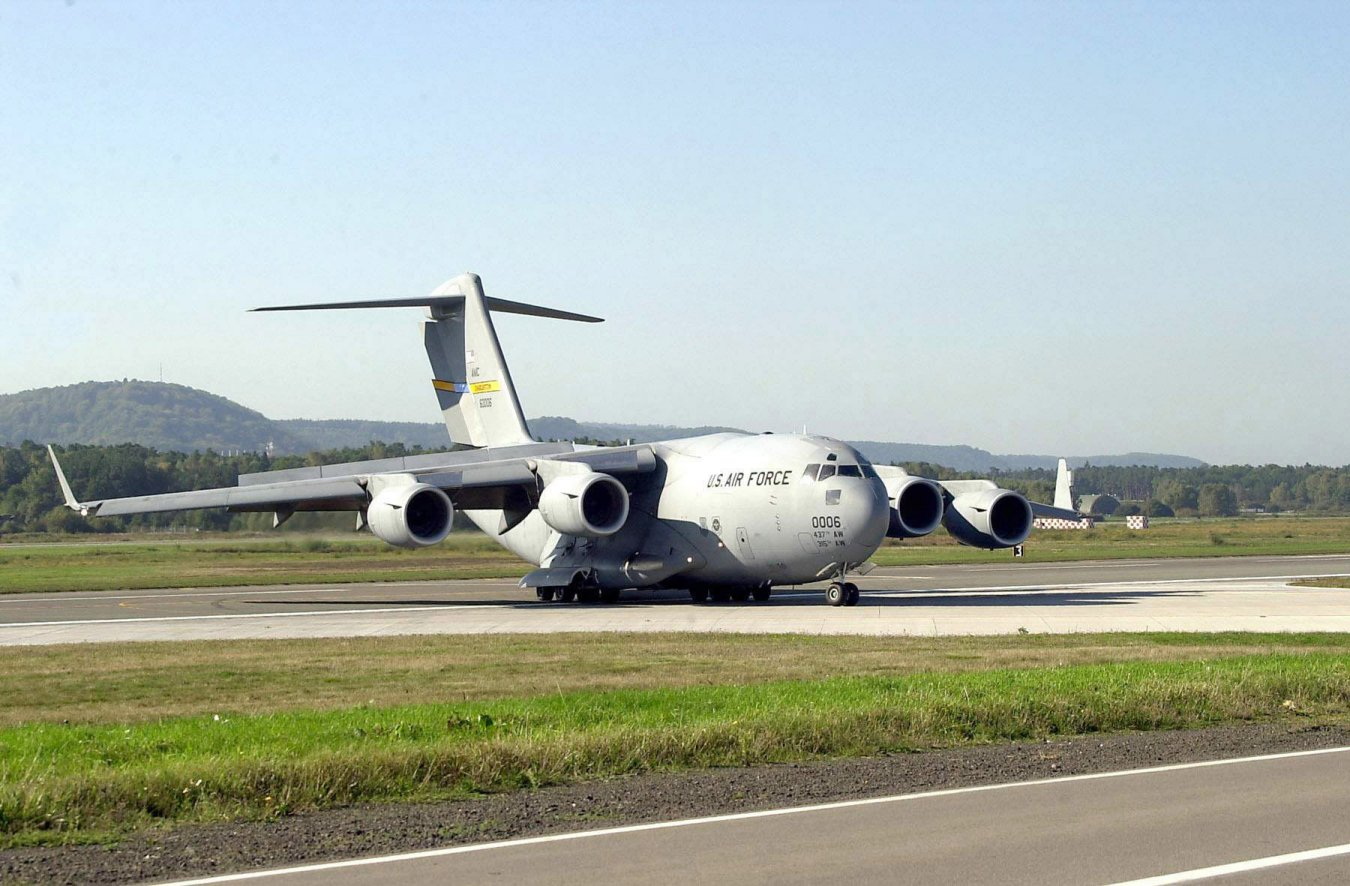
C-17 Globemaster III

In January 2005, Air Force Materiel Command (AFMC) implemented the Air Force Materiel Command Transformation in its Aeronautical Systems Center, replacing its traditional systems development offices with wings, groups, and squadrons. As a result, it activated the C-17 Systems Group at Wright-Patterson Air Force Base, Ohio to direct the modernization, development, test, production, deployment, and sustainment of C-17 aircraft, engine, support, and training systems. In the following year, the Air Force consolidated these new units with numbered units with histories. As a result, the new systems group was consolidated with the 516th and the unit was renamed the 516th Aeronautical Systems Group. In June 2010, the group was inactivated as AFMC returned to its previous organizational model in the Air Force Acquisition Improvement Plan.

== Lineage ==
516th Tactical Airlift Group

- Constituted as the 31st Transport Group on 25 October 1943

Activated on 28 October 1943
Redesignated 516th Troop Carrier Group on 15 September 1945
Inactivated on 30 September 1946
Redesignated 516th Troop Carrier Group, Medium on 10 May 1949
Activated in the Reserve on 26 June 1949
Ordered to active service on 16 April 1951
Inactivated on 16 January 1953

- Redesignated 516th Troop Carrier Group, Assault, Rotary Wing

Activated on 8 March 1955
Inactivated on 9 July 1956
Redesignated 516th Tactical Airlift Group on 31 July 1985 (remained inactive)

- Consolidated with C-17 Systems Group as C-17 Systems Group on 23 June 2006

516th Aeronautical Systems Group

- Constituted as C-17 Systems Group on 23 November 2004

Activated on 18 January 2005
Consolidated with 516th Tactical Airlift Group on 23 June 2006
Redesignated 516th Aeronautical Systems Group on 14 July 2006
Inactivated on 30 June 2010

=== Assignments ===
- IX Air Service Command (later IX Air Force Service Command), 28 October 1943
- 302d Transport Wing, c. 1 September 1944
- 51st Troop Carrier Wing, c. 4 September 1945 – 30 September 1946 (attached to European Air Transport Service (Provisional))
- 516th Troop Carrier Wing, 26 June 1949 -16 January 1953

Eighteenth Air Force, 8 March 1955 – 9 July 1956

- Mobility Systems Wing (later 516th Aeronautical Systems Wing), 18 January 2005 – 30 June 2010

=== Stations ===
- Camp Griffiss (Station 586), England, 28 October 1943
- RAF Grove (Station 519), England, 1 November 1943
- Querqueville Airfield (A-23), France, 5 September 1944
- Chartres Airfield (A-41), France, 12 November 1944
- RAF Grove, England (Station 519), 7 December 1944
- RAF Bovingdon (Station 112), England, c. 15 October 1945
- Bremen Air Base (R-40), Germany, 10 April 1946
- Tulln Army Air Base, Austria, 10 July 1946 – 30 September 1946
- Memphis Municipal Airport, Tennessee, 26 June 1949 – 16 January 1953
- Sewart Air Force Base, Tennessee, 8 March 1955 – 9 July 1956
- Wright-Patterson Air Force Base, Ohio, 18 January 2005 – 30 June 2010

=== Components ===
- 87th Transport Squadron (Cargo & Mail): 16 December 1944 – August 1945
- 310th Ferrying Squadron, 17 November 1944 – c. 25 April 1945
- 312th Station Complement Squadron. 8 November 1944 – c. 9 April 1945
- 313th Transport Squadron (Cargo & Mail): c. 28 October 1943 – c. 15 October 1945
- 314th Transport Squadron (Cargo & Mail): c. 28 October 1943 – c. 15 October 1945
- 315th Transport Squadron (Cargo & Mail): c. 28 October 1943 – c. 15 October 1945
- 316th Transport Squadron (Cargo & Mail): c. 28 October 1943 – c. 9 April 1944
- 317th Transport Squadron (Cargo & Mail): 28 October 1943 – 9 April 1944
- 318th Transport Squadron (Cargo & Mail): c. 28 October 1943 – c. 9 April 1944
- 319th Transport Squadron (Cargo & Mail): 28 October 1943 – 9 April 1944
- 321st Troop Carrier Squadron: 15 October 1945 – 16 October 1945
- 333d Transport Squadron (Cargo & Mail): c. 28 October 1943 – 9 April 1944
- 323d Troop Carrier Squadron: 15 October 1945 – 16 October 1945
- 325th Ferrying Squadron (later 324th Troop Carrier Squadron): 9 December 1943 – 31 October 1945
- 326th Ferrying Squadron (later 325th Troop Carrier Squadron): 9 December 1943 – 31 October 1945
- 345th Troop Carrier Squadron: 26 June 1949 – 16 January 1953, 8 March 1955 – 9 July 1956
- 346th Troop Carrier Squadron: 26 June 1949 – 16 January 1953, 8 March 1955 – 9 July 1956
- 347th Troop Carrier Squadron: 26 June 1949 – 16 January 1953, 8 March 1955 – 9 July 1956
- 348th Troop Carrier Squadron: 26 June 1949 – 23 April 1951

=== Aircraft ===
- Douglas C-47 Skytrain, 1943–1946
- Beechcraft T-7 Navigator, 1949–1951
- Beechcraft T-11 Kansan, 1949–1951
- Curtiss C-46 Commando, 1949–1953
- Fairchild C-119 Flying Boxcar, 1952–1953
- Sikorsky H-19, 1955
- Piasecki H-21 Workhorse ("Flying Banana"), 1955–1956

=== Campaigns ===
Campaign Streamer	Campaign	Dates	Notes
	Normandy	6 June 1944 – 24 July 1944	31st Transport Group
	Northern France	25 July 1944 – 14 September 1944	31st Transport Group
	Ardennes-Alsace	16 December 1944 – 25 January 1945	31st Transport Group
	World War II Army of Occupation	9 May 1945 – 30 September 1946	31st Transport Group (later 516th Troop Carrier Group)
