= European Air Materiel Command =

Support organization of the U.S. Army Air Forces in Europe

European Air Materiel Command

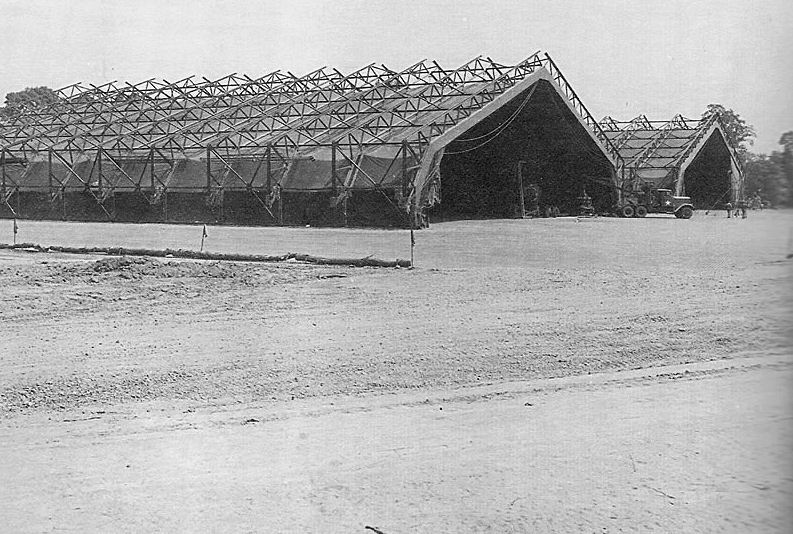
- Temporary hangars at an advanced air depot in France
- Active: 1942–1947
- Disbanded: 8 October 1948
- Country: United States
- Branch: United States Army Air Forces
- Role: Logistics support
- Size: 62,000 at peak
- Part of: United States Air Forces Europe
- Engagements: European Theater of Operations

Aircraft flown
- Transport: Douglas C-47 Skytrain

The European Air Materiel Command was a support organization of the United States Army Air Forces.

== History ==
After November 1942, the Ninth Air Force was established in Egypt to replace the U.S. Army Middle East Air Force. Major General Lewis H. Brereton assumed command, and established the IX Air Service Command, which joined the IX Bomber Command and the IX Fighter Command as the major subordinate headquarters. IX Air Service Command was changed to IX Air Force Service Command (IX AFSC) by an unnumbered Ninth Air Force Memorandum of 29 January 1944.

IX Air Force Service Command was more clearly patterned after its Eighth Air Force opposite number than any of the other Ninth Air Force commands. A number of officers and enlisted men had been brought to England from Egypt, but most of the key members of the headquarters came from the Eighth Air Force. General Miller, for most of the past year the commander of the VIII AFSC, took over the IX AFSC in October 1943 and brought with him members of his former staff. From the Tactical Air Depot Area came additional officers and men to round out a headquarters staff rich in experience. On 5 May, Brig. Gen. Myron R. Wood succeeded General Miller as commander of the IX AFSC. In mid-November, the service command headquarters moved into newly constructed quarters across from the Ascot race course, adjacent to the Ninth Air Force headquarters at Sunninghill Park.

The projected size of the Ninth Air Force and the scope of its operations clearly required a large and mobile service command. The service command, in turn, recognized early that its own size and wide-flung operations made decentralization of its organization desirable. Accordingly, borrowing from the experience of VIII AFSC, in October it set up a base air depot area (BADA) and an advanced air depot area (AADA) which were areas in terms of function rather than geography. The base air depot area was intended primarily for supply and aircraft assembly functions. For a time, BADA was located at Constitution Hill in the center of Sudbury, Suffolk. In November 1943 the IX Base Aircraft Assembly Depot at RAF Filton, under the command of the BADA, was established. Its three Mobile Repair and Reclaimation Squadrons initially were assembling aircraft (including Thunderbolts, Mustangs, and Lightnings) which were arriving at Avonmouth.

In December the command divided the advanced air depot area into a 1st and 2d AADA. This further decentralization of the command was purportedly in preparation for the move to the continent, where mobile warfare would require decentralized operations. In addition, the two headquarters could be, and were, of value in organizing and training the many service units formed in the United Kingdom by the IX AFSC.

Beginning in August 1943, RAF Grove was used by the 3rd Tactical Air Depot of IX Air Service Command, repairing A-20 Havocs and P-61 Black Widows. Starting on 31 October, the 31st Transport Group, IX Air Service Command used the airfield with C-47 Skytrains with the mission of transporting cargo and personnel between IX Air Force airfields in the UK. The 31st TG consisted of the 87th, 313th and 314th Transport Squadrons.

In 1945 IX Air Force Service Command was reassigned from Ninth Air Force to USSTAF (about the date IX ASC moved to Erlangen). On 7 October 1946, IX AFSC was redesignated European Air Materiel Command. This command administered United States Air Forces in Europe's supply and maintenance depots. EAMC was headquartered at Erlangen Air Depot. At Erding Air Depot, it had Detachment B, 4th Air Vehicle Repair Squadron, and the 43d Air Depot. The 10th Air Depot was located at Oberpfaffenhofen Air Depot. The 862d Engineer Aviation Battalion and 837th Engineer Aviation Battalion were located at Landsberg. At Industriehafen Air Depot was Detachment A, 42d Air Repair Squadron. Minor EAMC facilities were located at Bad Wiesse, Wolfgang, Munich, Bruck, Oberwiesenfeld and Bremerhaven. EAMC also controlled ammunition depots at Landesberg, Roth and Zepplenheim. EAMC remained assigned to USAFE until it was inactivated on 15 September 1947.

== Lineage ==
- Constituted as the 9th Air Force Service Command on 27 July 1942

Redesignated IX Air Force Service Command on 18 September 1942
Redesignated IX Air Service Command in 1943
Redesignated IX Air Force Service Command on 24 January 1944
Redesignated European Air Materiel Command on 7 October 1946
Inactivated on 15 September 1947

- Disbanded on 8 October 1948

=== Assignments ===
- 3d Air Force (later Third Air Force), 27 Jul 42
- Air Service Command, September 42
- Ninth Air Force, November 1942
- Twelfth Air Force, August 1943
- Ninth Air Force, September 1943
- United States Strategic Air Forces (later United States Air Forces Europe), c. 2 December 1945

=== Components ===
Commands

- Tactical Air Depot Area (later I Tactical Air Depot Area), c. October 1943 – unknown
- 1st Advanced Air Depot Area Command, c. 16 December 1943 – 1945
- 2d Advanced Air Depot Area Command, c. 16 December 1943 – 1945
- VIII Tactical Air Service Area Command (later Ninth Air Force Advanced Depot Area Command), 16 October 1943 – c. 28 January 1944

Division

- Air Disarmament Division, 10 January 1945 – 1 March 1946

Depot Areas

- Continental Air Depot Area (Provisional) [later Central Air Depot Area (Provisional)], 10 December 1944 – c. 30 April 1945
- IX Air Force Base Air Depot Area, 12 November 1943 – c. 5 June 1945

Depots

- Erding Air Depot, 5 November 1946 – 15 September 1947
- European Air Depot, September 1945 – 5 November 1946
- Montdidier Air Ammunition Depot, 15 June 1946 – 20 September 1946
- 2d Depot Unit, Army, c. April 1945 – 15 September 1947
- Ninth Air Force Base Depot, 5 June 1945 – September 1945
- 10th Air Depot Group (later 10th Air Depot), 30 December 1945 – 15 September 1947
- 42d Air Depot Group (later 42d Air Depot), 31 December 1945 – 5 June 1947
- 44th Air Depot, c. 1 June 1946 – 15 December 1946
- 45th Air Depot, c. 1 January 1946 – c. 31 August 1947

Regiments

- 1585th Quartermaster Truck Regiment
- 1586th Quartermaster Truck Regiment

Wings

- 302d Transport Wing, 5 December 1943 – 1 September 1944

Groups

- 31st Transport Group, 28 October 1943 – c. 1 September 1944
- 32nd Service Group, 4 February 1944 – 11 June 1945
- 323d Bombardment Group, Medium, 15 Jun – 25 Nov 1945
- 503d Air Service Group, 25 October 1945 - 15 December 1945

=== Stations ===
- MacDill Field, Florida, 27 July 1942
- Patterson Field, Ohio, 1 September 1942
- Tinker Field, Oklahoma, 9 October 1942
- Camp Kilmer, New Jersey, 29 October 1942 – 1 November 1943
- Camp Russell B. Huckstep, Heliopolis, Egypt, November 1942
- Cairo, Egypt, 12 November 1942
- Welford Park (Station 474), England, 10 October 1943
- RAF Bushy Park (Station 586), England, 16 October 1943
- RAF Grove, England (Station 519), c. October 1943
- Sunninghill Park (Station 472), 7 November 1943
- Creil (A-81), France, 20 September 1944
- Luxembourg, Luxembourg, c. 30 April 1945
- Erlangen Air Base, 15 August 1945 – 15 September 1947

=== Campaigns ===
Campaign Streamer	Campaign	Dates	Notes
	Egypt-Libya	12 November 1942 – 12 February 1943	IX Air Force Service Command
	Tunisia	12 November 1942 – 13 May 1943	IX Air Force Service Command
	Sicily	14 May 1943 – 17 August 1943	IX Air Service Command
	Normandy	6 June 1944 – 24 July 1944	IX Air Force Service Command
	Ground Combat, EAME Theater	12 November 1942 – 11 May 1945	IX Air Force Service Command
