= Mule train =

Mule train may refer to:

- Mule train (transport), a connected or unconnected line of mules, pulling or carrying cargo or riders
- "Mule Train", 1949 popular song written by Johnny Lange, Hy Heath, Doc Tommy Scott and Fred Glickman
- Mule Train (film), a 1950 Western film starring Gene Autry and Sheila Ryan
- Project Mule Train or Operation Mule Train, a United States Air Force operation in South Vietnam, from December 11, 1961 to December 8, 1962
- The Mule Train, a protest caravan as part of Martin Luther King and Ralph Abernathy's Poor People's Campaign
- Mules (train), Amtrak trains formerly operating between St. Louis and Kansas City, Missouri
