= 302nd Air Division =

Inactive United States Air Force unit

302d Air Division
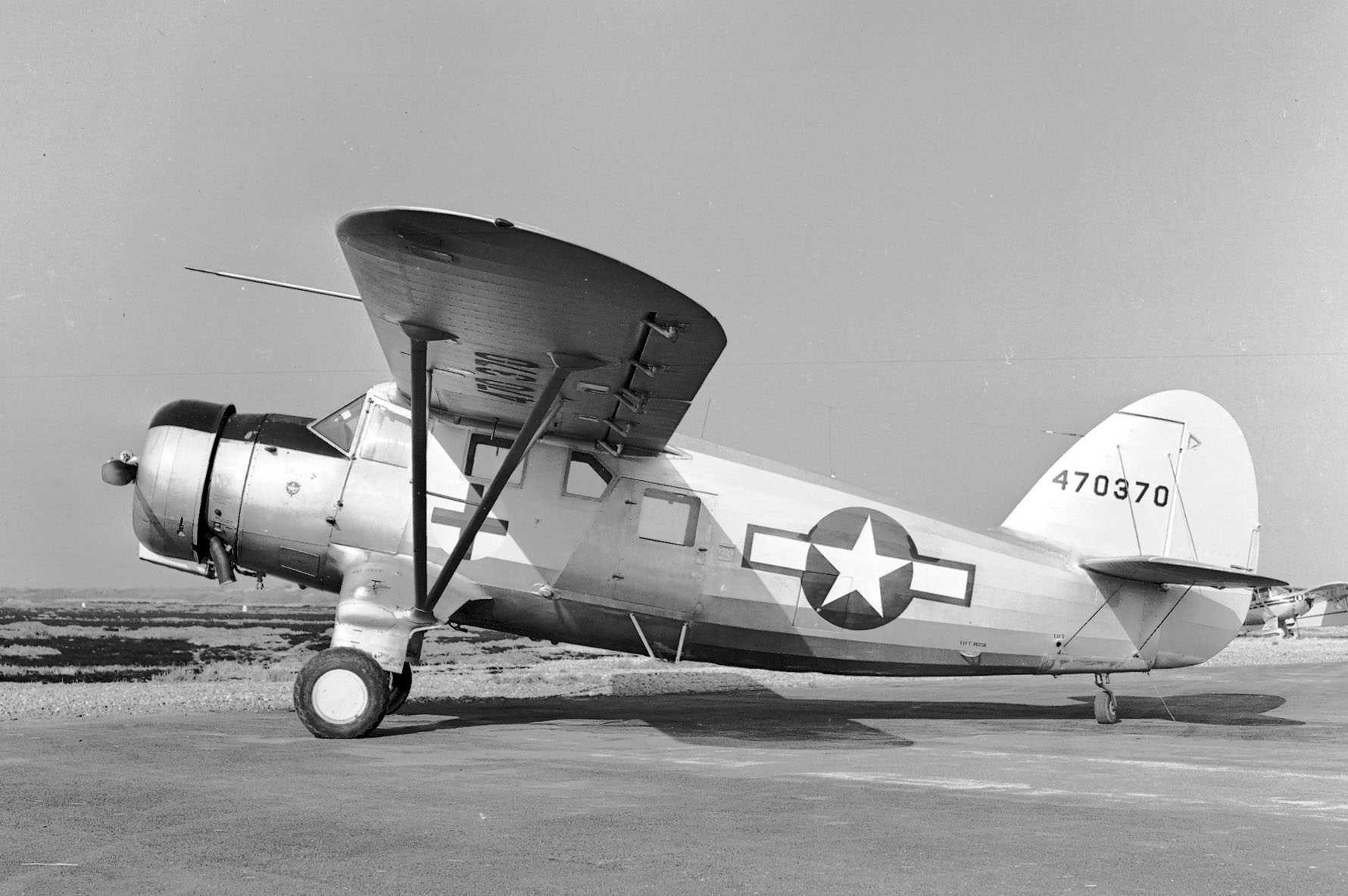
- C-64 Norseman in medical evacuation markings
- Active: 1943–1945; 1946–1949
- Country: United States
- Branch: United States Air Force
- Role: Command of airlift units
- Engagements: European Theater of Operations

The 302d Air Division is an inactive United States Air Force Division. Its last assignment was with Fourteenth Air Force at Marietta Air Force Base, Georgia, where it was inactivated on 27 June 1949. ' During World War II, as the 302d Transport Wing the unit provided logistical airlift support for United States Strategic Air Forces. It was reactivated as a reserve headquarters in 1946, and was inactivated in 1949 when reserve units converted to the wing base organization and budget restrictions reduced the size of the Air Force.

== History ==
=== World War II ===
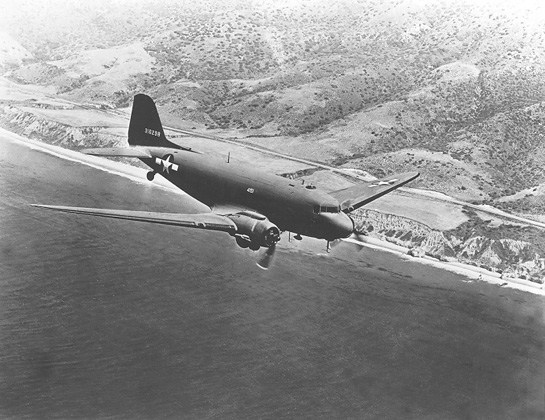
C-47 as flown by wing units

The division was first activated as the 302d Transport Wing in December 1943, but remained a paper unit until 6 July 1944 when organization of the wing headquarters began. It was not until September that the wing's flying groups were assigned, although the wing assumed operational control of the 31st Transport Group upon organization of wing headquarters. The 27th Air Transport Group was transferred from Eighth Air Force and the 31st Transport Group joined the wing from Ninth Air Force. Shortly after these groups were assigned, the wing and the groups moved from England to France,

The subordinate groups of the 302d carried cargo and passengers, first within Great Britain and later, to and from continental Europe. The cargo transported included medical supplies and whole blood, and materiel such as gasoline, helmets, bayonets, belly tanks, ammunition, clothing, Signal Corps equipment, and even telephone poles. "Passengers included war correspondents, entertainers, general officers, enlisted personnel, pilots, German prisoners, former Allied prisoners of war, and both Allied and enemy wounded personnel." The wing also operated a courier service between Great Britain and the continent, although its 27th group moved all its operations to the continent.

During the rapid advance of Third Army, the ruined highway and rail system of France prevented the shipment of fuel to maintain its advance. A "Petrol for Patton" system was organized to airlift gasoline to his advanced elements, using not only transports of the wing and IX Troop Carrier Command, but Boeing B-17 Flying Fortresses and Consolidated B-24 Liberators of Eighth Air Force and aircraft and crews temporarily transferred from Air Transport Command. The wing was augmented by over 400 personnel to manage this effort.

Although most of the wing squadrons flew the Douglas C-47 Skytrain, the 320th Transport Squadron of its 27th group was equipped with Noorduyn UC-64 Norseman aircraft for medical evacuation missions. In February 1945, the wing began to ferry aircraft as well. Ferrying aircraft had been part of the mission of the wing's groups prior to their assignment to the wing, but when the wing assumed command of the two groups, Base Air Depot Area took over management of aircraft ferrying, although using crews from the 302d. Aircraft ferried included Boeing B-17 Flying Fortressess, Consolidated B-24 Liberators, Martin B-26 Marauders, Douglas A-20 Havocs, North American P-51 Mustangs, Consolidated C-109 Liberator Expresses, and numerous other models within the European theater of operations. In total, over 85 types of aircraft were flown by the wing's 310th Ferrying Squadron.

During the Central Europe Campaign, the wing established a detachment of its 311th Ferrying Squadron, which had been transferred from the 27th group to the direct control of the wing, at Toussus-le-Noble Airport to maintain a communications flight for the Air Staff of Supreme Headquarters Allied Expeditionary Forces, located at Reims.

=== Reserve operations ===
The wing was activated in the reserves under Air Defense Command (ADC) at Marietta Army Air Field in December 1946 and was shortly redesignated the 302d Troop Carrier Wing. In 1947 it was assigned two troop carrier groups, located at Marietta and at Morrison Field, Florida. Continental Air Command assumed responsibility for managing reserve and Air National Guard units from ADC in July 1948. At the same time, the adoption of the wing base organization system by the regular Air Force called for wings to be single base organizations, and the unit became the 302d Air Division.

The 302d participated in routine reserve training with its assigned trainer aircraft and supervised the training of its assigned groups until it was inactivated in June 1949 when President Truman's reduced 1949 defense budget also required reductions in the number of units in the Air Force. Most of the division's equipment and personnel were used to form the 94th Bombardment Wing, which was simultaneously activated at Marietta.

== Lineage ==
- Established as 302 Transport Wing (Special) on 2 November 1943

Activated on 5 December 1943
Inactivated on 15 December 1945

- Activated in the Reserve on 20 December 1946

Redesignated 302 Troop Carrier Wing on 31 December 1946
Redesignated 302 Air Division, Troop Carrier on 16 April 1948
Inactivated on 27 June 1949
Redesignated 302 Air Division on 1 September 1959

=== Assignments ===
- IX Air Service Command (later, IX Air Force Service Command), 5 December 1943
- Air Service Command, United States Strategic Air Forces in Europe, 1 September 1944
- Continental Air Depot Area, United States Strategic Air Forces in Europe (later, Continental Air Depot Area, Air Technical Service Command), 9 December 1944
- Ninth Air Force, 1 June 1945
- United States Air Forces in Europe, 18 July 1945
- Army Service Forces, c. 8 December 1945 – 15 December 1945
- Fourteenth Air Force, 20 December 1946
- Ninth Air Force, 22 December 1948
- Fourteenth Air Force, 1 February – 27 June 1949

=== Stations ===
- Sunninghill Park, England (Station 472), 5 December 1943
- RAF Grove England (Station 519), unknown-c. 8 September 1944
- RAF Cranford (Station 525), England, c. 8 September 1944
- Paris, France, (Station 386), 15 November 1944 (Note: Wing headquarters was at 1 Rue de Tillsit at Champs Elysees.)
- RAF Grove, England (Station 519), c. 1 October – 9 December 1945
- Marietta Army Air Field (later Marietta Air Force Base), Georgia, 20 December 1946 – 27 June 1949

=== Components ===
Groups

- 1st Service Group (Provisional) (later 1001st Service Group (Provisional)): c. 1 September 1944 – c. 12 April 1945
- 27th Air Transport Group: 1 September 1944 – 5 April 1945; 18 July – 15 October 1945
- 31st Transport Group: 1 September 1944 – c. 4 September 1945
- 370th Air Service Group: 12 April 1945 – 15 December 1945 (attached to 27th Air Transport Group)
- 371st Air Service Group: 12 April 1945 – 15 December 1945 (attached to 31st Transport Group)
- 435th Troop Carrier Group: 15 July 1947 – 26 June 1949
- 514th Troop Carrier Group: 17 October 1947 – 26 June 1949

Squadrons

- 10th Airdrome Squadron: 1 September 1944 – 5 April 1945
- 310th Ferrying Squadron: c. 1 May 1945 – c. 25 August 1945
- 311th Ferrying Squadron: c. 18 July 1945 – c. 15 September 1945
- 312th Station Complement Squadron: c. 6 July 1944 – c. 1 September 1944
- 320th Transport Squadron: 18 July 1945 – 8 August 1945
- 1302d Ferrying Squadron (Provisional), c. February 1945 – c. 1 May 1945

=== Aircraft ===
- Douglas C-47 Skytrain, 1944–1945
- Curtiss C-46 Commando, 1945
- Noorduyn UC-64 Norseman, 1945

=== Commanders ===
- Col Leslie P. Arnold, c. 5 December 1943
- Col Charles W. Steinmetz, 6 July 1944
- Col Leslie P. Arnold, 1 September 1944
- Col Martin A. Bateman, 3 December 1944 – unknown
- Col H. C. Allen, by 6 August 1945 – unknown
- Unknown, 20 Dec 1946
- Col William L. Plummer, 17 January 1947 – unknown

=== Campaigns ===
| Campaign Streamer | Campaign | Dates | Notes |
|---|---|---|---|
| | European Theater without inscription | 5 December 1943 – 21 May 1945 | 302d Transport Wing |

== See also ==
- List of United States Air Force air divisions
- List of C-47 Skytrain operators
