= 322d Tactical Airlift Wing =

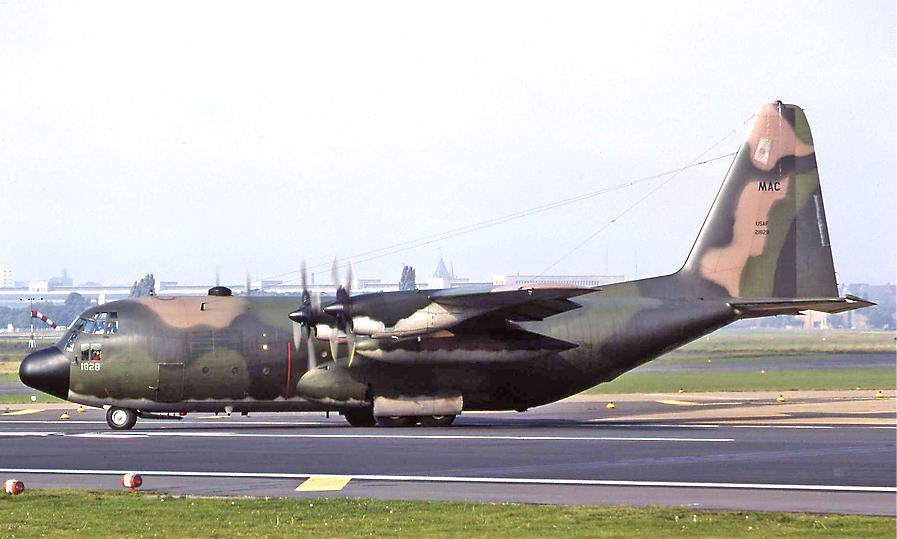
- C-130 at Rhein Main Air Base
- Active: 1970–1975
- Country: United States
- Branch: United States Air Force
- Role: Airlift

Insignia
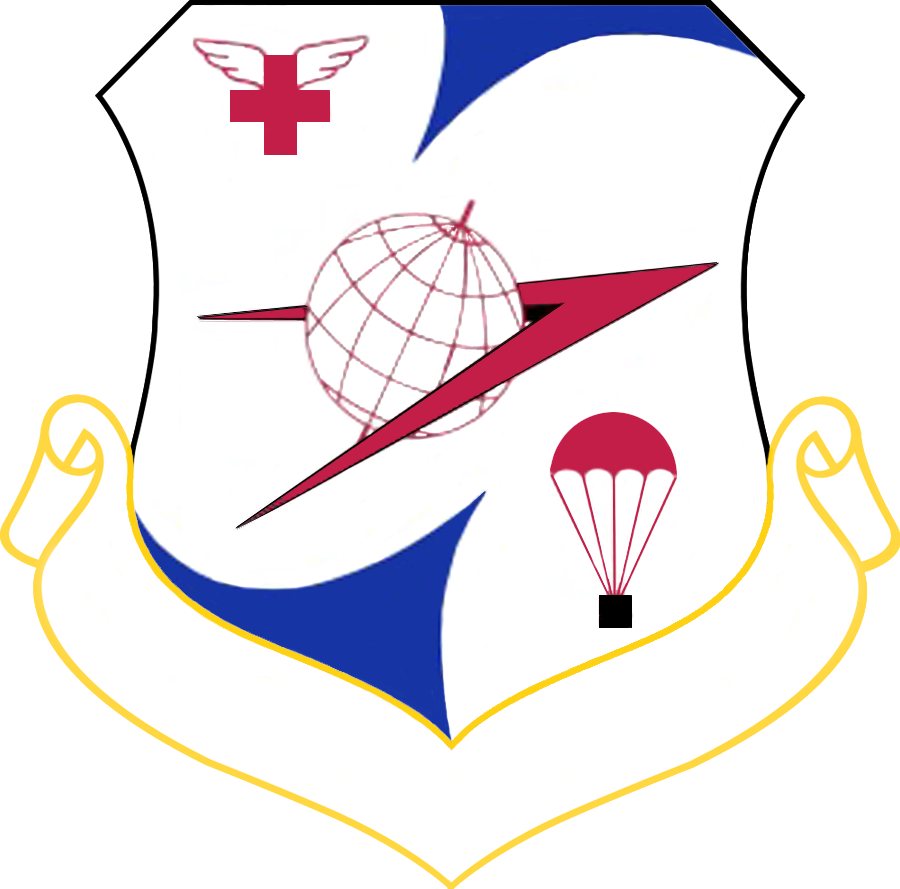
- Emblem used by the 322d Tactical Airlift Wing (Note: This emblem was approved for the 322d Air Division. It was not authorized for the 322d Tactical Airlift Wing, but was used by the wing throughout its existence.)

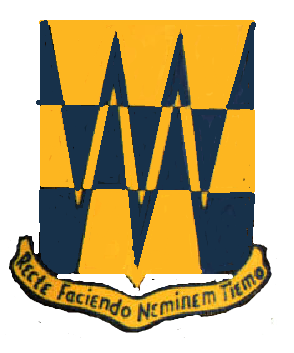
- Emblem authorized for the 322d Tactical Airlift Wing (Note: This emblem was authorized for the 322d Bombardment Group. The group's historical materials, including its emblem were temporarily bestowed on the 322d Tactical Airlift Wing while the wing was active.)

The 322d Tactical Airlift Wing is an inactive unit of the United States Air Force.

== History ==
The unit was activated as the 322d Tactical Airlift Wing on 1 January 1970 at Rhein-Main Air Base, West Germany, replacing the 7310th Tactical Airlift Wing.

The 322d Wing used rotational Lockheed C-130 Hercules squadrons for tactical airlift in Europe, North Africa, and the Middle East. In addition, the wing used Douglas C-118 Liftmasters and Convair C-131 Samaritans for aeromedical airlift until late 1972, then shifted to Douglas C-9A Nightingales for this work, continuing aeromedical airlift operations through March 1975.

The wing utilized Boeing KC-135 Stratotankers (VIP-equipped) to provide transportation for the Chief of Staff of the United States Air Force (CINCUSAF) until early 1973, followed by KC-135B until early 1974 and by Boeing C-135 Stratolifter thereafter. It used VT-29 aircraft to support Air Force North, a North Atlantic Treaty Organization component.

In March 1973, the wing gained the 7th Special Operations Squadron, equipped with Douglas C-47 Skytrain, Bell UH-1H Huey, and C-130E aircraft, which was reassigned from the 26th Tactical Reconnaissance Wing at Ramstein Air Base when the 26th moved to Zweibrücken Air Base. All but the C-130s were transferred a few months later to conduct unconventional warfare operations in Europe.

The wing was inactivated in June 1975 when it was replaced by the 435th Tactical Airlift Wing.

== Lineage ==
- Constituted as the 322d Tactical Airlift Wing on 21 November 1969
- Activated on 1 January 1970

Inactivated on 30 June 1975

=== Assignments ===
- Seventeenth Air Force, 1 January 1970 – 30 June 1975

=== Components ===
Assigned

- 7th Special Operations Squadron: 15 March 1973 – 30 June 1976
- 55th Aeromedical Airlift Squadron: 1 January 1970 – 31 March 1975
- 7406th Support Squadron (later 7406th Operations Squadron: 15 November 1971 – 30 June 1974
- 7411 Support Flight (later 7411th Operations Flight: 1 February 1972 – 1 February 1975

Attached C-130 rotation squadrons

- 32d Tactical Airlift Squadron, 15 February – 15 April 1975
- 36th Tactical Airlift Squadron, 1 January – 2 February 1970; 10 August – 21 October 1970; 29 September – 29 October 1971; 16 August – 16 October 1974
- 37th Tactical Airlift Squadron, 4 October – 1 November 1970; 8 February – 10 April 1971; 1 September – 5 October 1972; 16 April – 25 June 1974; 15 April – 15 June 1975
- 38th Tactical Airlift Squadron, 16 December 1974 – 15 February 1975
- 39th Tactical Airlift Squadron, 15 December 1973 – 12 February 1974
- 40th Tactical Airlift Squadron, 1 September – 5 October 1971; 11 April – 5 June 1973
- 41st Tactical Airlift Squadron, 12 June – 11 August 1972; 11 February – 13 April 1973; 11 August – 12 October 1973
- 47th Tactical Airlift Squadron, 18 February – 18 March 1970, 16 June – 10 August 1970, 8 December 1971 – 14 February 1972, 11 August – 20 October 1972, and 16 December 1972 – 11 February 1973
- 48th Tactical Airlift Squadron, 12 April – 11 June 1972 and 20 October – 16 December 1972
- 50th Tactical Airlift Squadron, 1 June – 15 August 1974
- 61st Tactical Airlift Squadron, 21 October – 19 December 1970, 5 June – 11 August 1973, 16 October – 16 December 1974, 15–30 June 1975
- 62d Tactical Airlift Squadron, 10 April – 12 June 1971
- 347th Tactical Airlift Squadron, 2 February – 13 April 1970, 12 June – 12 August 1971, and 14 February – 17 April 1972
- 348th Tactical Airlift Squadron, 5 October – 8 December 1971
- 772d Tactical Airlift Squadron, 12 February – 16 April 1974
- 774th Tactical Airlift Squadron, 12 October – 15 December 1973
- 778th Tactical Airlift Squadron, 12 August – 1 September 1971
- 779th Tactical Airlift Squadron, 13 April – 16 June 1970 and 19 December 1970 – 7 February 1971

=== Stations ===
- Rhein-Main Air Base, West Germany 1 January 1970 – 30 June 1975

=== Aircraft ===
- C-130 (1970–1975)
- VC-131 (1973–1974)
- UH-1 (1973)
- Douglas C-9 (1972–1975)
- C-135 (1972–1974)
- VC-118 (1971–1972)
- C-131 (1970–1975)
- Convair VT-29 (1970–1975)
- Douglas VC-54 Skymaster (1970)
- C-47 Skytrain (1970–1972)
- KC-135 (1970–1974)
- C-118 (1970–1972)

== See also ==
- List of inactive AFCON wings of the United States Air Force
- List of Lockheed C-130 Hercules operators
- List of United States Air Force airlift squadrons
