= RAF Grove =

Former Royal Air Force station

RAF Grove USAAF Station AAF-519
- Grove, Oxfordshire in England
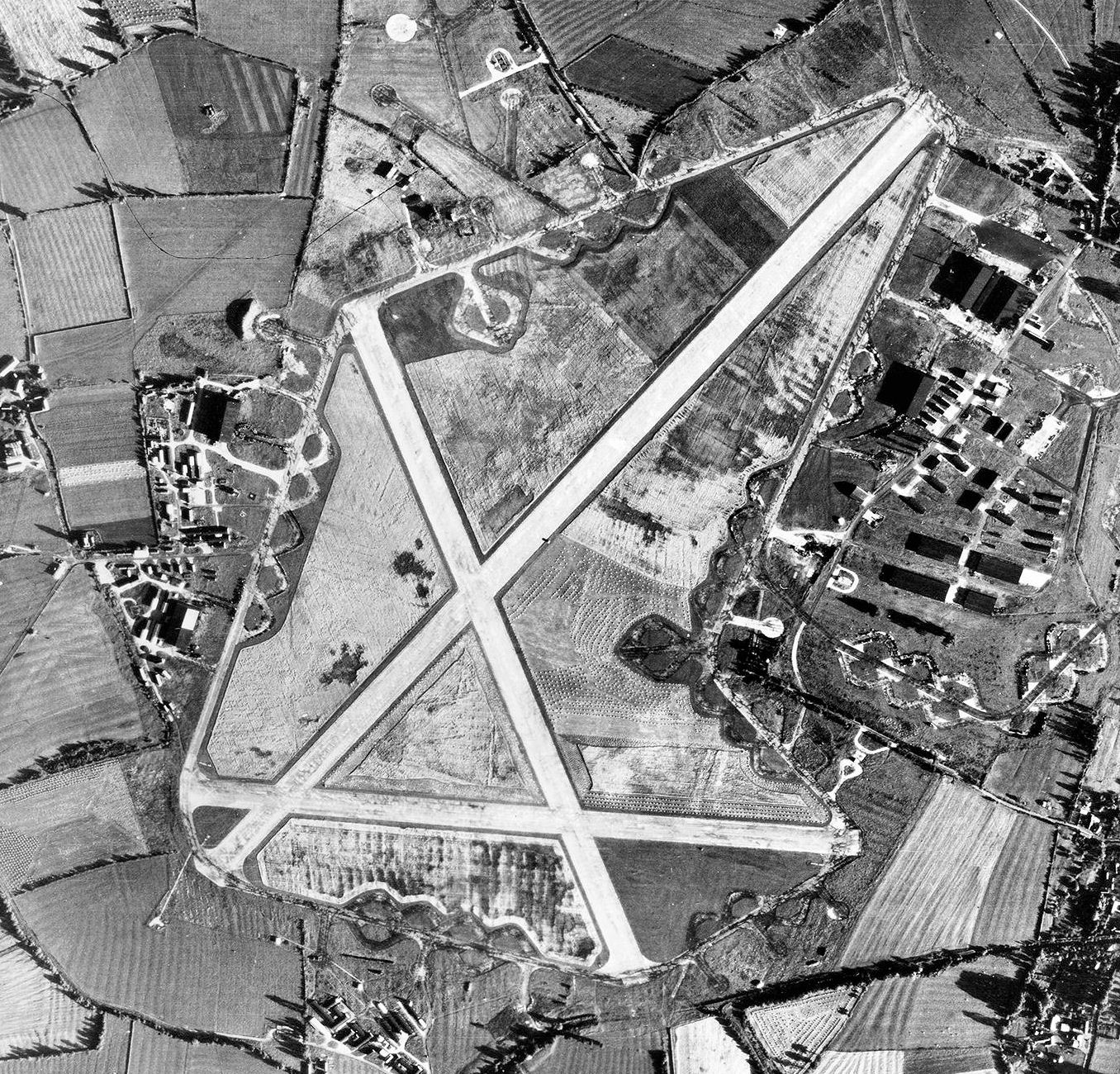
- Aerial photograph of RAF Grove, 6 September 1946

Site information
- Type: Royal Air Force station
- Owner: Air Ministry
- Operator: Royal Air Force; 1942-1943, 1946; United States Army Air Forces; 1943-1946
- Controlled by: RAF Bomber Command; Ninth Air Force

Location
- Shown within Oxfordshire RAF Grove (the United Kingdom)
- Coordinates: 51°36′13″N 001°26′13″W

Site history
- Built: 1942
- In use: 1942-1953
- Battles/wars: European theatre of World War II

Airfield information
- Elevation: 86 metres (282 ft) AMSL
Runways
Direction	Length and surface
04/22	Asphalt
08/26	Asphalt
16/34	Asphalt

Royal Air Force Grove or RAF Grove is a former Royal Air Force station near Grove, Oxfordshire. (Note: Until 1974, Grove was located in Berkshire; it was transferred to Oxfordshire as a result of the Local Government Act 1972) The airfield is located approximately 1 mile (1.6 km) northwest of Wantage.

Opened in 1942, it was used by both the Royal Air Force and United States Army Air Forces. During the Second World War, it was used primarily as a reconnaissance airfield. It was handed back to the RAF in 1947. From 1955, the UK Atomic Energy Authority (UKAEA) used part of the airfield to serve the Atomic Energy Research Establishment at nearby Harwell.

Today the remains of the airfield are located on private property being used as agricultural fields and for a housing development known as Wellington Gate, after the RAF Vickers Wellington, a British bomber which flew from Grove airfield during the Second World War.

== Construction and Royal Air Force use, 1941-1943 ==
Grove was originally a training airfield for Royal Air Force (RAF) Bomber Command 91 Group, and satellite for the No. 15 Operational Training Unit RAF at nearby RAF Harwell.

In May 1941, construction of the airfield began with a standard three concrete runway layout and in 1942, glider pilots from Brize Norton trained there, mainly using Armstrong Whitworth Whitleys and Airspeed Horsas.

== United States Army Air Forces use, 1943-1946 ==
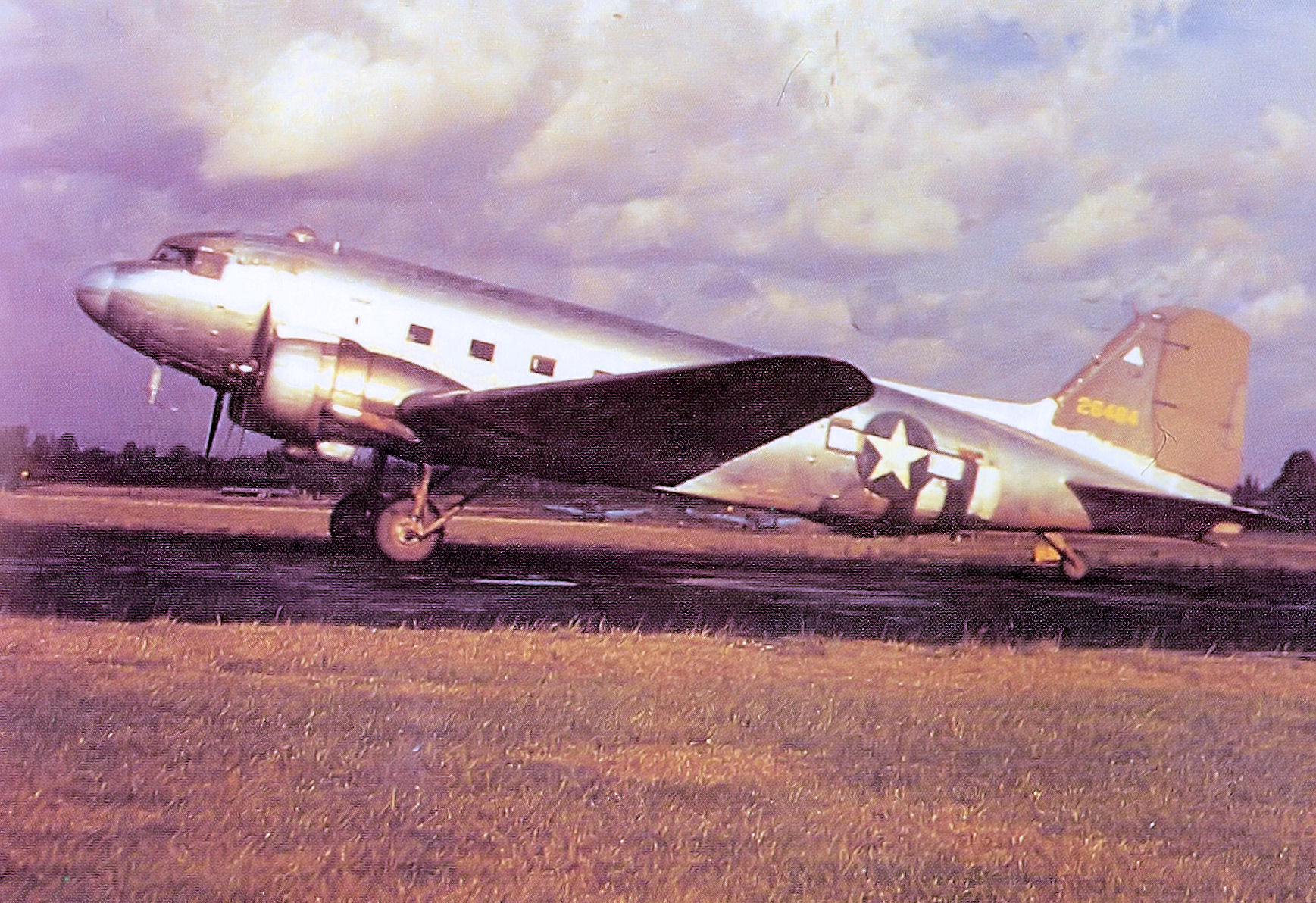
10th Transport Group Douglas C-47B-25-DK Skytrain 44-76404, Summer 1944. Note the D-Day invasion stripes and partial camouflage paint on the vertical stabilizer.

The RAF left Grove in September 1943 to allow the United States Army Air Forces (USAAF) Ninth Air Force to use the base as a staging ground for the planned Normandy landings. Grove was known as USAAF Station AAF-519 for security reasons by the USAAF during the war, and by which it was referred to instead of location.

Beginning in August 1943, Grove was used by the 3rd Tactical Air Depot of IX Air Service Command, repairing Douglas A-20 Havocs and Northrop P-61 Black Widows. Starting on 31 October, the 31st Transport Group, IX Air Service Command used the airfield with Douglas C-47 Skytrains with the mission of transporting cargo and personnel between IX Air Force airfields in the UK. The 31st TG consisted of the 87th, 313th and 314th Transport Squadrons. Air Transport Command had the 310th and 325th Ferrying Squadrons also attached. After D-Day, the Group was impressed for air ambulance and general theatre transport duties until moving to France in September 1944.

In October and November 1945, the 13th Photographic Reconnaissance Squadron (7th Reconnaissance Group) used the airfield before returning to the United States. In addition, the 36th Bombardment Squadron from RAF Alconbury in Huntingdonshire used the airfield after the closure of Alconbury in October 1945. The squadron flew occasional transport missions until they returned to the United States in December 1945, ending American use of the station.

== Postwar use, 1946-1990s ==
RAF Grove was returned to the RAF in 1946. After the war, the airfield was used for surplus aircraft disposal. In 1953, the RAF 431 Equipment Depot serving the 2nd Tactical air force in Germany was transferred from Hamburg to Grove.

From 1955, the UK Atomic Energy Authority (UKAEA) used part of the airfield to serve the Atomic Energy Research Establishment at nearby Harwell. In 1995, former UKAEA housing including that at Grove were sold in their entirety to the Welbeck Estate Group and, following extensive refurbishment, were sold to local buyers.

After the airfield was closed, the entire area has been taken over by agriculture or was used a grass pasture.

== Wellington Gate ==
In 2017, Vale of White Horse District Council granted outline planning approval to Persimmon Homes to develop the northeast part of the former airfield and build a large housing estate on the property, called Wellington Gate after the RAF Vickers Wellington, a British twin-engined, long-range medium bomber which flew from Grove airfield during the Second World War. In 2018, Grove Parish Council suggested as street names for the first phase of the development: Wellington, Windsor, Whitley, Horsa, Dakota, Liberator, Sentinel, Mustang and Norseman - all names associated with the aircraft, both British and American, that flew from Grove airfield during the Second World War.

== See also ==
- List of former Royal Air Force stations
