= 346th Tactical Airlift Squadron =

346th Tactical Airlift Squadron

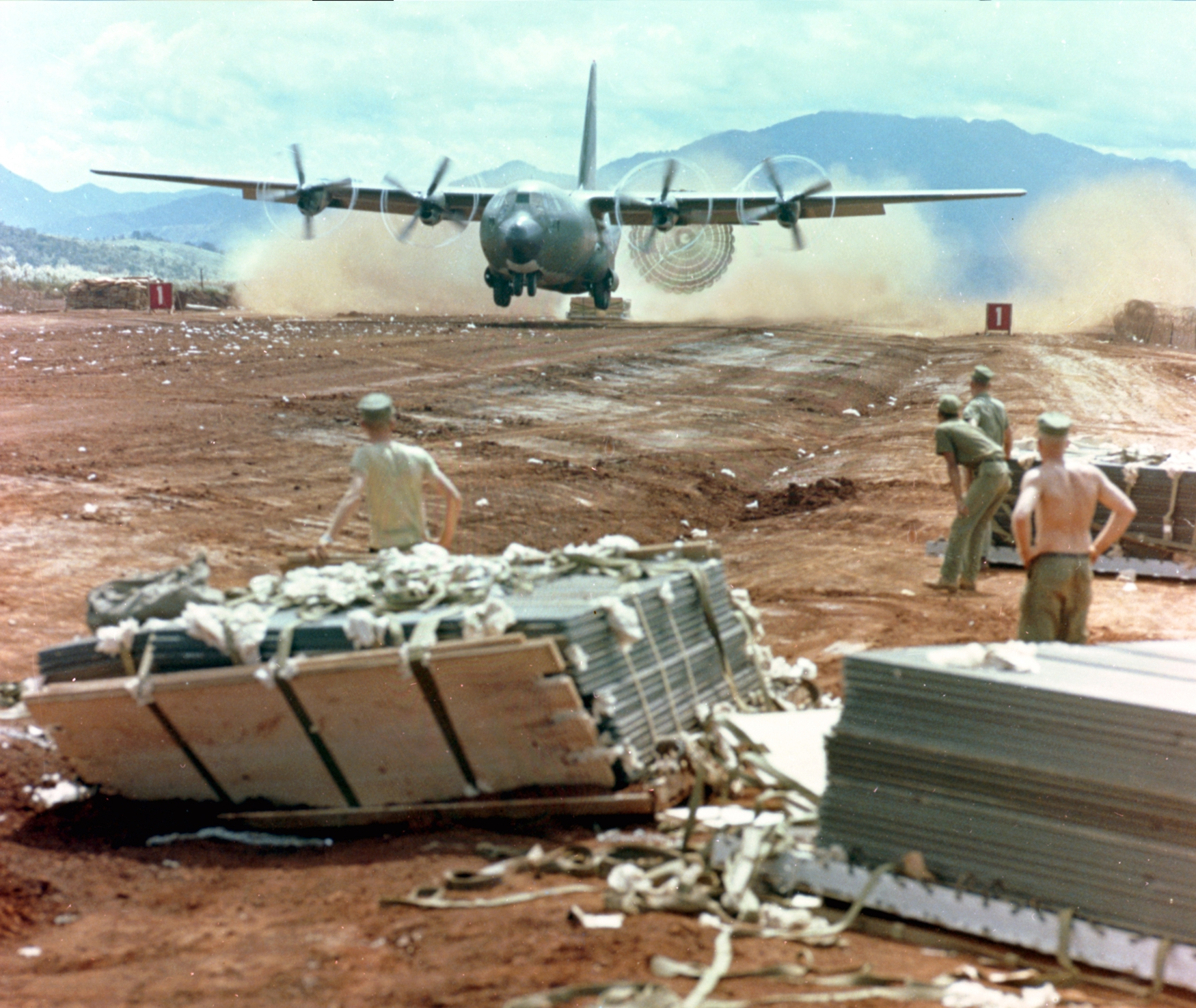
- C-130 Hercules delivering materiel in Viet Nam using the Low Altitude Parachute Extraction System
- Active: 1949–1953; 1955–1956; 1956–1971
- Country: United States
- Branch: United States Air Force
- Role: Airlift
- Part of: Pacific Air Forces
- Engagements: Vietnam War
- Decorations: Air Force Outstanding Unit Award; Vietnamese Gallantry Cross with Palm

Insignia
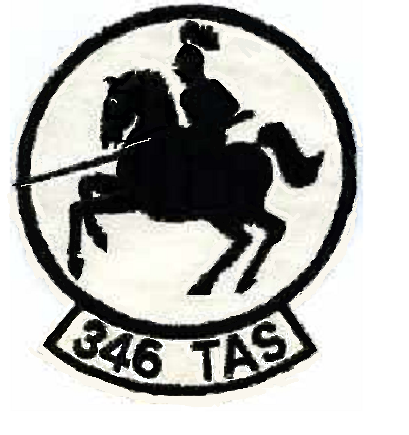
- Patch with 346th Tactical Airlift Squadron emblem

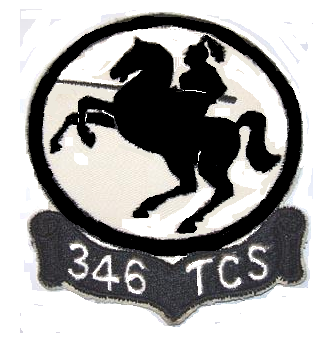
- Patch with 346th Troop Carrier Squadron emblem

The 346th Tactical Airlift Squadron is an inactive United States Air Force squadron that was last assigned to the 314th Tactical Airlift Wing at Ching Chuan Kang Air Base, Republic of China, where it was inactivated in May 1971.

The squadron was first activated as the 346th Troop Carrier Squadron in the Air Force Reserve in 1949 and trained at Memphis Municipal Airport, Tennessee. In 1951 it was called to active duty for the Korean War and served until 1953.

In 1955 the unit was activated at Sewart Air Force Base, Tennessee as a rotary wing troop carrier assault unit in a test of the USAF's ability to support United States Army assault operations. It participated in Operation Sage Brush, which was, in part, a test of this concept. The squadron was inactivated the following year and its aircraft distributed to helicopter support organizations.

A few months later the squadron was activated as a fixed wing troop carrier assault unit at Sewart and equipped with Fairchild C-123 Provider aircraft. It moved to Pope Air Force Base, North Carolina in 1958 when Tactical Air Command consolidated its C-123 units there and continued to fly the Provider until 1963, although after December 1961 most of the squadron was deployed to Southeast Asia.

In 1963 the squadron moved on paper to Dyess Air Force Base and converted the Lockheed C-130 Hercules. The 346th moved to the Pacific in 1969 and began to deploy C-130s to Southeast Asia from Ching Chuan Kang Air Base, (commonly referred to as CCK) where it was assigned to the 314th Troop Carrier Wing. The squadron was inactivated at CCK as USAF operations in Southeast Asia were reduced.

== History ==
=== Reserve training and Korean War callup ===
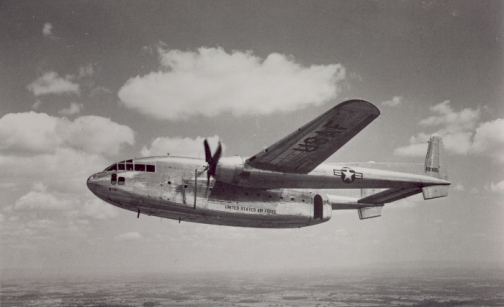
Fairchild C-119 Flying Boxcar

The squadron was activated in the reserves at Memphis Municipal Airport, Tennessee in June 1949 when Continental Air Command implemented the wing base organization, in which combat groups and all supporting units on a base were assigned to a single wing, for its reserve units. At Memphis, it was assigned to the 516th Troop Carrier Group, which absorbed most of the reservists from the inactivating 95th Bombardment Group. The squadron trained under the supervision of the 2584th Air Force Reserve Training Center until April 1951. The 346th was called to active duty that month, and, along with other reserve troop carrier organizations mobilized for Tactical Air Command during the Korean War, formed the new Eighteenth Air Force. It participated in tactical exercises and worldwide airlift. The exercises included a cold weather exercise (Snowfall) and a desert exercise (Longhorn). It converted from Curtiss C-46 Commando to Fairchild C-119 Flying Boxcar aircraft in 1952. The 346th was inactivated and replaced by the 773d Troop Carrier Squadron in January 1953.

=== Helicopter assault operations ===
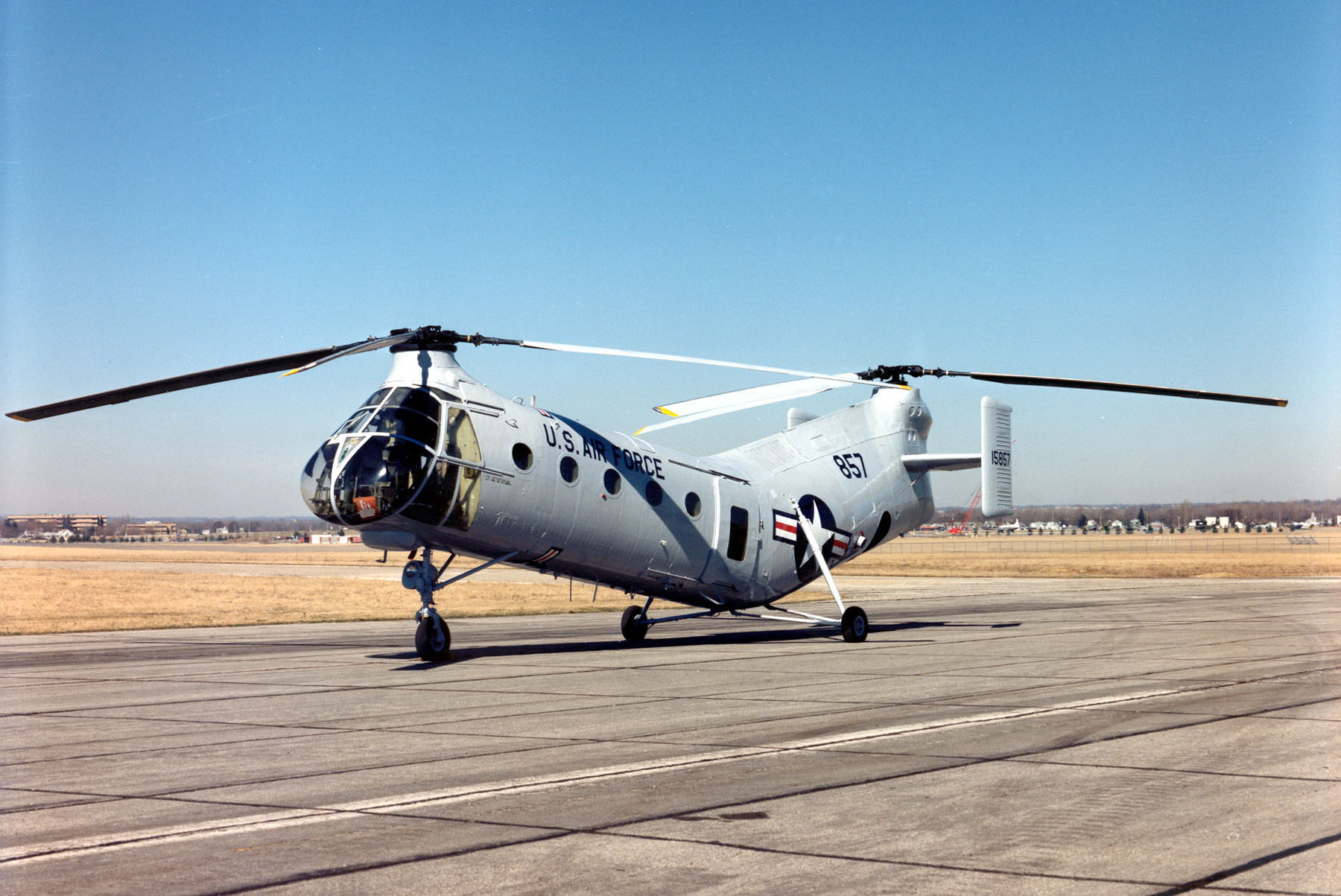
Piasecki H-21 Workhorse

The squadron was reactivated in 1955 and assigned to the 516th Troop Carrier Group at Sewart Air Force Base, Tennessee as the 346th Troop Carrier Squadron, Assault, Rotary Wing in part to test the United States Air Force's ability to provide helicopter airlift to the Army. The 346th was initially equipped with Sikorsky H-19 helicopters, but soon replaced them with Piasecki H-21s. Its operations included participation in Operation Backlash II, which was a survey mission to fix the location of radar sites and support the construction of the Mid-Canada Line. The group also tested the evacuation of key high ranking personnel from Washington DC in the event of a nuclear attack.

The conflict between the Army and the Air Force concerning the use of Air Force helicopters to support Army assault operations was tested in Operation Sage Brush. The 346th operated as part of the aggressor force. The squadron's H-21s were dismantled and transported in Douglas C-124 Globemaster II aircraft in a test of air mobility. Following this test, the 346th was inactivated in July 1956. The helicopters of the squadron were transferred to the 23d Helicopter Squadron.

=== C-123 operations ===
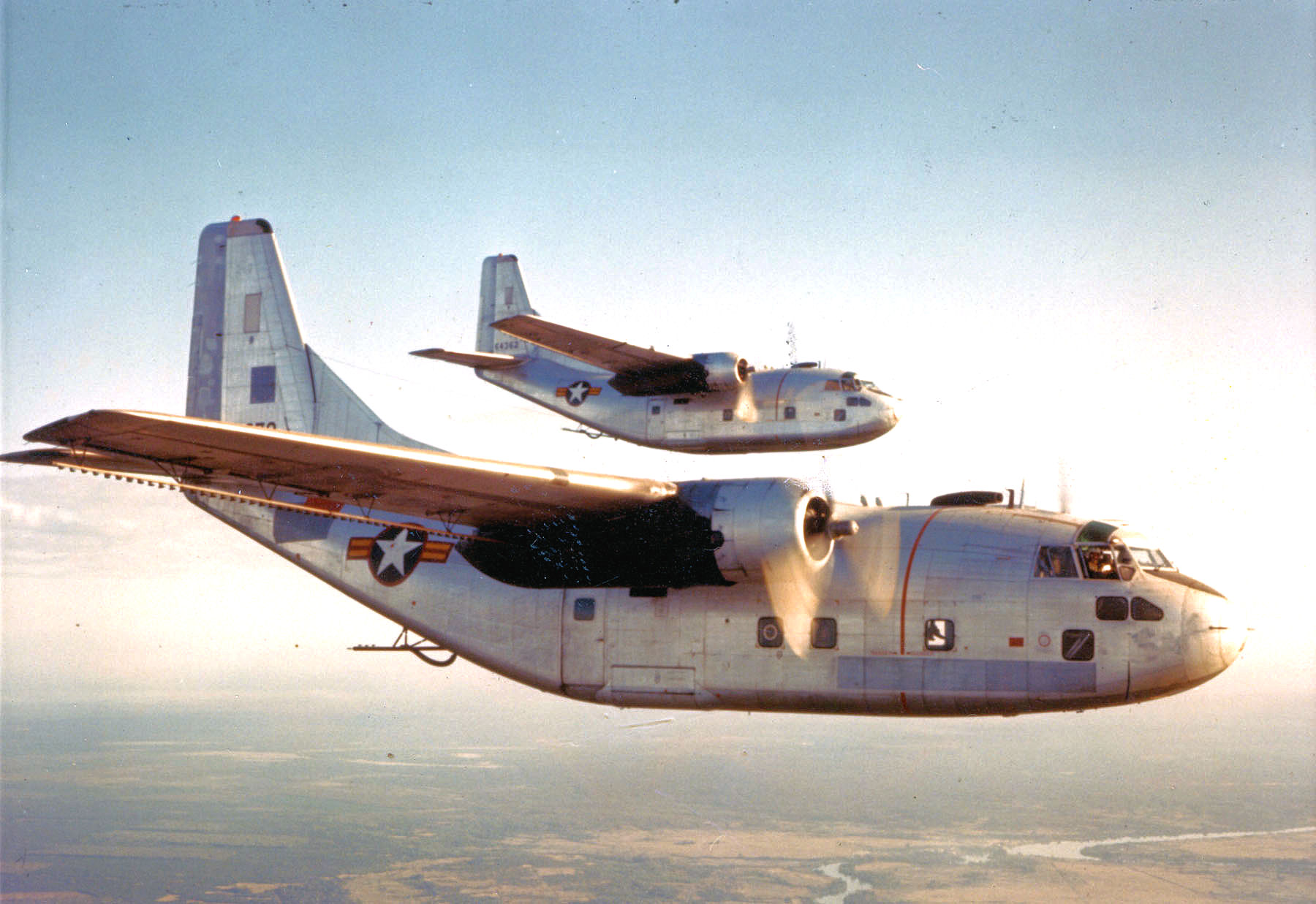
Operation Ranch Hand UC-123Bs in 1962

Three months later, the squadron was reactivated at Sewart as a Fairchild C-123 Provider unit. The squadron trained to airlift troops, equipment and supplies into combat zones, to resupply forces, and evacuate casualties. In 1958, the squadron and most of the C-123s at Sewart were transferred to Pope Air Force Base, North Carolina and the squadron's parent 513th Troop Carrier Wing was inactivated. While at Pope the squadron was attached to the 464th Troop Carrier Wing.

The C-123 was programmed to be removed from service in 1961, but events overtook this decision. On 22 November 1961 the United States offered to provide increased airlift support to the government of the Republic of Viet Nam (South Vietnam). By January 1962, sixteen of the squadron's aircraft had deployed to the Pacific area. Initially, four aircraft were stationed "in country" at Tan Son Nhut Airport outside Saigon. Four more were at Clark Air Base in the Philippines while the remaining aircraft were en route to Clark, where they would be able to rotate "in country." Among their duties, the instructor pilots of the 346th checked out pilots of Air America, which was beginning to operate C-123s as well.

Three of these aircraft had been sent to Olmsted Air Force Base, Pennsylvania for modification, adding MC-1 tanks and aerial spray booms. On 13 January two of these aircraft flew the first mission of Operation Ranch Hand. The Ranch Hand aircraft were later transferred to Detachment 1, 315th Troop Carrier Group, Commando.

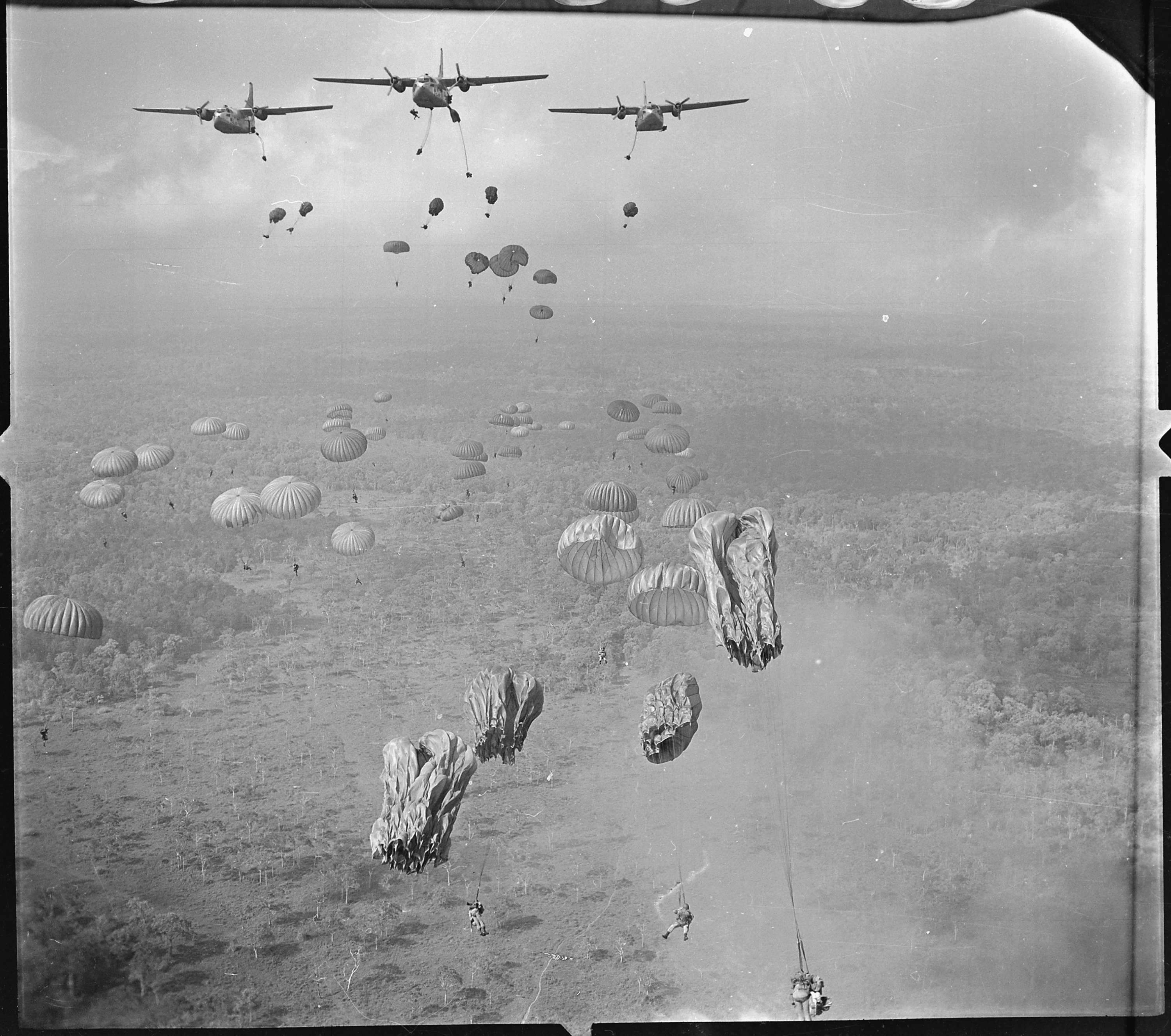
Vietnamese paratroopers jump from USAF C-123s in Operation Phi Hoa II in 1963

The remaining deployed aircraft flew as Operation Mule Train, which was intended to provide the Army of the Republic of Viet Nam (ARVN) with an assault capability with either airdrop or insertion. However, once in place, the unit also filled the need for logistic support to remote sites throughout the country. Mule Train crews often had to operate independently with little air traffic control under marginal weather conditions, flying in and out of small fields located in mountainous areas. In June the squadron was augmented by the 777th Troop Carrier Squadron. The Air Force placed great confidence in young Mule Train aircraft commanders, many of them first lieutenants. They were given authority to conduct operations with little oversight. Two Mule Train aircraft were maintained at Da Nang Air Base (at first referred to by its French name of Tourane Airport) to support northern outposts

The first large airdrop mission by Mule Train took place on 28 June 1962. Sixteen C-123s accompanied by a dozen Douglas C-47 Skytrains of the Republic of Vietnam Air Force (VNAF) dropped paratroops about 35 miles north of Saigon despite a 500-foot ceiling. The Providers even added napalm bombing to their mission. The plane would carry nine wooden pallets, each holding three 55-gallon drums of napalm mixed with gasoline. With a good kicker, the load could go out the back ramp in less than five seconds and leave a pattern of flame 1,200 feet long.

In April 1963 the squadron moved on paper to Dyess Air Force Base, Texas, where it became a Lockheed C-130 Hercules squadron. Its aircraft at Pope were transferred to the newly activated 309th Troop Carrier Squadron, Commando, which moved to Viet Nam three months later.

At Dyess, the squadron performed tactical airlift worldwide, deploying to the Far East, Europe and the Panama Canal Zone. The squadron participated in a constant stream of exercises and operations.

=== Vietnam ===
The 346th had just started a 3-month rotation to Mildenhall RAF in support of NATO when the Tet Offensive occurred in South Vietnam. By the end of February, decisions had been made to increase U.S. forces in South Vietnam in response to the Offensive. On about 5 March 1968, the squadron was informed that the rotation at Mildenhall was being terminated and that the squadron was being moved to Clark Air Base in the Philippines. From there they would commence combat operations within South Vietnam. The move to Clark was accomplished quickly. The squadron returned to Dyess AFB in late May into June 1968. Reportedly, there was an administrative desire to minimize the U.S. troop count in South Vietnam. The Pacific Air Forces (PACAF) C-130 wings were headquartered at Clark Air Base, Ching Chuan Kang Air Base (CCK) in Taiwan, Naha Air Base on Okinawa, and Tachikawa Air Base near Tokyo. When C-130 crews were in South Vietnam, they were on temporary duty (TDY) and thus were not formally assigned there. The arrangement was to spend two or three weeks in-country and then about a week out, then repeat the cycle. They were "shuttled" in and out of the country, not adding to the in-country troop count. The 346th then rotated again from Dyess AFB to Tachikawa AB in December 1968 through January 1969 and operated in South Vietnam. In late January, that rotation was cut short so that the squadron could prepare for a unit move from Dyess AFB to CCK AB for extended operations in South Vietnam. The squadron was thus transferred out of Tactical Air Command (TAC) and into Pacific Air Forces (PACAF). The squadron move to CCK occurred in May 1969.

Generally, the aircrew work-rest cycle for deployed C-130 crews in 1968 through 1970 was 12 hours on and 14 hours off for five cycles. The crew reported for duty in the evening, worked 12 hours, rested 14 hours, then reported for duty two hours later than the previous evening. By the 5th cycle, the crew had delayed its report time 10 hours and was now reporting in the morning. The crew worked 12 hours that day, ate, slept for 12 hours, and then reported for work again that evening. At the end of that night, the crew had been awake for 24 hours. As a result of this work-rest schedule the crews were never properly rested

=== Inactivation ===
The 346th was inactivated in 1971 when the 314th wing returned to the US. The squadron's mission, personnel and equipment were transferred to the 21st Tactical Airlift Squadron, which moved on paper to CCK from Naha Air Base, Okinawa.

== Lineage ==
- Constituted as the 346th Troop Carrier Squadron, Medium on 10 May 1949
- Activated in the reserve on 26 June 1949
- Ordered to active service on 16 April 1951
- Inactivated on 16 January 1953

Redesignated 346th Troop Carrier Squadron, Assault, Rotary Wing on 8 December 1954

- Activated on 8 March 1955
- Inactivated on 9 July 1956

Redesignated 346th Troop Carrier Squadron, Assault, Fixed Wing on 27 July 1956

- Activated on 8 October 1956

Redesignated 346th Troop Carrier Squadron, Assault on 1 July 1958
Redesignated 346th Troop Carrier Squadron, Medium on 1 April 1963
Redesignated 346th Troop Carrier Squadron on 1 March 1966
Redesignated 346th Tactical Airlift Squadron on 1 May 1967

- Inactivated c. 31 May 1971

=== Assignments ===
- 516th Troop Carrier Group, 26 June 1949 – 16 January 1953
- 516th Troop Carrier Group, 8 March 1955 – 9 July 1956
- Eighteenth Air Force, 8 October 1956 (attached to 513th Troop Carrier Group)
- Ninth Air Force, 1 September 1957 (attached to 513th Troop Carrier Group until 8 October 1957, 513th Troop Carrier Wing until 30 June 1958, 464th Troop Carrier Wing until 1 April 1963)
- 516th Troop Carrier Wing, 1 April 1963 (attached to unknown 1 July 1964 – c. 1 September 1964, 513th Tactical Airlift Wing 5 February 1968 – 30 May 1968, 315th Air Division after 7 January 1969)
- 314th Tactical Airlift Wing, 15 March 1969 – c. 31 May 1971 (remained attached to 315th Air Division until 25 March 1969)

=== Stations ===
- Memphis Municipal Airport, Tennessee, 26 June 1949 – 16 January 1953
- Sewart Air Force Base, Tennessee, 8 March 1955 – 9 July 1956
- Sewart Air Force Base, Tennessee, 8 October 1956
- Pope Air Force Base, North Carolina, 1 July 1958
- Dyess Air Force Base, Texas, 1 April 1963
- Ching Chuan Kang Air Base, Taiwan, 15 March 1969 – c. 31 May 1971

=== Aircraft ===
- Curtiss C-46 Commando, 1949–1952
- Fairchild C-119 Flying Boxcar, 1952–1953
- Sikorsky H-19, 1955
- Piasecki H-21 Workhorse ("Flying Banana"), 1955–1956
- Fairchild C-123B Provider, 1956–1963
- Fairchild UC-123B Provider, 1962–1963
- Lockheed C-130 Hercules, 1963–1971

=== Awards and campaigns ===
Award streamer	Award	Dates	Notes
	Air Force Outstanding Unit Award	28 November 1961 – 1 May 1963	346th Troop Carrier Squadron
	Air Force Outstanding Unit Award	1 January 1964 – 31 December 1965	346th Troop Carrier Squadron
	Vietnamese Gallantry Cross with Palm	1 April 1968 – 6 May 1968	346th Tactical Airlift Squadron

Campaign Streamer	Campaign	Dates	Notes
	Vietnam Air Offensive, Phase III	1 April 1968 – 6 May 1968	346th Tactical Airlift Squadron

- Counteroffensive Phase IV, 2 April 1968 to 30 June 1968.
- Counteroffensive Phase VI, 2 Nov 1968 to 2 Feb 1969.
- Vietnam Summer-Fall 1969, 9 June 1969 to 31 Oct 1969.
- Vietnam Winter-Spring 1970, 1 Nov 1969 to 30 April 1970.
- Sanctuary Counteroffensive, 1 May 1970 to 30 June 1970.
