= Memphis Municipal Airport =

- IATA: none; ICAO: none; FAA LID: F21

Summary
- Airport type: Public
- Owner: City of Memphis, Texas
- Serves: Memphis, Texas
- Elevation AMSL: 2,102 ft / 641 m
- Coordinates: 34°44′23″N 100°31′47″W

Map

Runways
Direction	Length		Surface
Direction	ft	m	Surface
8/26	2,750	838	Turf
17/35	4,670	1,423	Asphalt

Statistics (2007)
- Aircraft operations: 2,300
- Source: Federal Aviation Administration

Memphis Municipal Airport (FAA LID: F21) is a city-owned public use airport located one nautical mile (1.85 km) northeast of the central business district of Memphis, a city in Hall County, Texas, United States.

== Facilities and aircraft ==
Memphis Municipal Airport covers an area of 231 acres (93 ha) at an elevation of 2,102 feet (641 m) above mean sea level. It has two runways: 17/35 is 4,670 by 75 feet (1,423 x 23 m) with an asphalt pavement and 8/26 is 2,750 by 70 feet (838 x 21 m) with a turf surface. For the 12-month period ending April 1, 2007, the airport had 2,300 general aviation aircraft operations, an average of 191 per month.

== See also ==
- List of airports in Texas
