= 333rd Troop Carrier Squadron =

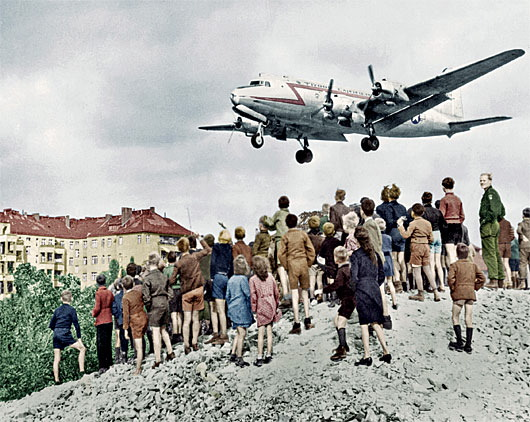
- C-54 landing at Tempelhof Central Airport in 1948
- Country: United States
- Branch: United States Air Force
- Role: Airlift
- Engagements: China Burma India theater

Insignia
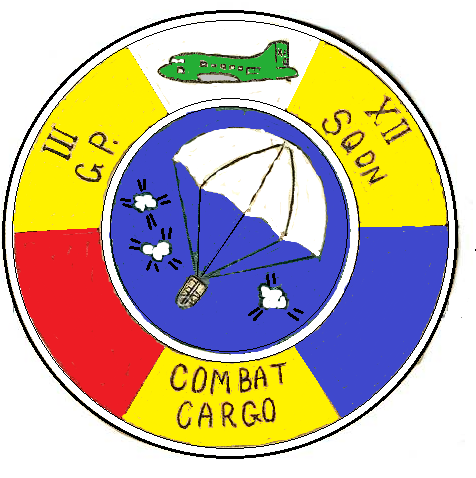
- 12th Combat Cargo Squadron emblem
- World War II tail marking: XII COM CAR

The 333rd Troop Carrier Squadron is an inactive United States Air Force unit. It was activated during World War II as the 12th Combat Cargo Squadron and served in India and Burma before inactivating after V-J Day. The squadron was reactivated in Germany in 1948 and served in the Berlin Airlift until inactivating in 1949.

== History ==
=== World War II ===
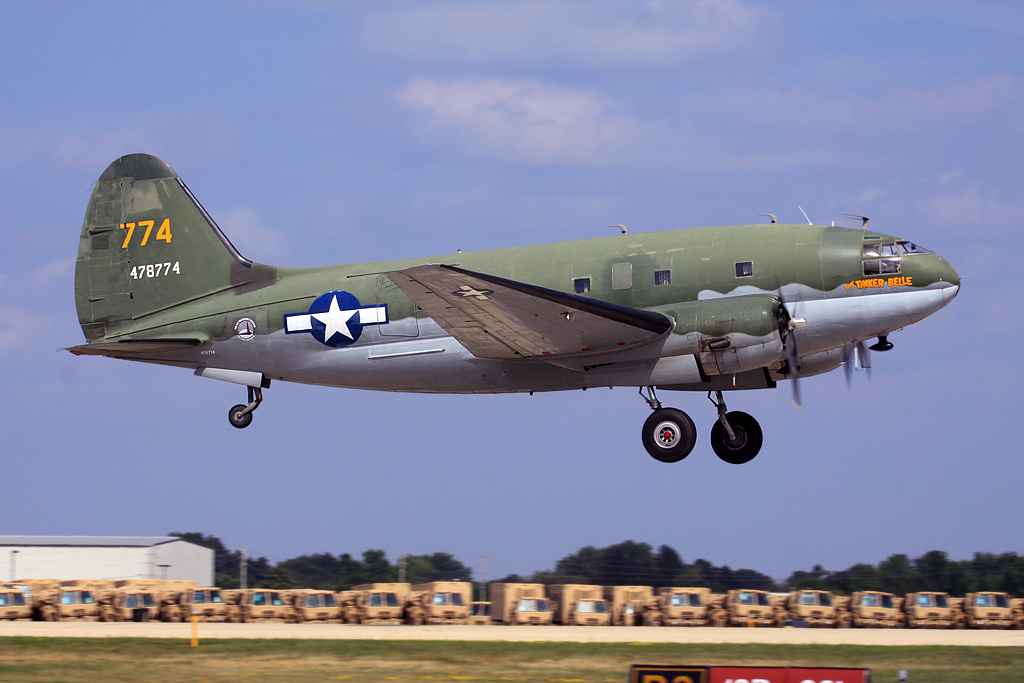
C-46 as flown by the squadron

The squadron was first activated at Sylhet Airfield, India in June 1944 as the 12th Combat Cargo Squadron, one of the four original squadrons of the 3rd Combat Cargo Group. It drew its personnel and Douglas C-47 Skytrains from resources already in the theater. It supported ground forces in the battle for northern Burma and the following drive southward, operating from Dinjan Airfield from August 1944.

The squadron flew Allied troops and materiel to the front, transporting gasoline, oil vehicles, engineering and signal equipment and other items. The squadron either airdropped supplies, or when airfields were available landed them in Burma. It flew aeromedical evacuation missions, flying wounded troops to medical facilities in India. In June 1945, the squadron moved to Myitkyina, Burma, and at about the same time, replaced its C-47s with more capable Curtiss C-46 Commandos. The squadron hauled gasoline and other supplies to bases in western China, flying over the Hump.

Following V-J Day, the 3rd Combat Cargo and its squadrons were redesignated as troop carrier units, with the squadron becoming the 333rd Troop Carrier Squadron. It moved to Shanghai, China in October 1945 and in December, departed for the United States. Upon arrival at the Port of Embarkation, it was inactivated.

=== Berlin Airlift ===
Shortly after the beginning of the Berlin Airlift, the United States Air Force began to augment the C-47s that had been used at the beginning of the airlift with Douglas C-54 Skymasters. C-54s drawn from various Military Air Transport Service (MATS) units were formed into the 1422nd Air Transport Group (Provisional) at Rhein-Main Air Base, Germany on 1 August 1948. On 19 November 1948, the provisional group was replaced by the 513th Troop Carrier Group, and the 333rd was reactivated as one of the group's squadrons. In December, the squadron moved to Wiesbaden Air Base, German, where it was attached to the 60th Troop Carrier Group for airlift operations.

The squadron transported food, coal and other supplies to Berlin. Transport of coal posed particular problems, because it eroded equipment, increasing maintenance requirements to keep up the airlift's demanding schedule. Airlift operations officially ended on 30 September 1949, and the squadron returned to Rhein-Main, ending its attachment to the 60th Group. The end of the airlift coincided with President Truman's reduced 1949 defense budget, which required a reduction in the number of groups in the Air Force to 48. The squadron's C-54s were also needed elsewhere. While its planes were on loan for the airlift, MATS had only been able to meet 60% of its air transport obligations apart from the airlift. As a result, the 333rd was inactivated on 16 October 1949.

== Lineage ==
- Constituted as the 12th Combat Cargo Squadron on 1 June 1944

Activated on 5 June 1944
Redesignated 333rd Troop Carrier Squadron; on 1 October 1945
Inactivated on 6 January 1946
Redesignated 333rd Troop Carrier Squadron, (Special) and activated on 19 November 1948
Inactivated on 16 October 1949

=== Assignments ===
- 3rd Combat Cargo Group (later 513th Troop Carrier Group), 1 June 1944 – 6 January 1946
- 513th Troop Carrier Group, 19 November 1948 – 16 October 1949 (attached to 60th Troop Carrier Group 20 December 1948 – 26 September 1949

=== Stations ===
- Sylhet Airfield, India, 1 June 1944
- Fenny Airfield, India, 6 June 1944
- Moran Airfield, India, 1 July 1944
- Tulihal Airfield, India 1 April 1945
- Ledo Airfield, India, 12 May 1945
- Myitkyina, Burma, 5 June 1945
- Shanghai, China, 7 October 1945 – 15 December 1945
- Fort Lawton, Washington, 5–6 January 1946
- Rhein Main Air Base, Germany, 19 November 1948
- Wiesbaden Air Base, Germany, 20 December 1948
- Rhein Main Air Base, Germany, 26 September – 16 October 1949

=== Aircraft ===
- Douglas C-47 Skytrain, 1944–1945
- Curtiss C-46 Commando, 1945
- Douglas C-54 Skymaster, 1948–1949

=== Campaigns ===
Campaign Streamer	Campaign	Dates	Notes
	India-Burma	2 April 1943 – 28 January 1945	12th Combat Cargo Squadron
	Central Burma	29 January 1945 – 15 July 1945	12th Combat Cargo Squadron
	China Defensive	4 July 1942 – 4 May 1945	12th Combat Cargo Squadron
	China Offensive	5 May 1945 – 2 September 1945	12th Combat Cargo Squadron
	World War II Army of Occupation (Berlin Airlift)	3 December 1948 – 20 September 1949	333rd Troop Carrier Squadron

== See also ==
- List of Douglas C-47 Skytrain operators
