= 347th Tactical Airlift Squadron =

347th Airlift Squadron

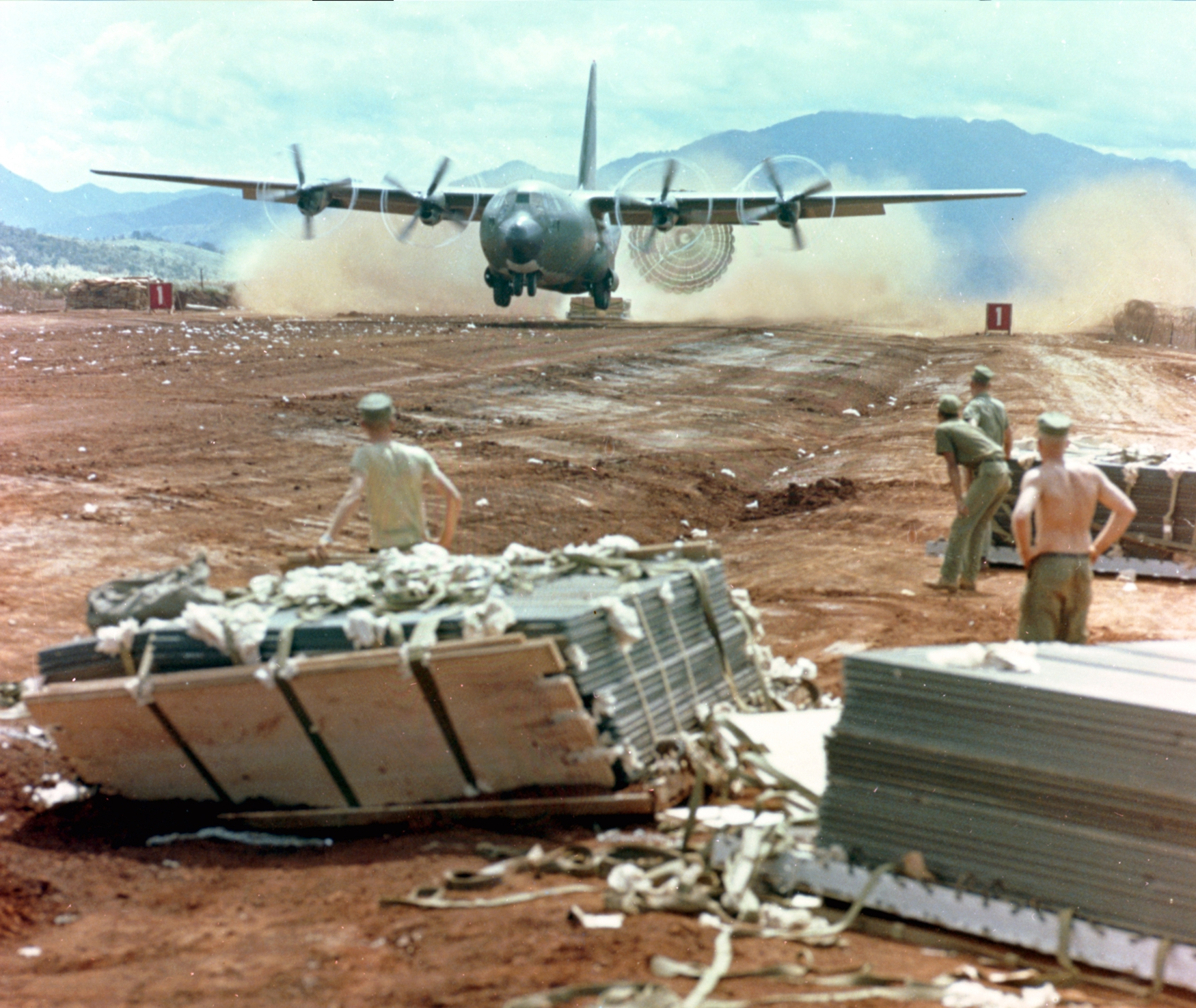
- C-130 Hercules delivering materiel in Viet Nam using the Low Altitude Parachute Extraction System
- Active: 1949–1953; 1955–1956; 1956–1972
- Country: United States
- Branch: United States Air Force
- Role: Airlift
- Part of: Tactical Air Command
- Engagements: Vietnam War
- Decorations: Air Force Outstanding Unit Award; Vietnamese Gallantry Cross with Palm

Insignia
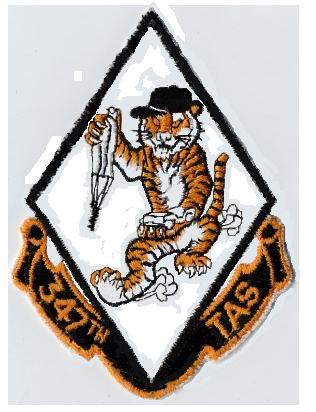
- Patch showing 347th Tactical Airlift Squadron emblem

The 347th Tactical Airlift Squadron is an inactive United States Air Force squadron that was last assigned to the 516th Tactical Airlift Wing at Dyess Air Force Base, Texas where it was inactivated in June 1972.

The squadron was first activated as the 347th Troop Carrier Squadron in the Air Force Reserve in 1949 and trained at Memphis Municipal Airport, Tennessee. In 1951 it was called to active duty for the Korean War and served until 1953.

In 1955 the unit was activated at Sewart Air Force Base, Tennessee as a rotary wing troop carrier assault unit in a test of the USAF's ability to support United States Army assault operations. It participated in Operation Sage Brush, which was, in part, a test of this concept. The squadron was inactivated the following year and its aircraft distributed to helicopter support organizations.

A few months later the squadron was activated as a fixed wing troop carrier assault unit at Sewart and equipped with Fairchild C-123 Provider aircraft. It moved to Pope Air Force Base, North Carolina in 1958 when Tactical Air Command consolidated its C-123 units there. The squadron continued to fly the Provider until 1963, when it moved on paper to Dyess Air Force Base and took over the Lockheed C-130 Hercules aircraft of the inactivating 18th Troop Carrier Squadron. The squadron frequently deployed to Europe and the Pacific until it was inactivated in 1972.

== History ==
=== Reserve training and Korean War callup ===
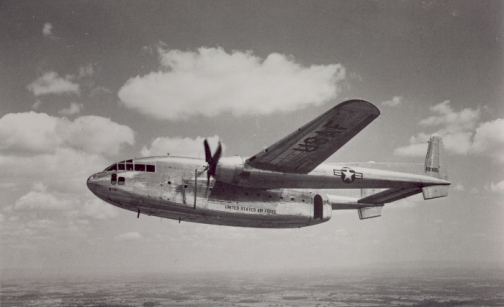
Fairchild C-119 Flying Boxcar

The squadron was activated in the reserves at Memphis Municipal Airport, Tennessee in June 1949 when Continental Air Command implemented the wing base organization, in which combat groups and all supporting units on a base were assigned to a single wing, for its reserve units. At Memphis, it was assigned to the 516th Troop Carrier Group, which absorbed most of the reservists from the inactivating 95th Bombardment Group. The squadron trained under the supervision of the 2584th Air Force Reserve Training Center until April 1951. The 347th was called to active duty that month and, along with other reserve troop carrier organizations mobilized for Tactical Air Command during the Korean War, formed the new Eighteenth Air Force. It participated in tactical exercises and worldwide airlift. It converted from Curtiss C-46 Commando to Fairchild C-119 Flying Boxcar aircraft in 1952. The 347th was inactivated and replaced by the 774th Troop Carrier Squadron in January 1953.

=== Helicopter assault operations ===
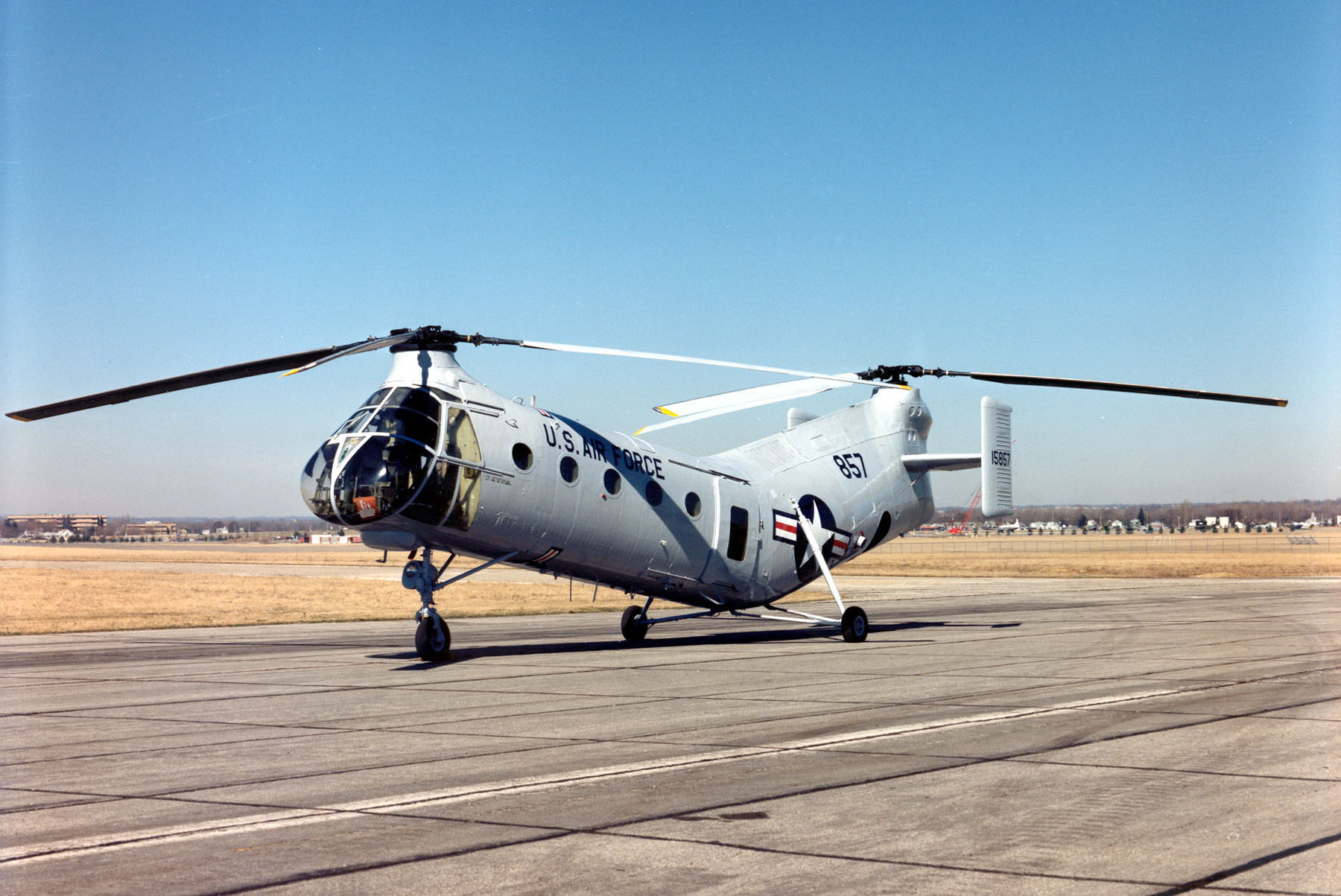
Piasecki H-21 Workhorse

The squadron was reactivated in 1955 and assigned to the 516th Troop Carrier Group at Sewart Air Force Base, Tennessee as the 347th Troop Carrier Squadron, Assault, Rotary Wing in part to test the United States Air Force's ability to provide helicopter airlift to the Army. The 347th was initially equipped with Sikorsky H-19 helicopters, but soon replaced them with Piasecki H-21s. Its operations included participation in Operation Backlash II, which was a survey mission to fix the location of radar sites and support the construction of the Mid-Canada Line. The group also tested the evacuation of key high ranking personnel from Washington DC in the event of a nuclear attack.

The conflict between the Army and the Air Force concerning the use of Air Force helicopters to support Army assault operations was tested in Operation Sage Brush. The 347th operated as part of the aggressor force. The squadron's H-21s were dismantled and transported in Douglas C-124 Globemaster II aircraft in a test of air mobility. Following this test, the 347th was inactivated in July 1956. The helicopters of the squadron were transferred to the 24th Helicopter Squadron, whose mission was support for routine Air Force activities. (Note: The full designation of the 24th was 24th Helicopter Squadron (Support). "Abstract, Vol. 1, History 314 Troop Carrier Wing Jan–Jun 1956". Air Force History Index..)

=== Fixed wing airlift in the United States ===
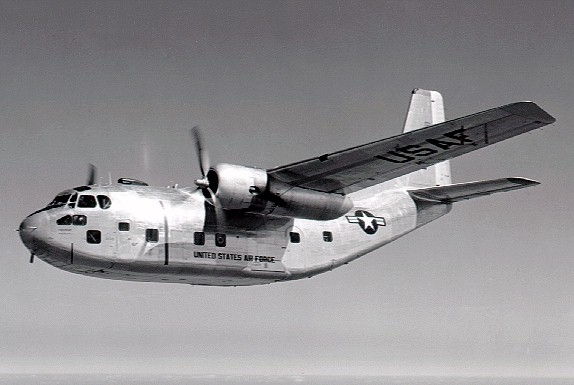
Fairchild C-123 Provider

Three months later, the squadron was reactivated at Pope Air Force Base, North Carolina as a Fairchild C-123 Provider unit. The squadron trained to airlift troops, equipment and supplies into combat zones, to resupply forces, and evacuate casualties. In 1958, the squadron and most of the C-123s at Sewart were transferred to Pope Air Force Base, North Carolina and the squadron's parent 513th Troop Carrier Wing was inactivated.

In July 1963 the squadron moved on paper to Dyess Air Force Base, Texas, where it replaced the 18th Troop Carrier Squadron and assumed its mission, equipment and personnel, when the 18th moved to Sewart. Until it was inactivated in 1972, the squadron participated in a constant stream of exercises and operations. The squadron frequently deployed its crews and aircraft to Europe and the Pacific.

== Lineage ==
- Constituted as the 347th Troop Carrier Squadron, Medium on 10 May 1949
- Activated in the reserve on 26 June 1949
- Ordered to active service on 16 April 1951
- Inactivated on 16 January 1953

Redesignated 347th Troop Carrier Squadron, Assault, Rotary Wing on 8 December 1954

- Activated on 8 March 1955
- Inactivated on 9 July 1956

Redesignated 347th Troop Carrier Squadron, Assault, Fixed Wing on 27 July 1956

- Activated on 8 October 1956

Redesignated 347th Troop Carrier Squadron, Assault on 1 July 1958
Redesignated 347th Troop Carrier Squadron, Medium on 1 July 1963
Redesignated 347th Troop Carrier Squadron on 1 March 1966
Redesignated 347th Tactical Airlift Squadron on 1 May 1967

- Inactivated on 1 June 1972

=== Assignments ===
- 516th Troop Carrier Group, 26 June 1949 – 16 January 1953
- 516th Troop Carrier Group, 8 March 1955 – 9 July 1956
- Eighteenth Air Force, 8 October 1956 (attached to 464th Troop Carrier Wing)
- Ninth Air Force, 1 September 1957 (attached to 464th Troop Carrier Wing)
- 516th Troop Carrier Wing, 1 July 1963 – 1 June 1972 (attached to unknown, 28 May 1964 – c. 20 July 1964, 513th Troop Carrier Wing 22 June 1967 – 27 September 1967, unknown 17 January 1968 – 11 March 1968, 315th Air Division 18 June 1968 – 15 October 1968, 513th Tactical Airlift Wing, 13 June 1969 – 3 September 1969, 322d Air Division, 3 February 1970 – 10 April 1970, 513th Tactical Airlift Wing, 7 September 1970 – 11 November 1970. 322d Tactical Airlift Wing, 4 June 1971 – 10 August 1971, 4 February 1972 – 17 April 1972)

=== Stations ===
- Memphis Municipal Airport, Tennessee, 26 June 1949 – 16 January 1953
- Sewart Air Force Base, Tennessee, 8 March 1955 – 9 July 1956
- Pope Air Force Base, North Carolina, 8 October 1956
- Dyess Air Force Base, Texas, 1 July 1963 – 1 June 1972

=== Aircraft ===
- Curtiss C-46 Commando, 1949–1952
- Fairchild C-119 Flying Boxcar, 1952–1953
- Sikorsky H-19, 1955
- Piasecki H-21 Workhorse ("Flying Banana"), 1955–1956
- Fairchild C-123B Provider, 1956–1963
- Lockheed C-130 Hercules, 1963–1972

=== Awards and campaigns ===
Award streamer	Award	Dates	Notes
	Air Force Outstanding Unit Award	28 November 1961-1 May 1963	347th Troop Carrier Squadron
	Air Force Outstanding Unit Award	1 January 1964-31 December 1965	347th Troop Carrier Squadron
	Vietnamese Gallantry Cross with Palm	15 June 1968-17 October 1968	347th Tactical Airlift Squadron

Campaign Streamer	Campaign	Dates	Notes
	Vietnam Air Offensive, Phase III	15 June 1968 – 17 October 1968	347th Tactical Airlift Squadron
