= 513th Air Control Group =

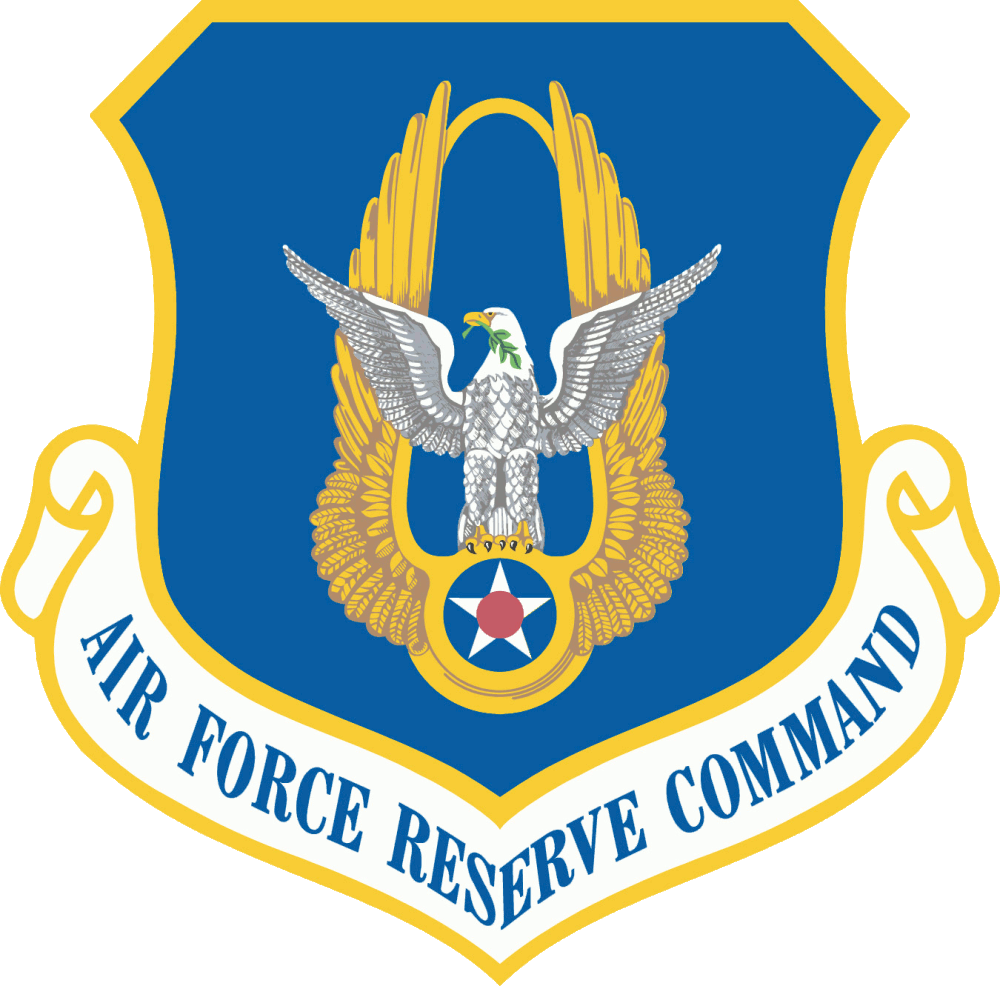
513th Air Control Group

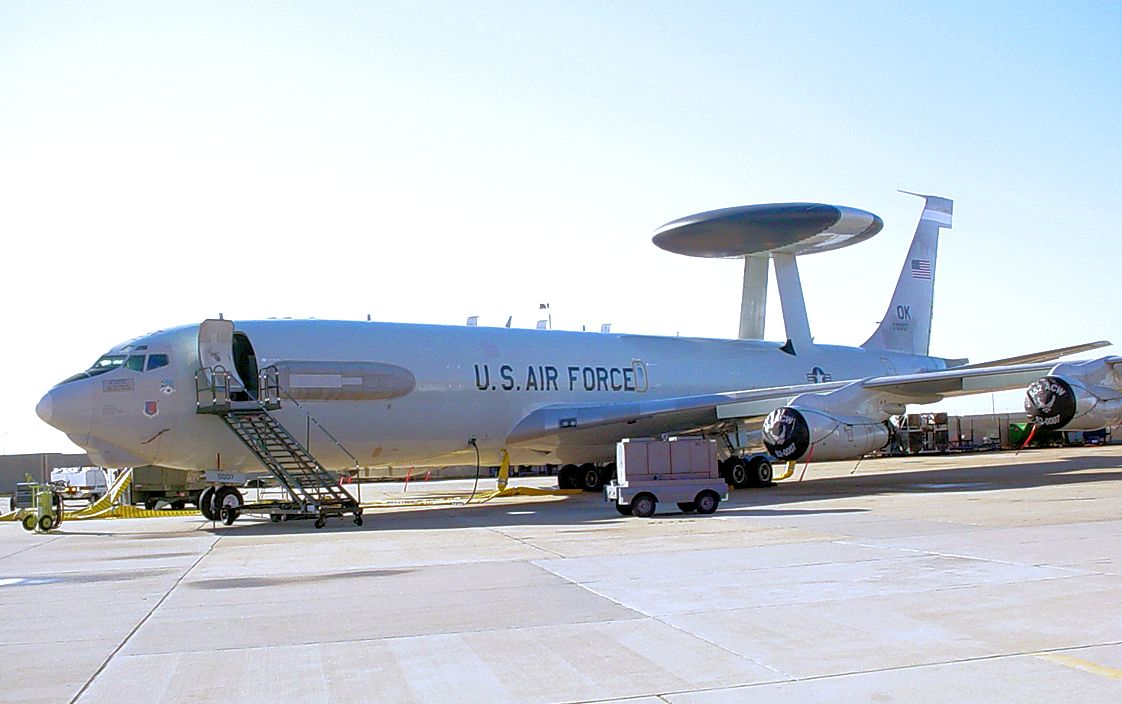
- 513th Air Control Group - Boeing E-3C Sentry 82-0007
- Active: 1944-1946; 1948-1949; 1955-1957; 1957-1958; 1966-1992; 1996-present
- Country: United States
- Branch: United States Air Force
- Type: Group
- Role: Air Control/Early Warning
- Part of: Air Force Reserve Command
- Garrison/HQ: Tinker Air Force Base, Oklahoma
- Mottos: Subsidia Ferimus (Latin for 'We Fly Men and Materiel') (1955-1988)
- Engagements: China Burma India Theater
- Decorations: Navy Meritorious Unit Commendation; Air Force Outstanding Unit Award

Commanders
- Current commander: Col. Anne Ridlon

Insignia
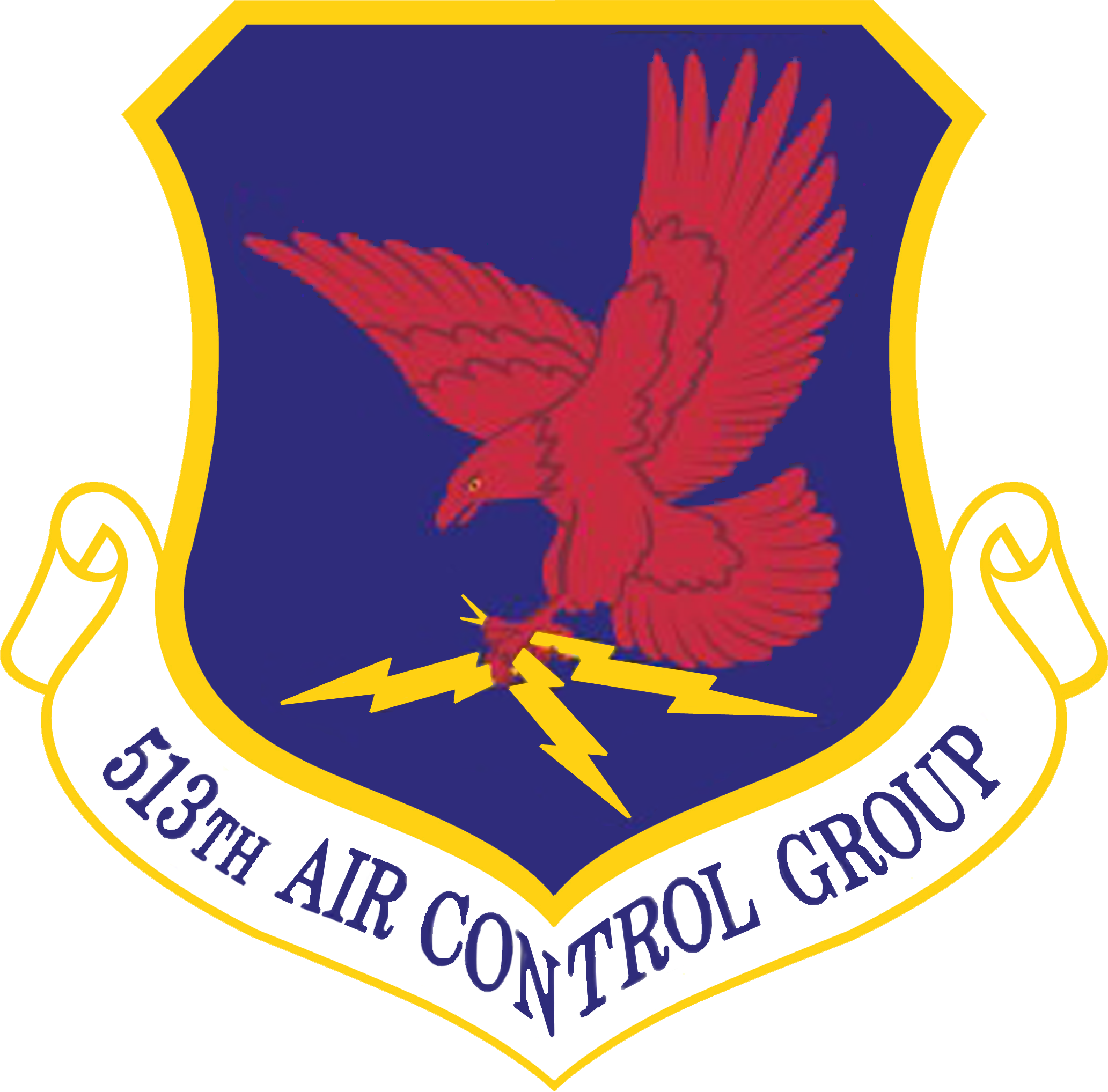
- 513th Air Control Group emblem (Note: Approved 24 October 1988.)

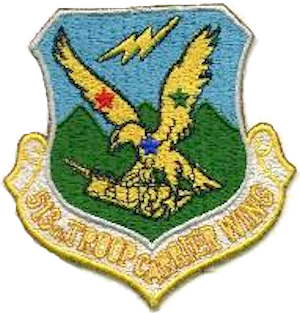
- Patch with 513th Troop Carrier Wing emblem (Note: Approved 3 April 1957 for group, 8 April 1958 for wing.)

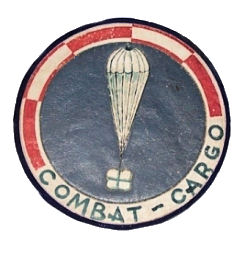
- Unofficial 3d Combat Cargo Group emblem
- Tail code: OK

Aircraft flown
- Electronic warfare: E-3 Sentry

The 513th Air Control Group is an Air Force Reserve group of the United States Air Force. It is assigned to the Tenth Air Force, Air Force Reserve Command, and is stationed at Tinker Air Force Base, Oklahoma.

The group's mission is to provide DOD commanders with trained aircrews and maintenance personnel and systems for airborne surveillance, warning and control of U.S. and allied military aircraft.

The 513th is an associate unit of the 552d Air Control Wing, Air Combat Command (ACC) and if mobilized, the group is gained by ACC.

Its World War II predecessor, the 3d Combat Cargo Group was a United States Army Air Forces combat organization. It served primarily in the China Burma India Theater and Pacific Ocean Theater of World War II. In 1948, the group was redesignated as the 513th Troop Carrier Group.

== History ==
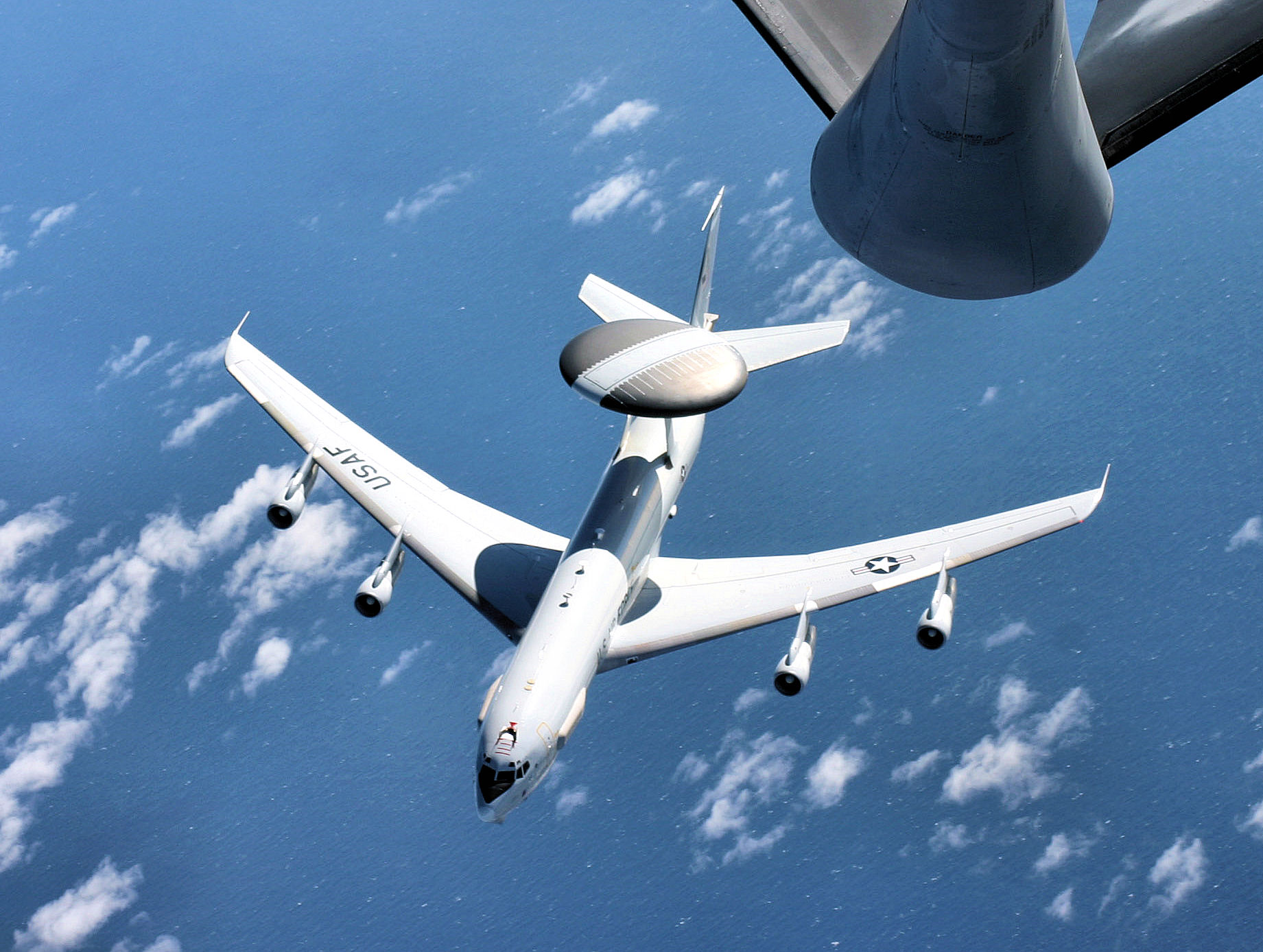
An E-3 Sentry airborne warning and control system aircraft breaks away from a Mississippi Air National Guard KC-135 Stratotanker during a presidential support mission to Argentina

Constituted and activated in India in 1944. Supported ground forces during the battle for northern Burma and the subsequent Allied drive southward. Flew Allied troops and materiel to the front, transporting gasoline, oil, vehicles, engineering and signal equipment, and other items that the group either landed or dropped in Burma. Also evacuated wounded personnel to India. Moved to Burma in June 1945. After the liberation of Burma, the group hauled critical supplies such as gasoline to China. From late 1945, it continued airlift missions as needed in China until April 1946 when inactivated.

Redesignated 513th Troop Carrier Group (Special). Activated in Germany on 19 November 1948. Assigned to United States Air Forces in Europe. Using C-54's, transported food, coal, and other supplies during the Berlin airlift, Operation Vittles. Inactivated in Germany in October 1949.

Activated in the continental United States on 8 November 1955. Assigned to Tactical Air Command and equipped with C-123 aircraft. From November 1955 to November 1958, participated in numerous tactical exercises and operations, including troop drops and airlift in support of construction of the Distant Early Warning Line stations in the Canadian Arctic regions.

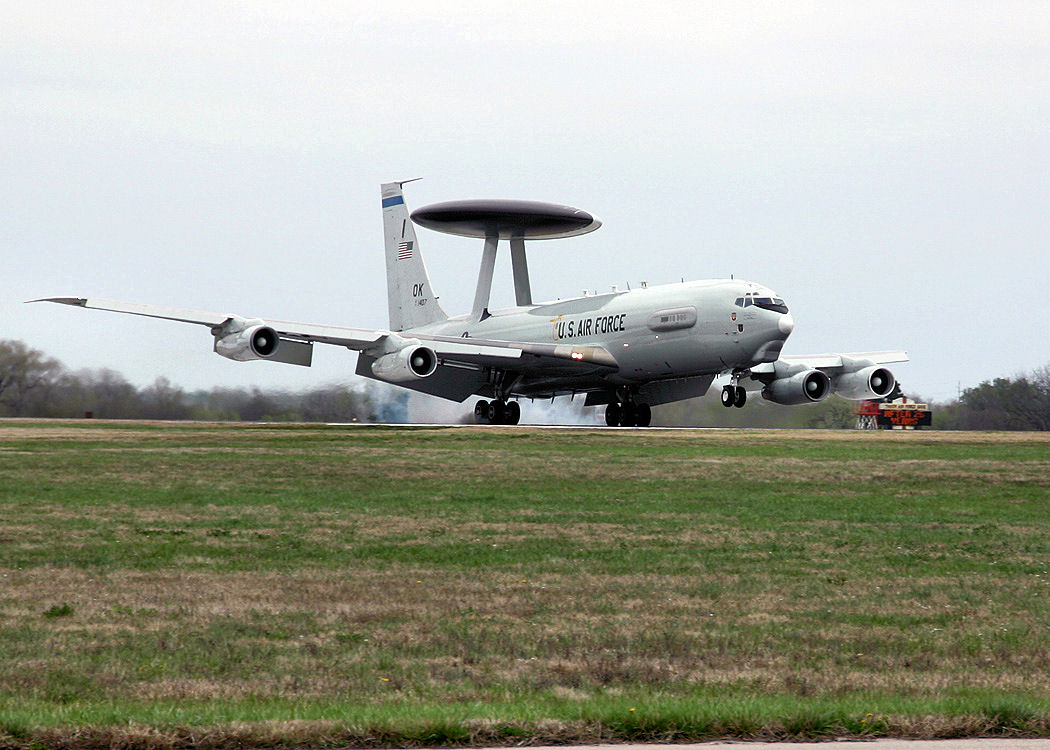
An E-3 Sentry lands here on the Tinker runway on 23 March 2007, after completing one of the many missions done by the aircraft since its arrival at Tinker 30 years ago

From April 1966 to January 1976, the group provided intra-theater airlift in support of U.S. Air Forces in Europe, U.S. European Command, and North Atlantic Treaty Organization operations and exercises, using C-130s and crews rotating to Europe from Tactical Air Command and Military Airlift Command wings based in the United States and C-124s and crews from Air Force Reserve groups. It maintained and operated EC-135s as an airborne command post and acted as host organization for American units at RAF Mildenhall until February 1992. In addition, the group collected samples from the atmosphere for the purpose of detecting and identifying nuclear explosions.

In March 1996 the Air Force re-activated the 513th Air Control Group (513th ACG) as an Airborne Warning and Control System (AWACS) Reserve associate command and control unit in concert with active-duty Airmen. It was intended to help offset the effects of growing mission requirements on the 552 ACW. From March 1996 to April 1997, the group was assigned to the U.S. Air Force Reserve's 507th Air Refueling Wing. It took part in worldwide contingency operations and counter-drug missions. In 1997, the group was reassigned under the command of the active duty 552nd Air Control Wing, while remaining a part of the Air Force Reserve. It is currently the only reserve unit to fly the Boeing E-3 Sentry AWACS aircraft.

By November 1998, Air Force Times reported that '..the 513th is in the final stages of a 2 1/2-year activation plan. Staffing is expected to increase by about 75 more people by fall 1999. Once that happens, officials expect the Reservists to perform 11 percent of aircrew duties on the 552nd's AWACS and fly 5 percent of sorties. Flight hours are expected to increase to 740 by the end of fiscal 1999.'

The 513th ACG's subordinate units include the 970th Airborne Air Control Squadron, the 513th Operations Support Squadron, the 513th Aircraft Maintenance Squadron and the 513th Maintenance Squadron. The current commander, Col. Laurie Dickson who took office January, 2018 is the first female commander of the 513th ACG.

The Air Force's fiscal year 2015 budget request called for the inactivation of the 513th ACG and the retirement of seven E-3 Sentries. The House Armed Services Committee passed an amenedment in May 2014 to block the inactivation of the group and save three aircraft which were intended to be retired.

== Lineage ==
513th Troop Carrier Group

- Established as the 3d Combat Cargo Group on 1 June 1944

Activated on 5 June 1944
Redesignated 513th Troop Carrier Group on 19 September 1945
Inactivated on 15 April 1946

- Redesignated 513th Troop Carrier Group, Special and activated on 19 November 1948

Inactivated on 16 October 1949

- Redesignated 513th Troop Carrier Group, Assault, Fixed Wing on 30 June 1955

Activated on 8 November 1955
Inactivated on 8 October 1957

- Consolidated with the 513th Tactical Airlift Wing as the 513th Tactical Airlift Wing on 31 January 1984

513th Air Control Group

- Established as the 513th Troop Carrier Wing, Assault, Fixed Wing on 26 September 1957

Activated on 8 October 1957
Redesignated 513th Troop Carrier Wing, Assault on 1 July 1958
Inactivated on 1 December 1958

- Redesignated 513th Troop Carrier Wing and activated on 6 April 1966 (not organized)

Organized on 15 April 1966
Redesignated 513th Tactical Airlift Wing on 1 July 1967

- Consolidated with the 513th Troop Carrier Group on 31 January 1984

Redesignated 513th Airborne Command and Control Wing on 18 June 1987
Inactivated on 1 February 1992

- Redesignated 513th Air Control Group on 7 March 1996

Activated in the Reserve on 15 March 1996

=== Assignments ===
- Army Air Forces, India-Burma Sector, China-Burma-India Theater, 5 June 1944

Attached to Third Tactical Air Force, 5 June 1944-unknown, Tenth Air Force, c. 20 August-21 September 1944

- Tenth Air Force, 22 September 1944

Attached to: Air Cargo Headquarters, Tenth Air Force, 1 November 1944 – 30 April 1945, North Burma Air Task Force, Tenth Air Force, 1 May – 11 June 1945

- Army Air Forces, India-Burma Theater, 12 June 1945 (attached to India-China Division, Air Transport Command)
- Tenth Air Force, 16 June-1 August 1945 (remained attached to India-China Division, Air Transport Command)
- Unknown (probably Army Air Forces, India-Burma Theater), 1 August - c. 1 November 1945 (remained attached to India-China Division, Air Transport Command)
- Tenth Air Force, c. 1 November 1945
- Army Air Forces, China Theater, c. 12 November 1945 – 15 April 1946
- 1st Airlift Task Force, 19 November 1948 (attached to 61st Troop Carrier Wing, 19 November 1948, Airlift Wing [Provisional], 26 November 1948, 7497 Airlift Wing, 20 January – 9 July 1949, 61st Troop Carrier Wing, 10 July 1949)
- United States Air Forces in Europe, 26 September - 16 October 1949 (attached to 61st Troop Carrier Wing)
- Eighteenth Air Force, 8 November 1955 (attached to 314th Troop Carrier Wing)
- Ninth Air Force, 1 September 1957 (attached to 314th Troop Carrier Wing)
- 839th Air Division, 8 October 1957 – 1 December 1958
- United States Air Forces in Europe, 6 April 1966 (attached to 322d Air Division after 15 April 1966)
- Third Air Force, 1 July 1966 (attached to 322d Air Division)
- United States Air Forces in Europe, 1 July 1967 (attached to 322d Air Division)
- Third Air Force, 1 November 1968 – 1 February 1992 (sttached to 322d Air Division until 24 December 1968)
- 507th Air Refueling Wing, 15 March 1996
- Tenth Air Force, 1 April 1997 – present

=== Components ===
- Naval Air Transport Squadron 6 (VR-6): attached 19 November 1948 – 31 July 1949.
- 9th Combat Cargo Squadron (later 330th Troop Carrier Squadron): 5 June 1944 – 15 April 1946 (detached 13 July-11 August 1944); 19 November 1948 – 16 October 1949; 8 November 1955 – 1 December 1958
- 10 Airborne Command Control Squadron (later 10 Airborne Command and Control Squadron): 1 January 1970 – 31 December 1991
- 10th Combat Cargo Squadron (later 331st Troop Carrier Squadron): 5 June 1944 – 6 January 1946 (detached 15 December 1945 – 6 January 1946); 19 November 1948 – 16 October 1949; 8 November 1955 – 1 December 1958
- 11th Combat Cargo Squadron (later 332d Troop Carrier Squadron): 5 June 1944 – 2 May 1945 (detached 16 June-12 August 1944); C. 1 November 1945 – 15 April 1946; 19 November 1948 – 16 October 1949; 8 November 1955 – 1 December 1958
- 12th Combat Cargo Squadron (later 333d Troop Carrier Squadron): 5 June 1944 – 6 January 1946 (detached 5 July - 11 August 1944 and 15 December 1945 – 6 January 1946); 19 November 1948 – 16 October 1949 (detached 20 December 1948 – 26 September 1949)
- 32d Tactical Airlift Squadron: attached 5 November 1973 – 15 January 1974 and 5 September - 14 November 1975
- 36th Troop Carrier Squadron (later 36th Tactical Airlift Squadron): attached 21 March – 22 June 1967; 26 February – 19 June 1969; 13 July-14 September 1971; 5 March-16 May 1973; 3 January-15 March 1974
- 37th Tactical Airlift Squadron: attached 21 September - 21 December 1967; 2 December 1968 – 26 February 1969; 2 March-13 May 1970; 13 January - 14 March 1972; and (by 5) September-15 November 1973
- 38th Tactical Airlift Squadron: attached 5 November 1970 – 7 January 1971; 13 September - 16 November 1971; 11 March - 6 May 1972; 7 May – 15 July 1973
- 39th Tactical Airlift Squadron: attached 27 May – 8 July 1968; 7 July - 15 September 1974; 4 July - 14 September 1975
- 40th Tactical Airlift Squadron: attached 11 March - 27 May 1968; 5 March - 15 May 1975
- 41st Tactical Airlift Squadron: attached 12 November 1971 – 17 January 1972; 3 March - 15 May 1974; 5 November 1974 – 16 January 1975
- 47th Tactical Airlift Squadron: attached 12 May – 16 July 1971
- 48th Tactical Airlift Squadron: attached 10 June-c. July 1972
- 61st Troop Carrier Squadron (later 61st Tactical Airlift Squadron): attached 6 May-11 August 1967; 8 April - c. 29 June 1968; 27 May – 6 July 1970; 5 January - 16 March 1973
- 345th Troop Carrier Squadron: attached 8 October 1956 – 12 November 1958
- 346th Troop Carrier Squadron: attached 8 October 1956 – 30 June 1958; 13 February-11 March 1968
- 347th Troop Carrier Squadron (later 347th Tactical Airlift Squadron): attached 22 June - 23 September 1967; 15 June - 6 September 1969; 5 September - 15 November 1970
- 348th Tactical Airlift Squadron: attached 6 September - 16 November 1969; 17 February - 4 March 1970; 7 May – 13 July 1970; 5 January - 15 March 1971; 6 May – 1 June 1972
- 530th Fighter Squadron: attached 15 December 1945 – 16 February 1946
- 772d Tactical Airlift Squadron: attached 5 July - 21 September 1972; 3 November 1972 – 16 January 1973; 5 January - 16 March 1975; 5 November 1975 – 15 January 1976.
- 773d Tactical Airlift Squadron: attached 1 June – 14 July 1972; 28 August - 16 November 1972; 5 July - 5 September 1973; 5 May – 15 July 1974; 5 May – 14 July 1975
- 774th Tactical Airlift Squadron: attached 5 September - 15 November 1974
- 777th Tactical Airlift Squadron: attached 6 August - 13 November 1967; 10 May - 7 August 1969; 11 January - 19 March 1970; 1 – 31 October 1970; 13 March - 12 May 1971
- 778th Tactical Airlift Squadron: attached 7 November 1967 – 13 February 1968; 18 October - 21 December 1969; 7 July - 16 September 1970
- 779th Tactical Airlift Squadron: attached 26 September - 2 December 1968; 7 August - 18 October 1969
- 970th Airborne Air Control Squadron: 15 March 1996 – present
- Military Airlift Squadron Provisional, 1648: attached 8 July 1968 – 10 May 1969
- 7120th Airborne Command and Control Squadron: 1 July 1966 – 1 January 1970
- Troop Carrier Squadron Provisional, 7441: attached 20 July 1966 – 1 March 1967
- Troop Carrier Squadron Provisional, 7442: attached 20 July 1966 – 1 June 1967

=== Aircraft ===
- Douglas C-47 Skytrain, 1944–1946
- Curtiss C-46 Commando, 1945–1946
- Douglas C-54 Skymaster, 1948–1949
- Douglas R5D Skymaster, 1948–1949
- Fairchild C-119 Flying Boxcar, 1955–1956
- Fairchild C-123 Provider, 1956–1958
- Lockheed C-130 Hercules, 1966–1976
- Boeing EC-135, 1966–1992
- Douglas C-124 Globemaster II, 1968–1969
- Boeing WC-135 Constant Phoenix, 1989–1992
- Boeing E-3 Sentry, 1996–present

=== Stations ===
- Sylhet Airfield, India 5 June 1944
- Dinjan Airfield, India 2 August 1944
- Myitkyina Airfield, Burma 3 June 1945
- Shanghai Airport, China 1 November 1945 – 15 April 1946
- Rhein-Main Air Base, Germany, 19 November 1948 – 16 October 1949
- Sewart Air Force Base, Tennessee, 8 November 1955 – 1 December 1958
- Évreux-Fauville Air Base, France, 15 April 1966
- RAF Mildenhall, England, 1 July 1966 – 1 February 1992
- Tinker Air Force Base, Oklahoma, 15 March 1996–present

== See also ==
- Objective, Burma!
- Operation Silk Purse - United States Air Forces in Europe's airborne command and control mission
