= 331 Squadron =

331 Squadron may refer to:

- No. 331 Squadron RNoAF, Norway
- 331st Bombardment Squadron, United States
- 331st Fighter Squadron, later 331st Fighter-Interceptor Squadron, United States
- 331st Tactical Reconnaissance Squadron, United States
- 331st Technical Training Squadron, United States
- 331st Troop Carrier Squadron, United States
- VMA-331 (Marine Attack Squadron 331), United States

== See also ==
- 331st (disambiguation)
