= 331st Troop Carrier Squadron =

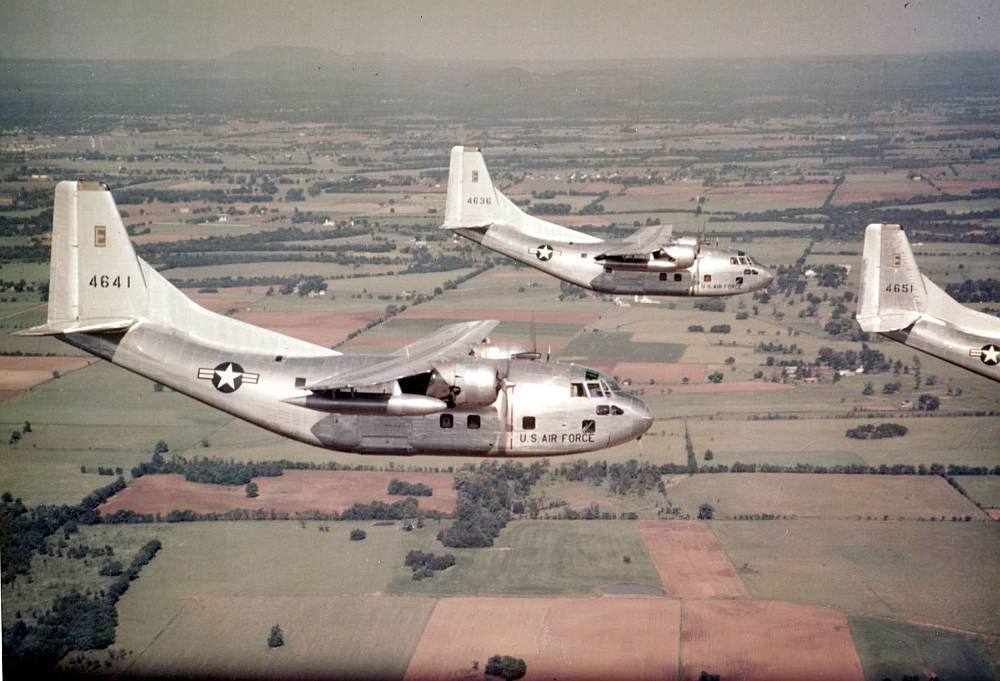
- C-123 Providers in formation (Note: Aircraft are Fairchild C-123B-7-FA Providers, serials 54-636 (converted to C-123K and transferred to Air America in 1968) and 54-641 (transferred to the CIA and crashed in 1965) and Fairchild C-123B-8-FA Provider serial 54-651 (converted to UC-123B, shot down in South Vetnam on 29 November 1965).)
- Country: United States
- Branch: United States Air Force
- Role: Airlift
- Engagements: China Burma India theater
- Decorations: Air Force Outstanding Unit Award

Insignia
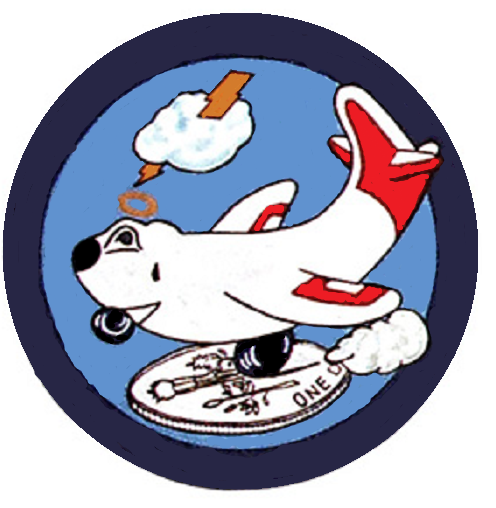
- 331st Troop Carrier Squadron emblem (Note: Approved 16 March 1957. Description: Over a medium blue disc bordered dark blue, a caricatured personified aircraft silver-grey; with wings and tail markings red; with amusing facial expression, iris of eye, nose and tire dark blue; eyeball and teeth white; a halo over his head golden yellow; above the aircraft a white cloud transpierced with a lightning flash golden yellow; the aorcraft landing with one wheel on a silhouetted representation of a dime, silver-grey; a white cloud of dust rising from the landing wheel; all outlines and detail throughout dark blue.)

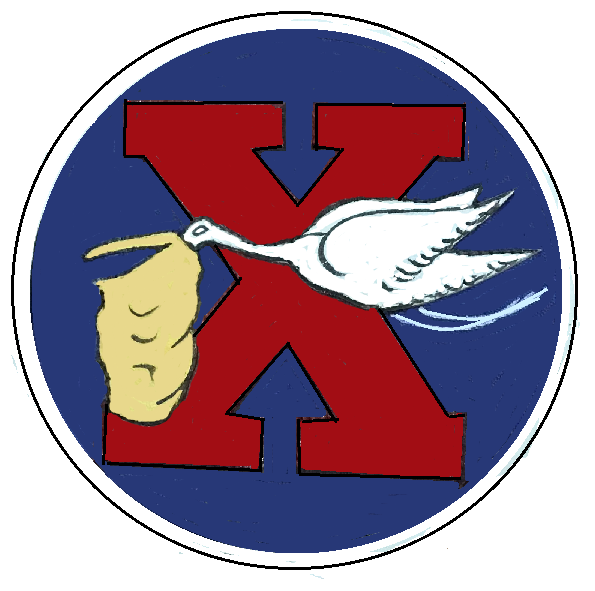
- 10th Combat Cargo Squadron emblem
- World War II tail marking: X COM CAR

The 331st Troop Carrier Squadron is an inactive United States Air Force unit. It was activated during World War II as the 10th Combat Cargo Squadron and served in India and Burma before inactivating after V-J Day. The squadron was reactivated in Germany in 1948 and served in the Berlin Airlift until inactivating in 1949. It was activated again in 1955 as an assault airlift unit, serving until inactivating in 1958.

== History ==
=== World War II ===
The squadron was first activated at Sylhet Airfield, India in June 1944 as the 10th Combat Cargo Squadron, one of the four original squadrons of the 3rd Combat Cargo Group. It drew its personnel and Douglas C-47 Skytrains from resources already in the theater. It supported ground forces in the battle for northern Burma and the following drive southward, operating from Dinjan Airfield from August 1944.

The squadron flew Allied troops and materiel to the front, transporting gasoline, oil vehicles, engineering and signal equipment and other items. The squadron either airdropped supplies, or when airfields were available landed them in Burma. It flew aeromedical evacuation missions, flying wounded troops to medical facilities in India. In June 1945, the squadron moved to Myitkyina, Burma, and at about the same time, replaced its C-47s with more capable Curtiss C-46 Commandos. The squadron hauled gasoline and other supplies to bases in western China, flying over the Hump.

Following V-J Day, the 3rd Combat Cargo and its squadrons were redesignated as troop carrier units, with the squadron becoming the 331st Troop Carrier Squadron. It moved to Shanghai, China in October 1945 and was inactivated there in November.

=== Berlin Airlift ===
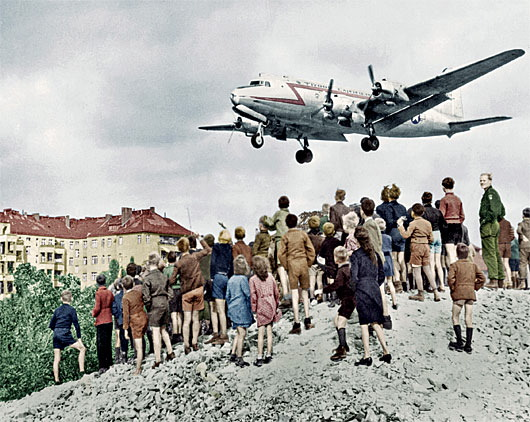
C-54 landing at Tempelhof 1948

Shortly after the beginning of the Berlin Airlift, the United States Air Force began to augment the C-47s that had been used at the beginning of the airlift with Douglas C-54 Skymasters. C-54s drawn from various Military Air Transport Service (MATS) units were formed into the 1422nd Air Transport Group (Provisional) at Rhein-Main Air Base, Germany on 1 August 1948. On 19 November 1948, the provisional group was replaced by the 513th Troop Carrier Group, and the 331st was reactivated as one of the group's squadrons. The squadron transported food, coal and other supplies to Berlin. Transport of coal posed particular problems, because it eroded equipment, increasing maintenance requirements to keep up the airlift's demanding schedule. Airlift operations officially ended on 30 September 1949. The end of the airlift coincided with President Truman's reduced 1949 defense budget, which required a reduction in the number of groups in the Air Force to 48. The squadron's C-54s were also needed elsewhere. While its planes were on loan for the airlift, MATS had only been able to meet 60% of its air transport obligations apart from the airlift. As a result, the 331st was inactivated on 16 October 1949.

=== Assault operations ===
The squadron was reactivated as an assault unit at Sewart Air Force Base, Tennessee on 8 November 1955. It temporarily flew Fairchild C-119 Flying Boxcars until it could equip with Fairchild C-123 Provider. On 8 October 1957, the 513th Troop Carrier Wing activated to replace the 513th Group. The squadron continued to maintain proficiency in assault airlift operations and participated in exercises under Tactical Air Command until its personnel were withdrawn on 15 September 1958. Inactivation followed on 1 December.

== Lineage ==
- Constituted as the 10th Combat Cargo Squadron on 1 June 1944

Activated on 5 June 1944
Redesignated 331st Troop Carrier Squadron; on 1 October 1945
Inactivated on 6 January 1946

- Redesignated 331st Troop Carrier Squadron, (Special) and activated on 19 November 1948

Inactivated on 16 October 1949

- Redesignated 331st Troop Carrier Squadron (Assault, Fixed Wing) on 30 June 1955

Activated on 8 November 1955
Redesignated 331st Troop Carrier Squadron (Assault) on 1 July 1958
Inactivated on 1 December 1958

=== Assignments ===
- 3rd Combat Cargo Group (later 513th Troop Carrier Group), 1 June 1944 – 6 January 1946
- 513th Troop Carrier Group, 19 November 1948 – 16 October 1949
- 513th Troop Carrier Group, 8 November 1955
- 513th Troop Carrier Wing, 8 October 1957 – 1 December 1958

=== Stations ===
- Sylhet Airfield, India, 1 June 1944
- Dergaon, India, 5 August 1944
- Dinjan Airfield, India, 31 August 1944
- Myitkyina, Burma, 3 June 1945
- Shanghai, China, 10 October 1945 – 15 December 1945
- Fort Lawton, Washington, 5–6 January 1946
- Rhein Main Air Base, Germany, 19 November 1948 – 16 October 1949
- Sewart Air Force Base, Tennessee,8 November 1955 – 1 December 1958

=== Aircraft ===
- Douglas C-47 Skytrain, 1944–1945
- Curtiss C-46 Commando, 1945
- Douglas C-54 Skymaster, 1948–1949
- Fairchild C-119 Flying Boxcar, 1955–1956
- Fairchild C-123 Provider, 1956–1958

=== Awards and campaigns ===
Award streamer	Award	Dates	Notes
	Air Force Outstanding Unit Award	19 August 1956–3 December 1956	331st Troop Carrier Squadron

Campaign Streamer	Campaign	Dates	Notes
	India-Burma	2 April 1943 – 28 January 1945	10th Combat Cargo Squadron
	Central Burma	29 January 1945 – 15 July 1945	10th Combat Cargo Squadron
	China Defensive	4 July 1942 – 4 May 1945	10th Combat Cargo Squadron
	China Offensive	5 May 1945 – 2 September 1945	10th Combat Cargo Squadron
	World War II Army of Occupation (Berlin Airlift)	3 December 1948 – 20 September 1949	331st Troop Carrier Squadron

== See also ==
- List of Douglas C-47 Skytrain operators
