= 331st =

331st may refer to:

- 331st Air Expeditionary Group, inactive United States Air Force unit
- 331st Squadron (disambiguation), several units
- 331st Guards Airborne Regiment, formation of the Russian Airborne Troops
- 331st Rifle Division, former infantry division of the Red Army, Soviet Union

== See also ==
- 331 (number)
- 331, the year 331 (CCCXXXI) of the Julian calendar
