= 774th Expeditionary Airlift Squadron =

- A 774th EAS assigned C-130H Hercules maneuvers to conduct a tactical approach & landing at Bagram Air Base, Afghanistan.
- Active: 1943–1945; 1953–1971; 1972–1993; unknown
- Country: United States
- Branch: United States Air Force
- Role: Airlift
- Part of: Air Combat Command
- Nicknames: Green Weasels, Charmed Weasels, Thunder Weasels
- Mascot: Weasel
- Engagements: Mediterranean Theater of Operations; Vietnam War; War in Afghanistan (2001-2021)
- Decorations: Distinguished Unit Citation; Air Force Meritorious Unit Award; Air Force Outstanding Unit Award with Combat "V" Device; Air Force Outstanding Unit Award; Vietnamese Gallantry Cross with Palm; Philippine Presidential Unit Citation

Insignia
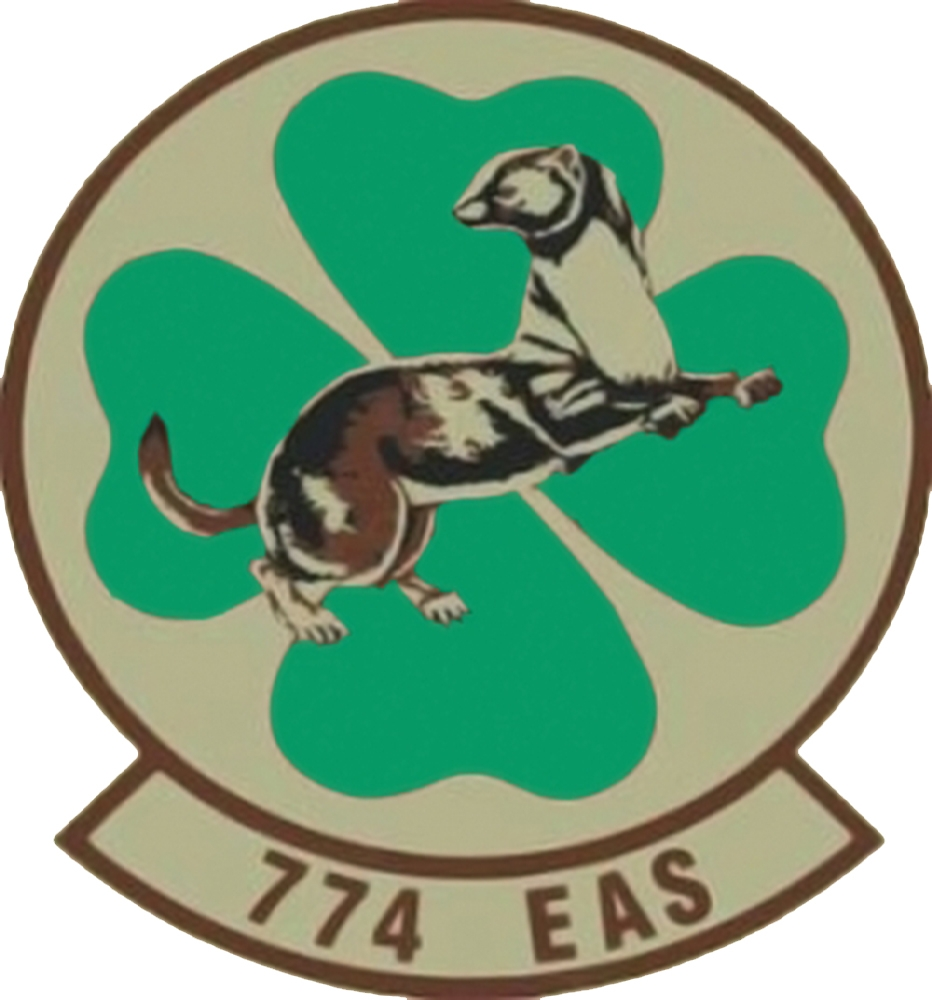
- 774th Expeditionary Airlift Squadron emblem

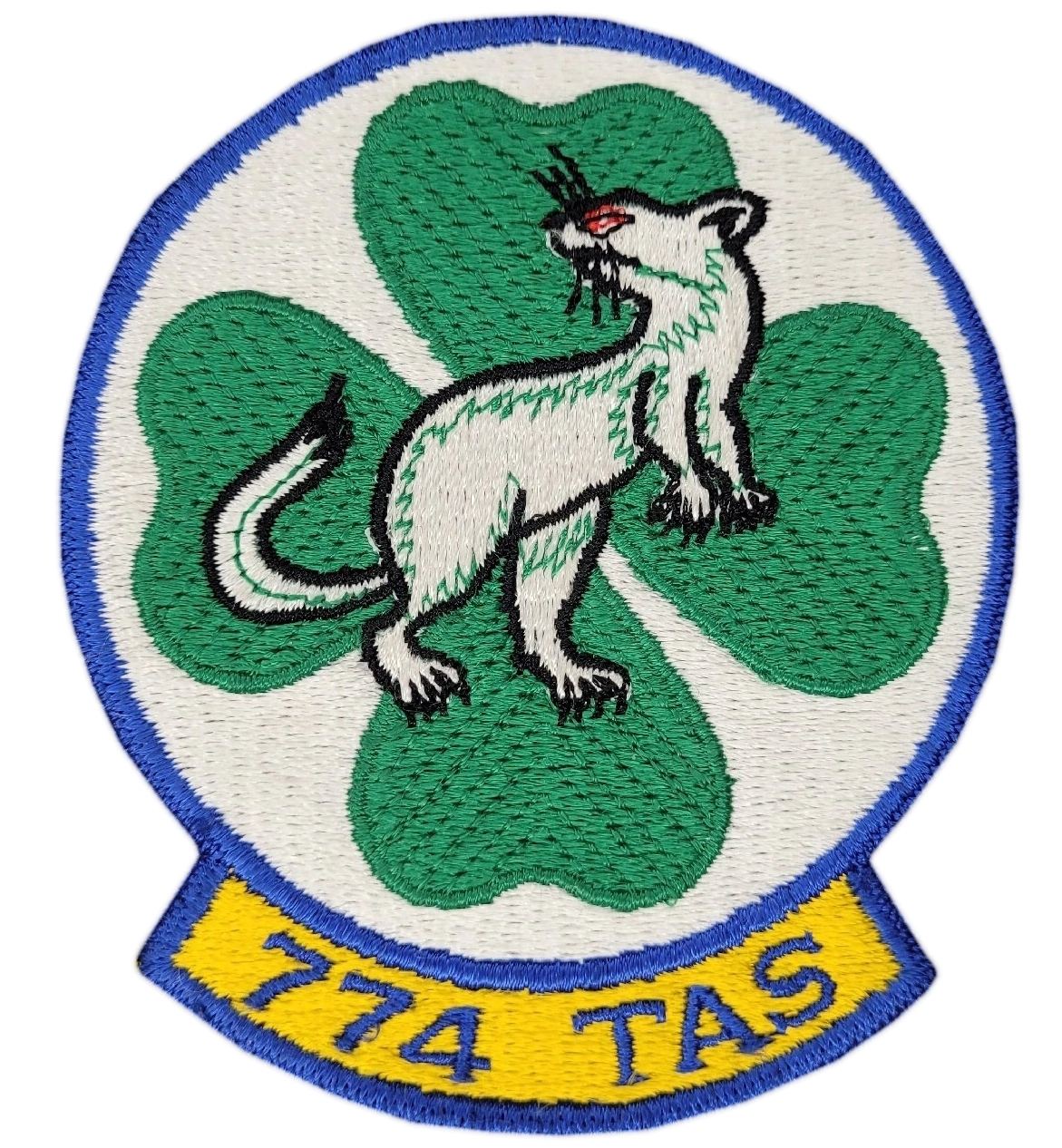
- 774th Tactical Airlift Squadron emblem

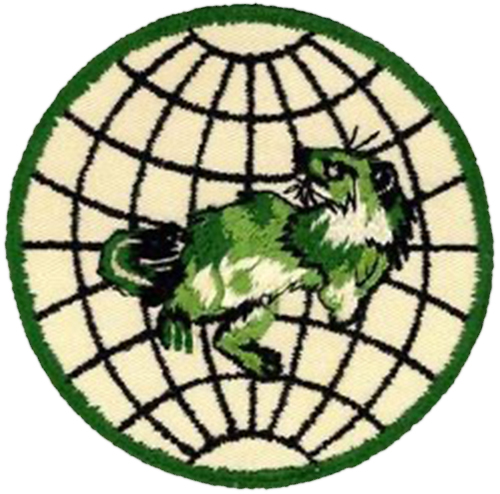
- 774th Troop Carrier Squadron emblem (later version)

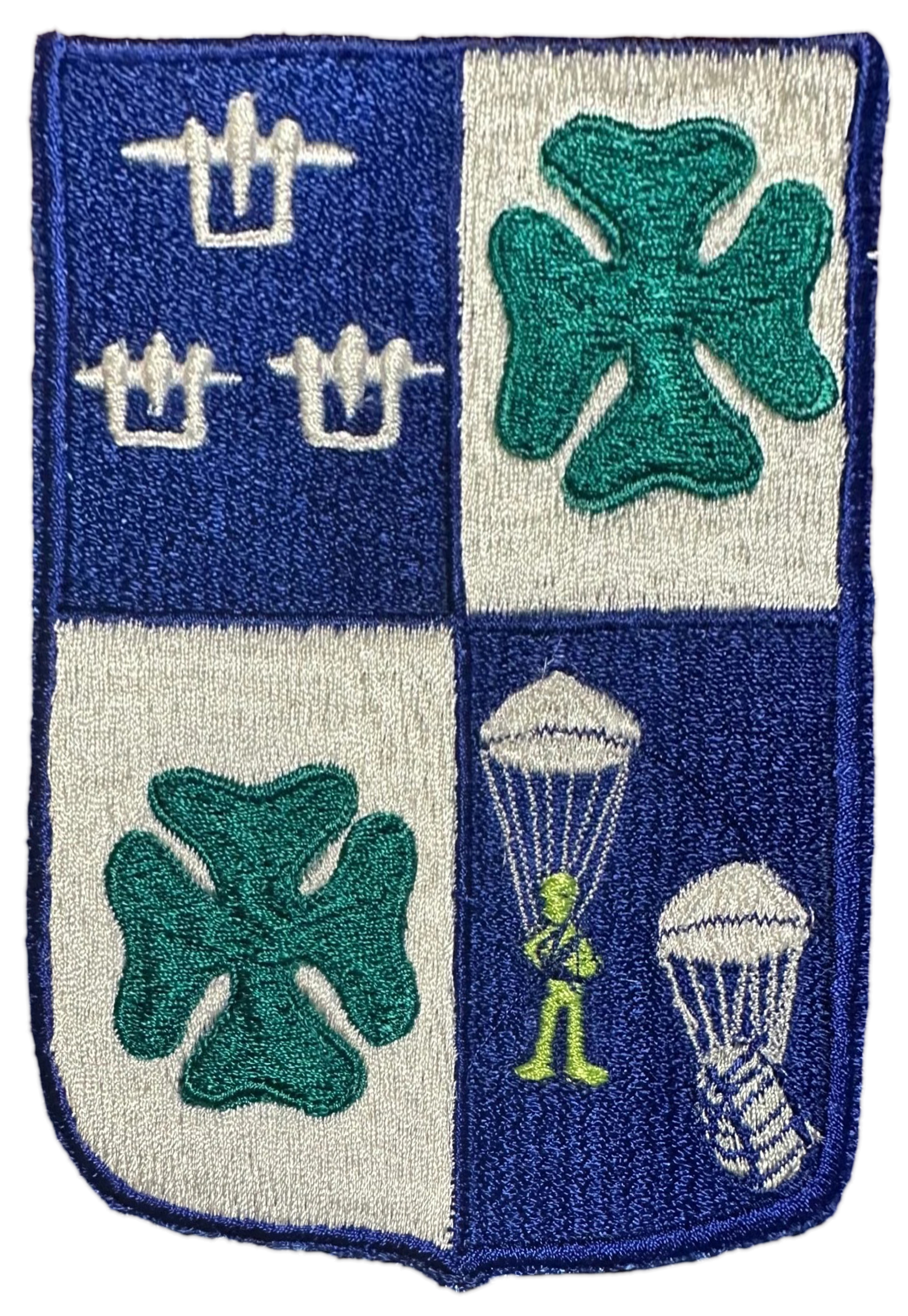
- 774th Troop Carrier Squadron, Medium emblem

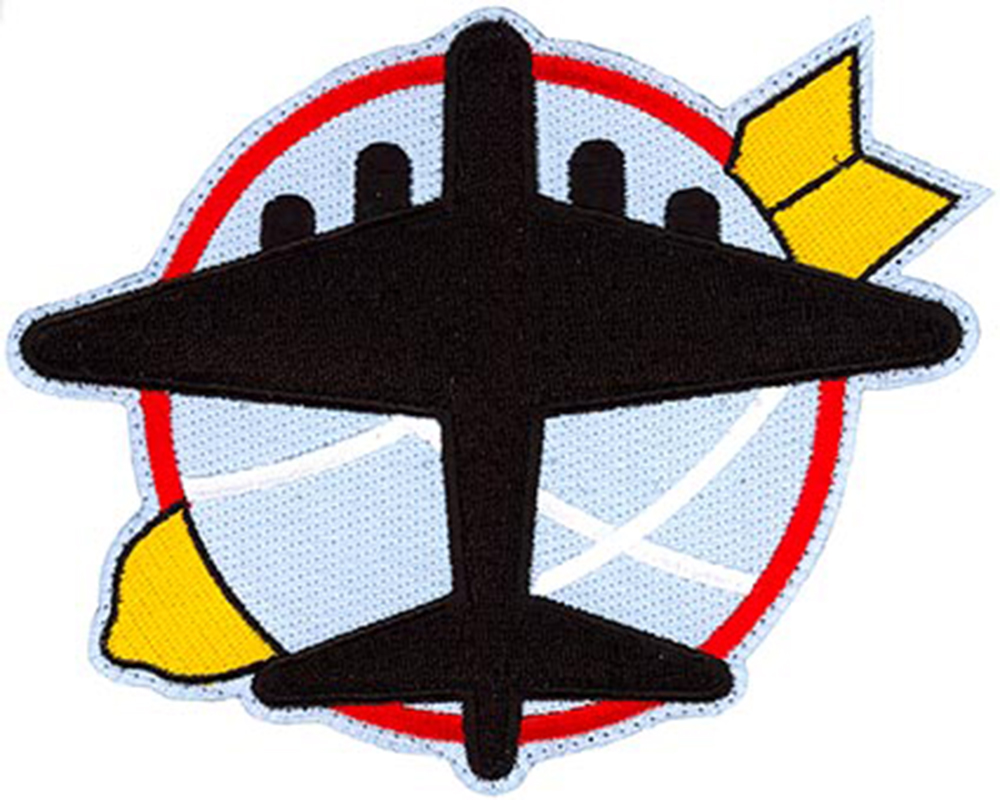
- 774th Bombardment Squadron emblem

The 774th Expeditionary Airlift Squadron was a provisional United States Air Force unit, assigned to the 455th Expeditionary Operations Group at Bagram Air Base, Afghanistan. During the 2010s, the squadron provided C-130 Hercules tactical airlift during the War in Afghanistan (2001-2021). The 774th EAS was inactivated on an unknown date prior to 2020–2021 U.S. troop withdrawal from Afghanistan.

The squadron was first activated as the 774th Bombardment Squadron during World War II. After training in the United States with Boeing B-17 Flying Fortress heavy bombers, it deployed to the Mediterranean Theater of Operations, where it participated in the strategic bombing campaign against Germany, earning two Distinguished Unit Citations before inactivating in Italy.

The squadron was redesignated the 774th Troop Carrier Squadron, Medium and activated in January 1953, when it assumed the mission, personnel and aircraft of a reserve unit that had been called to active duty for the Korean War and was being released from active duty. The squadron provided airlift during a number of contingency operations, and in 1968, moved to the Philippines, from which its crews and planes rotated to Vietnam to provide airlift support during the Vietnam War. The squadron was reactivated the United States, where it continued airlift operations until inactivating in 1986. It was converted to provisional status as the 774th Expeditionary Airlift Squadron in 2001 and assigned to Air Combat Command to activate or inactivate as needed.

== History ==
=== World War II ===
==== Training in the United States ====
The squadron was first activated as the 774th Bombardment Squadron at Geiger Field, Washington on 1 August 1943 as one of the four original squadrons of the 463d Bombardment Group. The 774th moved to Rapid City Army Air Base, South Dakota, where it received its initial cadre. On 1 September, the key personnel of the squadron and 463d Group moved to Orlando Army Air Base, where they participated in advanced tactical training with the Army Air Forces School of Applied Tactics. A model crew from the squadron moved to Montbrook Army Air Field to participate in simulated missions with a Boeing B-17 Flying Fortress. The cadre returned to Rapid City at the end of the month, where the ground echelon of the squadron was filled out and ground school begun.

The squadron moved to MacDill Field, Florida, in November and began flight training with the Flying Fortress, although its air echelon was not fully manned until early December. on 2 February, the squadron's ground echelon departed Florida for the port of embarkation at Camp Patrick Henry, Virginia, for shipment to the Mediterranean Theater of Operations, while the air echelon ferried their B-17s via the southern ferry route.

==== Combat in the Mediterranean Theater ====
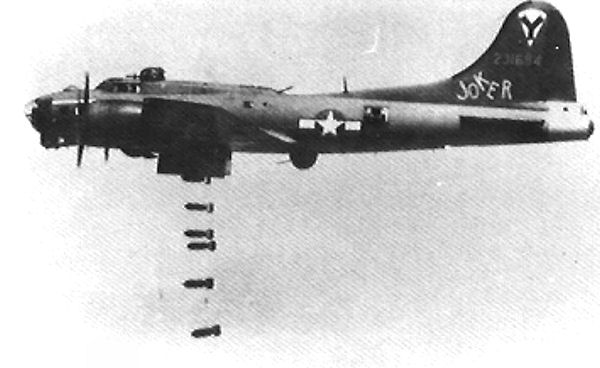
Squadron B-17G Flying Fortress (Note: Aircraft is Boeing B-17G-25-BO Flying Fortress, serial 42-31684, Joker . The plane flew with the 774th Bombardment Squadron from 9 May 1944 until it was downed by an enemy fighter over Blechhammer, while attacking the chemical plants there on 7 July 1944. The aircrew bailed out without major injury to any. Baugher, Joe (9 June 2023). "1942 USAF Serial Numbers". Joe Baugher. Missing Air Crew Report 6864.)

The squadron arrived in Italy in March 1944 and flew its first combat mission from Celone Airfield on 30 March against an airfield at Imotski, Yugoslavia. It engaged primarily in the strategic bombing campaign against Germany. It attacked targets like marshalling yards, oil refineries and aircraft factories in Austria, Czechoslovakia, Germany, Greece, Romania and Yugoslavia.. The squadron was awarded a Distinguished Unit Citation (DUC) for a mission against oil refineries in Ploesti, Romania, on 18 May 1944. Clouds that obscured the target resulted in Fifteenth Air Force recalling the mission, but the squadron and the rest of the 463d Group did not receive the recall message and was the only unit to continue on, causing major destruction to the target. Although crippled by intense fighter attacks, they also inflicted severe damage on the opposing air defenses. On 24 May 1945, the 463d Group led the 5th Bombardment Wing in an attack against a Daimler-Benz tank factory at Berlin, Germany. The squadron made a successful attack despite three separate attacks by enemy air defenses, including attacks by German jet fighters. This action earned the squadron its second DUC.

The squadron was occasionally diverted from its strategic mission to perform air support and air interdiction missions. In May and June 1944, it bombed bridges to support the campaign for the liberation of Rome. In August 1944, it struck bridges, gun positions and other targets to support Operation Dragoon, the invasion of southern France. It hit military airbases, bridges and other tactical targets to support partisan forces and the Red Army advance in the Balkans. During the last months of the war the squadron operated primarily to support Operation Grapeshot, the spring 1945 offensive in Northern Italy.

The squadron flew its final combat mission on 26 April 1945. After V-E Day the squadron transported personnel (primarily soldiers of Fifth Army) from Italy to Casablanca for return to the United States. By early September, the unit had been substantially reduced by transfers to other units and returns of personnel to the United States and it was inactivated in Italy with the end of The Green Project in September 1945.

=== Airlift Operations ===
==== Activation at Ardmore AFB ====
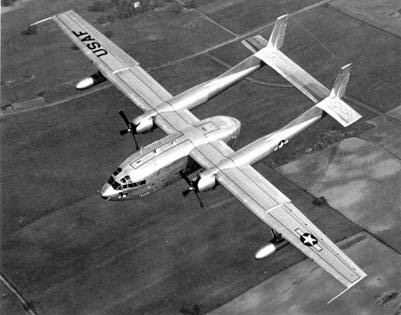
C-119 as initially flown by the 774th TCS

The squadron was redesignated the 774th Troop Carrier Squadron, Medium and activated at Memphis Municipal Airport, Tennessee on 16 January 1953. At Memphis, it absorbed the mission, personnel and Fairchild C-119 Flying Boxcars of the 347th Troop Carrier Squadron, a reserve unit that had been mobilized for the Korean War and was being returned to the reserves. In August, the squadron departed the civilian airfield at Memphis for the newly reopened Ardmore Air Force Base, Oklahoma.

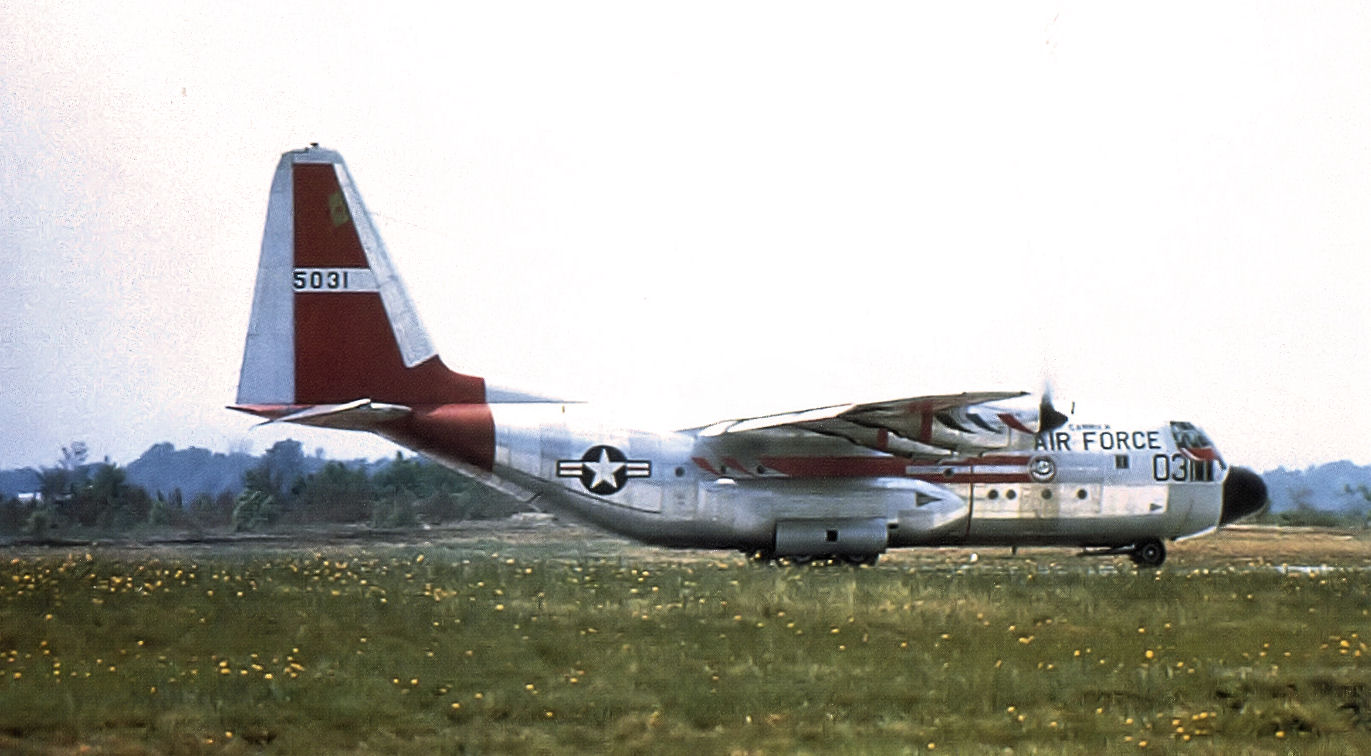
463d Troop Carrier Wing C-130A (Note: Aircraft is Lockheed C-130A-LM Hercules, serial 55-031, Photo taken in 1957. This plane was modified to C-130D configuration and later transferred to the Mexican Air Force. Baugher, Joe (16 May 2023). "1955 USAF Serial Numbers". Joe Baugher.)

The squadron airlifted equipment and supplies and supported Army airborne exercises. The squadron became the first unit to equip with the new Lockheed C-130A Hercules in 1956. In July 1958, president Camille Chamoun of Lebanon was facing an insurgency against his government and requested military assistance from the United States, which implemented Operation Blue Bat. The squadron, along with other elements of the 463d Wing, flew command elements of Nineteenth Air Force and other personnel and equipment of the Composite Air Strike Force to locations in the Middle East. The following month, the squadron provided airlift for the 1958 Taiwan Strait Crisis.

==== The Four Horsemen ====
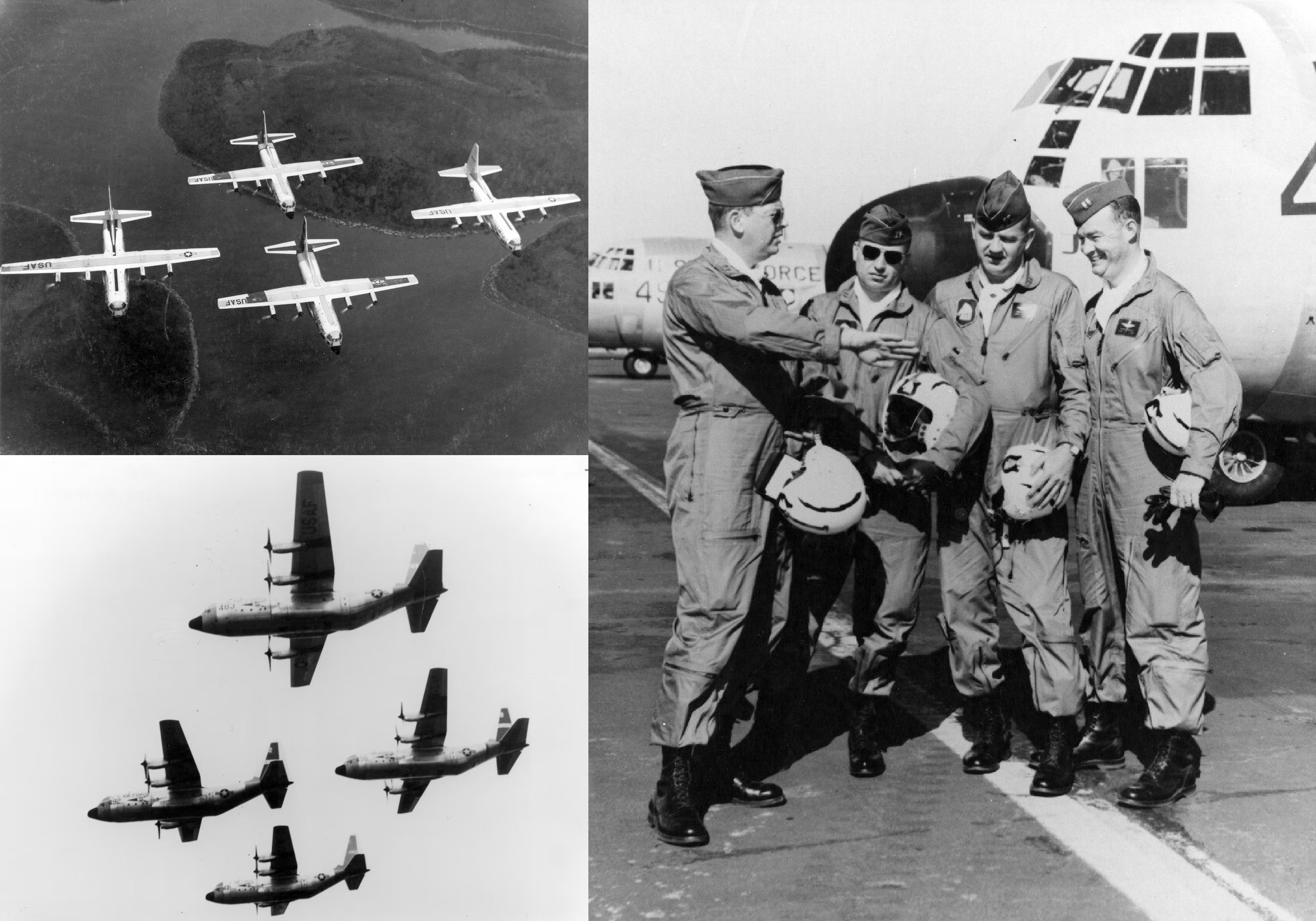
774th Troop Carrier Squadron "The Four Horsemen" C-130 aerial demonstration team 1957

Hercules & The Four Horsemen vintage film 1960

The squadron also operated a Tactical Air Command (TAC) sponsored flight demonstration team beginning in 1957 known as The Four Horsemen utilizing 774th TCS aircrew and 463d Troop Carrier Wing C-130A/B aircraft. The Four Horsemen were the world’s only four engine per-aircraft demonstration team, flying four C-130's in tight formation, the team would perform a number of intricate maneuvers performed at an altitude of 500 to 1,000 feet that closed with a bomb burst — or as the team called it, Horseman Burst. Initially named Thunder Weasels, a tongue-in-cheek combination of the United States Air Force Thunderbirds and Green Weasels nickname of the squadron. Later, they settled on The Four Horsemen after the Four Horsemen of the Apocalypse and University of Notre Dame's famous 1924 football offensive team. The Four Horsemen won official USAF recognition as an aerial demonstration team and performed their routine throughout the United States and overseas in Europe and the Far East until disbanding in 1960.

==== Sewart AFB & Langley AFB Operations ====
Although Ardmore had only been open for six years, the Air Force decided to close the base again. The inactivation of the 513th Troop Carrier Wing, a Fairchild C-123 Provider unit at Sewart Air Force Base, Tennessee, provided room for the 774th and the other operational units of the 463d Wing to move there. In September 1957, Tactical Air Command (TAC) converted the 463d Wing to the dual deputy system. (Note: Under this plan flying squadrons reported to the wing deputy commander for operations and maintenance squadrons reported to the wing deputy commander for maintenance.) The 463d Group was inactivated, and the squadron was assigned directly to the 463d Troop Carrier Wing. The squadron moved to Sewart in November 1958, and soon began replacing its C-130As with C-130B models. While at Sewart, the squadron provided airlift support during the Berlin Crisis of 1961. The squadron was again called on to provide emergency airlift support during the Cuban Missile Crisis in October and November 1962, transporting TAC support forces and materiel to Florida, Army units to stations in the southeastern United States and Marine reinforcements to Guantánamo Bay.

In July 1962, TAC established a Combat Crew Training School at Sewart. Starting with a single squadron, by the spring of 1963, the school had expanded to a full wing, the 4442d Combat Crew Training Wing. As a result of the expansion of the C-130 training unit, the 463d Wing reduced its operations at Sewart and the squadron became nonoperational on 27 December, remaining a paper unit until 1 April 1963, when it was again assigned personnel and equipment at Langley Air Force Base, Virginia. From Langley, the squadron deployed crews and planes to support the US response during the Gulf of Tonkin Incident in the late summer of 1964. In late April 1965, the squadron participated in Operation Power Pack. Following a military coup in the Dominican Republic, Nineteenth Air Force formed an airlift task force to airlift the 82nd Airborne Division. On 28 and 29 April, the squadron flew to Pope Air Force Base to join the task force transporting elements of the 82nd Division to San Isidro Air Base. By September, peacekeeping functions had been transferred to Latin American counties' forces and the squadron helped return American forces to the United States.

=== Vietnam War ===
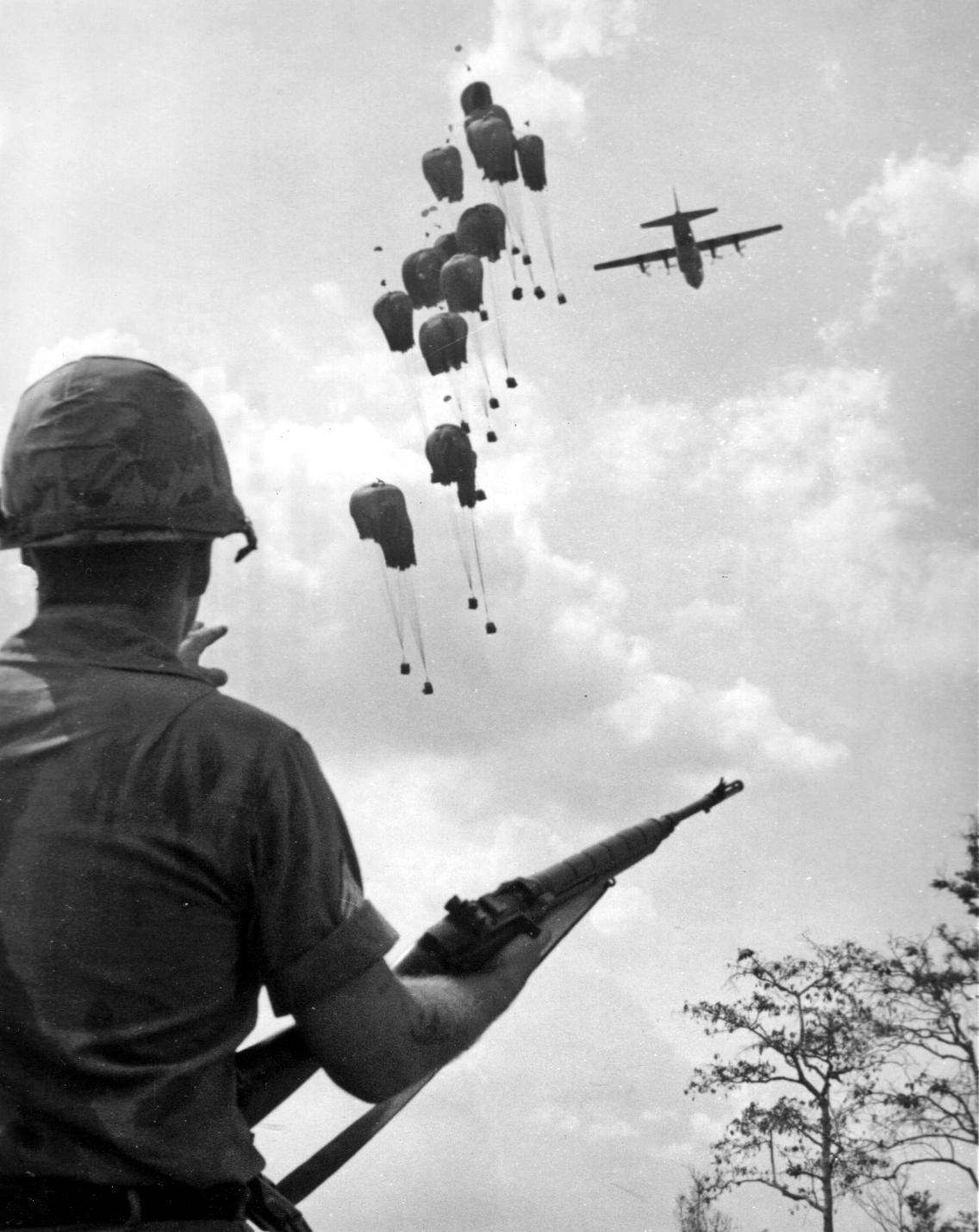
Airdrop of supplies in Operation Junction City 1967

While participating in Operation Power Pack, the squadron was also deploying forces to airlift personnel and material to Southeast Asia. In November 1965, the 463d Wing moved to Mactan Island Airfield, Philippines to provide this support full time, and the squadron moved with it.

The squadron deployed crews and planes operating combat airlift missions in Vietnam under the operational control of the 315th Air Division. (Note: After October 1966, 834th Air Division assumed operational control over airlift in Vietnam. Ravenstein, p. 258.) The squadron also flew aeromedical evacuation missions. On 22 February 1967, the 774th flew missions supporting the Operation Junction City airborne assault force, airdropping heavy-equipment and supplies for 2nd Battalion, 503rd Infantry Regiment and 173rd Airborne Brigade ground forces.

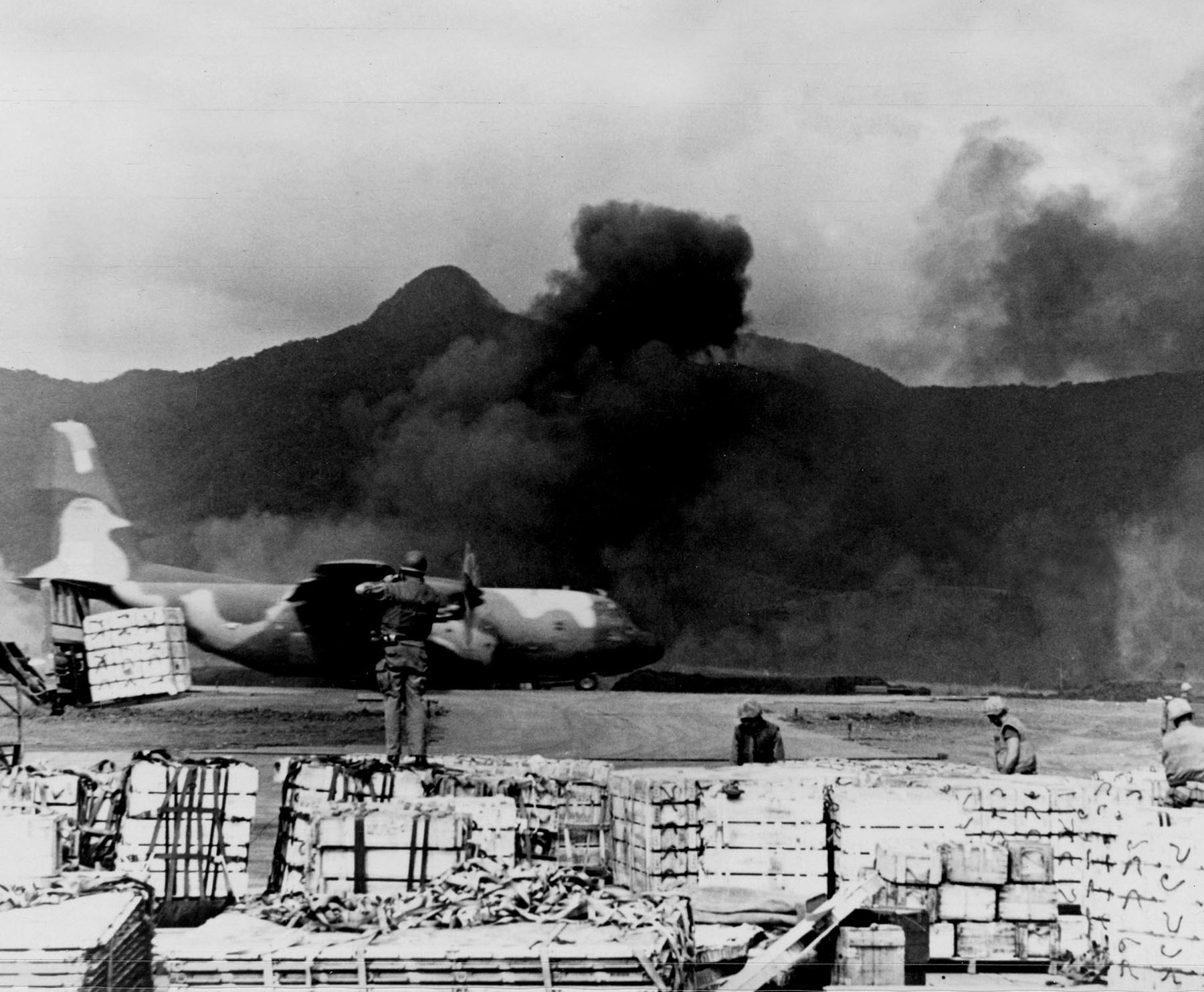
C-130 Hercules departing Khe Sanh 1968

In August 1967, the squadron became the 774th Tactical Airlift Squadron, and in July 1968, the 463d Wing moved from Mactan to Clark Air Base, Philippines. The "Green Weasels" continued supporting combat missions in Vietnam including Operation Delaware, A Sầu Valley and A Lưới Camp airdrop resupply. Tragically, a 774th TAS C-130B, #60-0297 was lost in the 1968 Kham Duc C-130 shootdown incident May 12, 1968, during the evacuation and Battle of Kham Duc. Everyone on board, including 150 Vietnamese civilians, one U.S. Special Forces officer, and 5 U.S. Air Force crewmen perished. At the time, it was the deadliest aircraft crash in history, it currently remains the deadliest aviation incident on Vietnamese soil. The 463d began reducing its operations in June 1971 (Note: The wing's 772d Tactical Airlift Squadron inactivated in June, and the 773d Tactical Airlift Squadron in October. Ravenstein, pp. 256-258.) and was inactivated at the end of the year. The 774th was reassigned to the Clark host 405th Fighter Wing, until inactivating in September 1972.

==== Dyess AFB Operations ====
On 1 August 1973, the squadron was reactivated at Dyess Air Force Base. The squadron deployed as a unit frequently to Europe, where it came under the operational control of the 513th Tactical Airlift Wing or the 313th Tactical Airlift Group in England or the 322d Tactical Airlift Wing or 435th Tactical Airlift Wing in Germany. The squadron flew humanitarian missions and participated in exercises. In October 1986, the squadron was inactivated.

=== Expeditionary Operations ===
A 774th EAS C-130H airdrops food and supplies via the Container Delivery System (CDS) method to a Forward Operating Base near Kandahar, Afghanistan 2012

The squadron was redesignated 774th Expeditionary Airlift Squadron, converted to provisional status in 2001, and assigned to Air Combat Command to activate or inactivate as needed. It has been activated twice to provide theater airlift for United States Central Command. The squadron was active in Kuwait from 2002 to 2003, activated again in Manas Air Base, Kyrgyzstan in 2004 and moved to Bagram Air Base, Afghanistan in January 2006. While based at Bagram AB, the 774th was composed of rotational C-130 Hercules crews and aircraft from active-duty, Reserve, and Air National Guard units supporting the War in Afghanistan (2001–2021) by performing combat tactical airlift resupply and airdrop missions throughout the region. The 774th EAS was inactivated on an unknown date prior to 2020–2021 U.S. troop withdrawal from Afghanistan.

== Lineage ==
- Constituted as the 774th Bombardment Squadron, Heavy on 19 May 1943

Activated on 1 August 1943
Inactivated, 25 Sep 1945

- Redesignated 774th Troop Carrier Squadron, Medium on 1 December 1952

Activated on 16 January 1953
Redesignated: 774th Troop Carrier Squadron on 15 May 1965
Redesignated: 774th Tactical Airlift Squadron on 1 August 1967
Inactivated on 15 September 1972

- Activated on 1 August 1973

Inactivated on 1 October 1986

- Redesignated 774th Expeditionary Airlift Squadron and converted to provisional status, on 4 December 2001
- Activated on 20 April 2002

Inactivated on 18 March 2003

- Activated on 4 October 2004

Inactivated on unknown date prior to 2020–2021 U.S. troop withdrawal from Afghanistan

=== Assignments ===
- 463d Bombardment Group, 1 August 1943 – 25 September 1945
- 463d Troop Carrier Group, 16 January 1953
- 463d Troop Carrier Wing (later 463d Tactical Airlift Wing), 25 September 1957 (attached to 315th Air Division, 21 March–19 June 1961, 322d Air Division, c. 15 March–20 July 1962, January–April 1964)
- 405th Fighter Wing, 31 December 1971 – 15 September 1972
- 463d Tactical Airlift Wing, 1 August 1973 – 1 October 1986 (attached to 322d Tactical Airlift Wing, 6 October–16 December 1973; 513th Tactical Airlift Wing, 3 September–16 November 1974, 3 May–7 July 1976; 435th Tactical Airlift Wing, 4 August–15 Oct 1975, 3 June–7 August 1977; 313th Tactical Airlift Group, 3 March–5 May 1978, 28 September–5 December 1979, 3 February–7 April 1981, 5 April–15 June 1982, 4 August–7 October 1983, 3 December 1984 – 9 February 1985, and 9 April–11 June 1986)
- Air Combat Command to activate or inactivate at any time after 4 December 2001

320th Expeditionary Operations Group, 20 April 2002 – 18 March 2003
376th Expeditionary Operations Group, 4 October 2004
455th Expeditionary Operations Group, 6 January 2006 – unknown

=== Stations ===
- Geiger Field, Washington, 1 August 1943
- Rapid City Army Air Base, South Dakota, August 1943
- MacDill Field, Florida, 4 November 1943
- Drane Field, Florida, 3 January 1944
- Camp Patrick Henry, Virginia, 3–12 February 1944
- Bari, Italy, 10 March 1944
- Celone Airfield, Italy, 15 March 1944 – 25 September 1945
- Memphis Municipal Airport, Tennessee, 16 January 1953
- Ardmore Air Force Base, Oklahoma, 17 August 1953
- Sewart Air Force Base, Tennessee, 15 November 1958 (deployed to Clark Air Base, Philippines, 21 March–19 June 1961, Évreux-Fauville Air Base, France, c. 15 March–20 July 1962)
- Langley Air Force Base, Virginia, 5 July 1963 – 15 November 1965 (deployed at Évreux-Fauville Air Base, France, January–April 1964)
- Mactan Island Airfield, Philippines, 23 November 1965
- Clark Air Base, Philippines, 15 July 1968 – 15 June 1971
- Dyess Air Force Base, Texas, 1 June 1972 – 1 October 1993

Deployed to Rhein Main Air Base, Germany, 6 October–16 December 1973, 4 August–15 October 1975, 3 June–7 August 1977; RAF Mildenhall, England, 3 September–16 November 1974, 3 May–7 July 1976, England, 3 March–5 May 1978, 28 September–5 December 1979, 3 February–7 April 1981, 5 April–15 June 1982, 4 August–7 October 1983, 3 December 1984 – 9 February 1985, 9 April–11 June 1986)

- Ali Al Salem Air Base, Kuwait, 20 April 2002 – 18 March 2003
- Manas Air Base, Kyrgyzstan, 4 October 2004
- Bagram Air Base, Afghanistan, 6 January 2006 – unknown

=== Aircraft ===
- Boeing B-17 Flying Fortress, 1943–1945
- Fairchild C-119 Flying Boxcar, 1953–1957
- Lockheed C-130 Hercules, 1956–1962; 1963–1971; 1972–1993; 2004–Unknown

=== Awards and campaigns ===
Award streamer	Award	Dates	Notes
	Distinguished Unit Citation	18 May 1944	Ploesti, Romania, 774th Bombardment Squadron
	Distinguished Unit Citation	24 March 1945	Berlin, Germany, 774th Bombardment Squadron
	Air Force Meritorious Unit Award	1 October 2005-1 September 2006	774th Expeditionary Airlift Squadron
	Air Force Meritorious Unit Award	1 October 2006-30 September 2007	774th Expeditionary Airlift Squadron
	Air Force Meritorious Unit Award	1 October 2007-30 September 2008	774th Expeditionary Airlift Squadron
	Air Force Meritorious Unit Award	1 October 2008-30 September 2009	774th Expeditionary Airlift Squadron
	Air Force Meritorious Unit Award	1 October 2009-30 September 2010	774th Expeditionary Airlift Squadron
	Air Force Meritorious Unit Award	1 October 2009-30 September 2010	774th Expeditionary Airlift Squadron
	Air Force Meritorious Unit Award	1 October 2010-30 September 2011	774th Expeditionary Airlift Squadron
	Air Force Meritorious Unit Award	1 October 2011-30 September 2012	774th Expeditionary Airlift Squadron
	Air Force Meritorious Unit Award	1 October 2012-30 September 2013	774th Expeditionary Airlift Squadron
	Air Force Meritorious Unit Award	1 July 2013-30 June 2014	774th Expeditionary Airlift Squadron
	Air Force Meritorious Unit Award	1 October 2014-30 September 2015	774th Expeditionary Airlift Squadron
	Air Force Meritorious Unit Award	1 October 2014-31 March 2017	774th Expeditionary Airlift Squadron
	Air Force Outstanding Unit Award with Combat "V" Device	1 January 1967-31 May 1968	774th Troop Carrier Squadron (later 774th Tactical Airlift Squadron)
	Air Force Outstanding Unit Award with Combat "V" Device	1 June 1968-30 June 1969	774th Tactical Airlift Squadron
	Air Force Outstanding Unit Award with Combat "V" Device	1 July 1970-31 May 1971	774th Tactical Airlift Squadron
	Air Force Outstanding Unit Award with Combat "V" Device	1 March 2002-31 May 2003	774th Expeditionary Airlift Squadron
	Air Force Outstanding Unit Award with Combat "V" Device	1 July 2004-31 May 2005	774th Expeditionary Airlift Squadron
	Air Force Outstanding Unit Award	15 December 1960-1 April 1961	774th Troop Carrier Squadron
	Air Force Outstanding Unit Award	1 July 1964-15 June 1966	774th Troop Carrier Squadron
	Air Force Outstanding Unit Award	1 May 1977-15 July 1978	774th Tactical Airlift Squadron
	Air Force Outstanding Unit Award	16 July 1978-30 June 1979	774th Tactical Airlift Squadron
	Vietnamese Gallantry Cross with Palm	1 January 1967-31 May 1971	774th Troop Carrier Squadron (later 774th Tactical Airlift Squadron)
	Philippine Republic Presidential Unit Citation	21 July-15 August 1972	774th Tactical Airlift Squadron

Campaign Streamer	Campaign	Dates	Notes
	Air Offensive, Europe	11 March 1944 – 5 June 1944	774th Bombardment Squadron
	Air Combat, EAME Theater	11 March 1944 – 11 May 1945	774th Bombardment Squadron
	Rome-Arno	11 March–9 September 1944	774th Bombardment Squadron
	Central Europe	22 March 1944 – 21 May 1945	774th Bombardment Squadron
	Normandy	6 June 1944 – 24 July 1944	774th Bombardment Squadron
	Northern France	25 July 1944 – 14 September 1944	774th Bombardment Squadron
	Southern France	15 August 1944 – 14 September 1944	774th Bombardment Squadron
	North Apennines	10 September 1944 – 4 April 1945	774th Bombardment Squadron
	Rhineland	15 September 1944 – 21 March 1945	774th Bombardment Squadron
	Po Valley	3 April 1945 – 8 May 1945	774th Bombardment Squadron
	Global War on Terror Expeditionary Medal		774th Expeditionary Airlift Squadron

== See also ==
- Boeing B-17 Flying Fortress Units of the Mediterranean Theater of Operations
- List of C-130 Hercules operators
