= 330th Troop Carrier Squadron =

330th Troop Carrier Squadron (later 330th Airlift Flight)
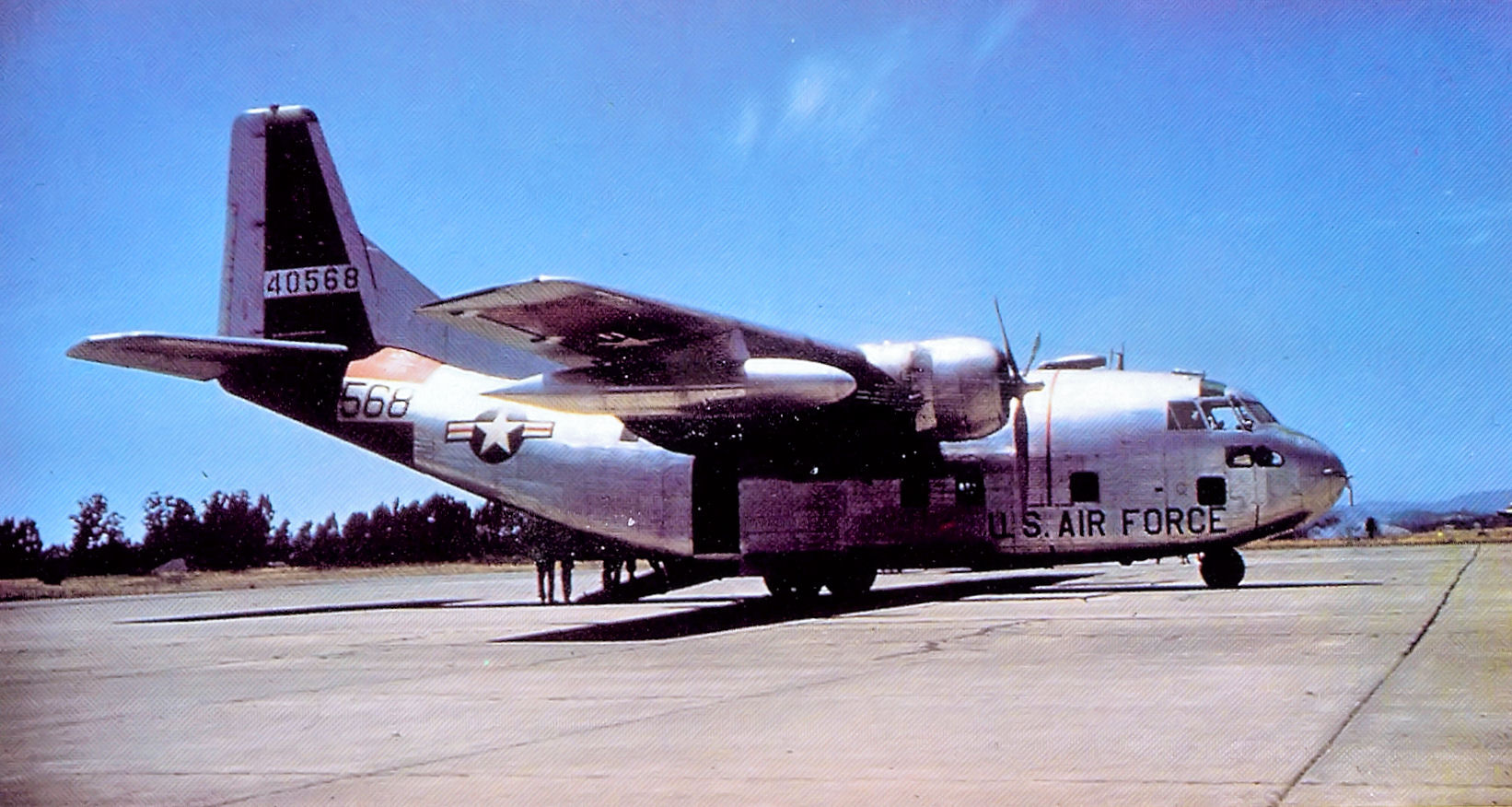
- C-123B Provider, last operational aircraft flown by the squadron (Note: Aircraft is Fairchild C-123B-4-FA Provider, serial 54-568.)
- Active: 1944–1946; 1948–1949; 1955–1958; 1993
- Country: United States
- Branch: United States Air Force
- Role: Airlift
- Engagements: China-Burma-India Theater
- Decorations: Air Force Outstanding Unit Award

Insignia
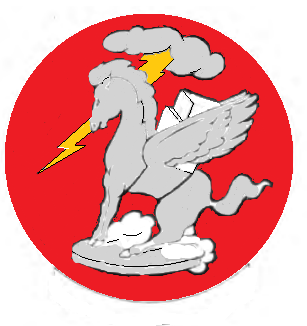
- 330 Troop Carrier Sq emblem (Note: Approved 27 June 1957. Description: On a red disc, superimposed over an Air Force yellow lightning flash issuing from a silver-gray cloud in chief and pointing to dexter a silver-gray Pegasus, wings upward, carrying on his back a stack of white boxes, and sliding to a halt on a dime, clouds of dust rising from his hoofs, all of the last [color]; outlines and details black throughout.)

The 330th Troop Carrier Squadron is an inactive United States Air Force unit, last active briefly as the 330th Airlift Flight, a personnel airlift unit, in 1993. The squadron was first activated in 1944 as the 9th Combat Cargo Squadron. The squadron was activated in India and served in combat in India and Burma. In October 1945, the squadron was redesignated the 330th Troop Carrier Squadron and moved to Shanghai, China, where it inactivated in April 1946.

The squadron was activated again in 1948 at Rhein-Main Air Base for the Berlin Airlift. Following the termination of the airlift, the squadron was inactivated. It was activated again in 1955 as an assault airlift unit, serving in that role until 1958. It was active for a few months in 1993 as the 330th Airlift Flight, transporting personnel.

== History ==
=== World War II ===
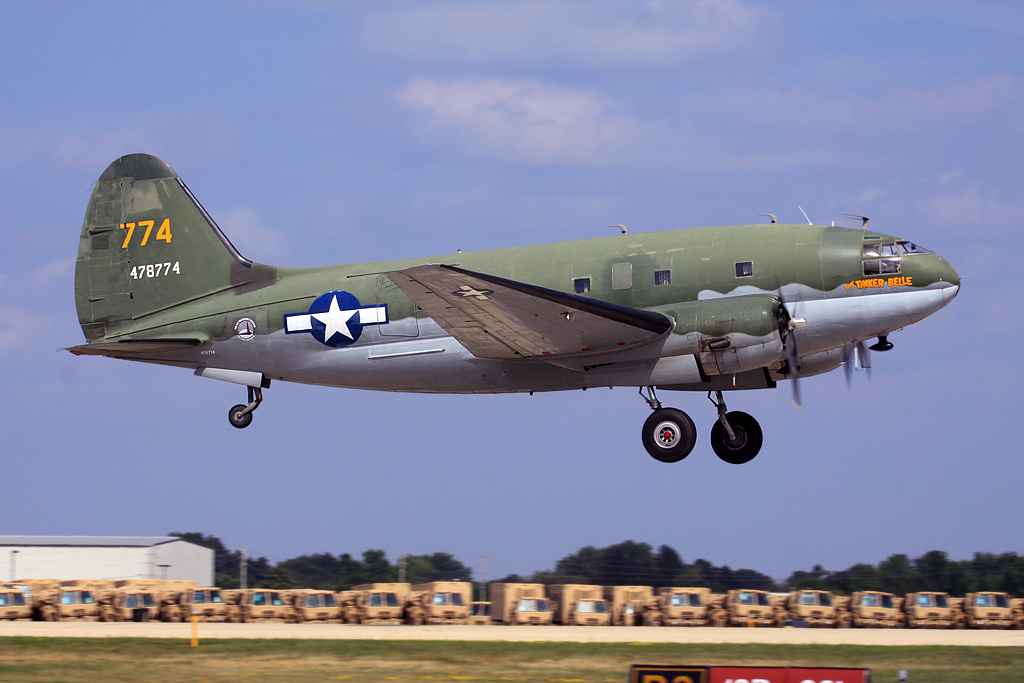
Restored C-46 Commando taking off

The squadron was activated in India along with other elements of the 3d Combat Cargo Group in June 1944. It was initially equipped with Douglas C-47 Skytrains available within the theater. It flew missions to support Allied ground forces during the battle for northern Burma and the subsequent drive to the south. It flew personnel and materiel to the front and transported gasoline, oil, vehicles and signal equipment, airdropping or landing them as conditions permitted. It also flew aeromedical evacuation missions on return flights to India.

In March 1945, the squadron replaced its C-47s with the more capable Curtiss C-46 Commando. Operating from Myitkyina Airfield, Burma after June 1945, it flew gasoline and other supplies to bases in western China, flying over The Hump. Following V-J Day, the squadron moved to Kiangwan Airfield, near Shanghai, China. At Shanghai it flew Chinese Nationalist troops to locations in China. It was inactivated there in April 1946, as the American presence in mainland China was reduced to a minimal force. Most of its aircraft were transferred to the Chinese Nationalist Air Force or Civil Air Transport.

=== Berlin Airlift ===
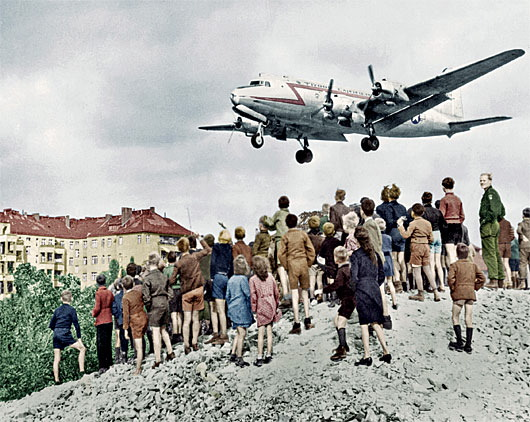
C-54 landing at Tempelhof 1948

Shortly after the beginning of the Berlin Airlift, the United States Air Force began to augment the C-47s that had been used at the beginning of the airlift with Douglas C-54 Skymasters. C-54s drawn from various Military Air Transport Service (MATS) units were formed into the 1422nd Air Transport Group (Provisional) at Rhein-Main Air Base, Germany on 1 August 1948. On 19 November 1948, the provisional group was replaced by the 513th Troop Carrier Group, and the 330th was reactivated as one of the group's squadrons. The squadron transported food, coal and other supplies to Berlin. Transport of coal posed particular problems, because it eroded equipment, increasing maintenance requirements to keep up the airlift's demanding schedule. Airlift operations officially ended on 30 September 1949. The end of the airlift coincided with President Truman's reduced 1949 defense budget, which required a reduction in the number of groups in the Air Force to 48. The squadron's C-54s were also needed elsewhere. While its planes were on loan for the airlift, MATS had only been able to meet 60% of its air transport obligations apart from the airlift. As a result, the 330th was inactivated on 16 October 1949.

=== Assault airlift operations ===
The squadron was reactivated at Sewart Air Force Base, Tennessee on 8 November 1955. On 8 October 1957, the 513th Troop Carrier Wing activated to replace the 513th Group. Until it could equip with Fairchild C-123 Provider, it temporarily flew Fairchild C-119 Flying Boxcars. The squadron continued to maintain proficiency in assault airlift operations and participated in exercises under Tactical Air Command until its personnel were withdrawn on 15 September 1958. Inactivation followed on 1 December.

=== Personnel transport ===
The squadron was reactivated in the spring of 1993 at McClellan Air Force Base, California, where it flew C-21 Learjets until inactivating on 1 October 1993

== Lineage ==
- Constituted as the 9th Combat Cargo Squadron on 1 June 1944 (Note: Maurer gives 1 "Jan" as the constitution date, but this is a typographical error. The squadron's sister units and group headquarters were all constituted on 1 June.)

Activated on 5 June 1944
Redesignated 330th Troop Carrier Squadron on 1 October 1945
Inactivated on 15 April 1946

- Redesignated 330th Troop Carrier Squadron, Special on 19 November 1948 and activated

Inactivated on 16 October 1949

- Redesignated 330th Troop Carrier Squadron, Assault, Fixed Wing on 30 June 1955

Activated on 8 November 1955
Redesignated 330th Troop Carrier Squadron, Assault on 1 July 1958
Inactivated on 1 December 1958

- Redesignated 330th Airlift Flight

Activated c. 31 May 1993
Inactivated 1 October 1993

=== Assignments ===
- 3d Combat Cargo Group (later 513th Troop Carrier Group), 5 June 1944 – 15 April 1946
- 513th Troop Carrier Group, 19 November 1948 – 16 October 1949
- 513th Troop Carrier Group, 18 November 1955
- 513th Troop Carrier Wing, 8 October 1957 – 1 December 1958
- 652d Air Base Group, c. 31 May 1993 – 1 October 1993

=== Stations ===
- Sylhet Airfield, Insia, 5 June 1944
- Moran Airfield, India, 12 July 1944
- Warazup Airfield, Burma, 27 December 1944
- Myitkyina Airfield, Burma, 3 June 1945
- Kiangwan Airfield, China, 7 October 1945 – 15 April 1946
- Rhein-Main Air Base, Germany, 19 November 1948 – 16 October 1949
- Sewart Air Force Base, Tennessee, 8 November 1955 – 1 December 1958
- McClellan Air Force Base, California, c. 31 May 1993 – 1 October 1993

=== Aircraft ===
- Douglas C-47 Skytrain, 1944-1945
- Curtiss C-46 Commando, 1945-1946
- Douglas C-54 Skymaster, 1948-1949
- Fairchild C-119 Flying Boxcar, 1955-1956
- Fairchild C-123 Provider, 1956-1958
- C-21 Learjet, 1993

=== Awards and campaigns ===
Award streamer	Award	Dates	Notes
	Air Force Outstanding Unit Award	19 August 1956–3 December 1956	330th Troop Carrier Squadron

Campaign Streamer	Campaign	Dates	Notes
	India-Burma	2 April 1943 – 28 January 1945	9th Combat Cargo Squadron
	Central Burma	29 January 1945 – 15 July 1945	9th Combat Cargo Squadron
	China Defensive	4 July 1942 – 4 May 1945	9th Combat Cargo Squadron
	China Offensive	5 May 1945 – 2 September 1945	9th Combat Cargo Squadron
	World War II Army of Occupation (Berlin Airlift)	3 December 1948 – 20 September 1949	330th Troop Carrier Squadron

== See also ==
- List of Douglas C-47 Skytrain operators
