= Sewart Air Force Base =

Former US Air Force base in Smyrna, Tennessee

Sewart Air Force Base Smyrna Army Air Field
- Part of Tactical Air Command (TAC)
- Smyrna, Tennessee
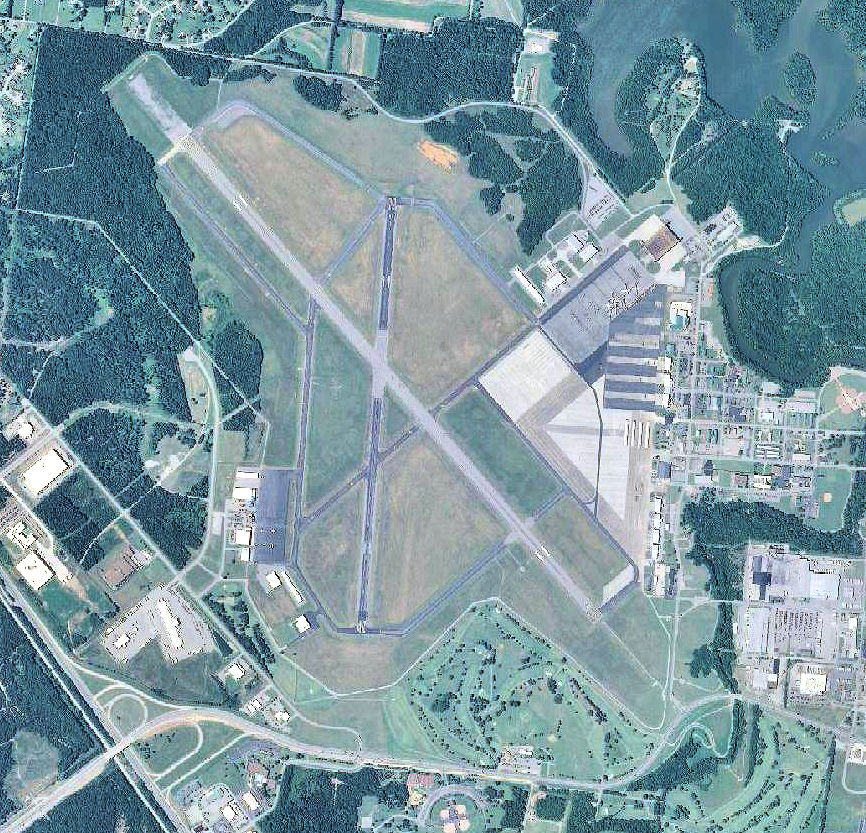
- 2006 USGS airphoto

Site information
- Type: Air Force Base
- Controlled by: United States Air Force

Location
- Location of Sewart Air Force Base, Tennessee
- Coordinates: 36°00′32″N 86°31′12″W

Site history
- Built: 1941
- In use: 1941–1971

Garrison information
- Garrison: Tactical Air Command
- Occupants: 64th Troop Carrier/Tactical Airlift Wing (1966–1971)

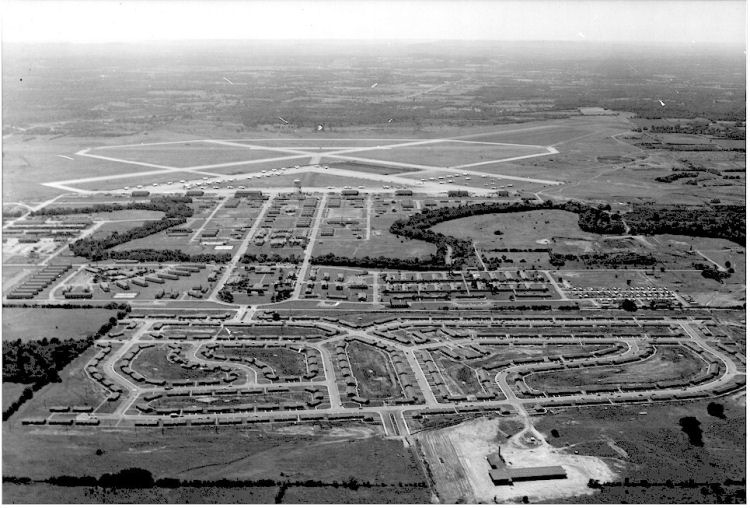
Smyrna Army Air Field – 1945

Sewart Air Force Base (1941–1971) is a former United States Air Force base located in Smyrna, about 25 miles southeast of Nashville, Tennessee. During World War II, it was known as Smyrna Army Air Field.

== History ==
=== World War II ===
The War Department ordered the construction of a Bombardment Air Base near Nashville on 22 December 1941, shortly after the US had entered World War II. A tract of land consisting of 3,325 acres (1,346 ha) located off US Route 70 in Rutherford County, Tennessee near Smyrna, Tennessee, was selected and acquired by the United States Army Air Forces for use as an Army-Air Force Training Command Base. Six thousand workers erected 200 buildings and an airfield to accommodate the training needs of the Army Air Force.

In January 1942, Smyrna Army Air Field was assigned to the AAF Southeast Training Center with the Army Air Force Pilot School (Specialized 4-Engine) activated (phase 3 pilot training). In this phase, cadets flew B-17 Flying Fortress and B-24 Liberator heavy bombers. Pilots graduating this phase were sent on to group combat training with the Second Air Force. Graduates were commissioned as Flight Officers (Warrant Officers), and those who graduated at the top of their class were commissioned as Second Lieutenants.

On 8 January 1943, the War Department constituted and activated the 76th Flying Training Wing (Specialized 4-Engine) at Smyrna and assigned it to the AAF Eastern Flying Training Command.

Throughout the war, numerous military personnel were stationed at Smyrna. At the end of hostilities, demobilization and defense reductions followed, resulting in the base being deactivated and placed in caretaker status in 1947. However, the installation's inactivity was short-lived and the newly created United States Air Force re-activated the facility as Smyrna Air Force Base in 1948.

=== 314th Troop Carrier Wing ===
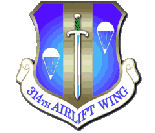

On 1 November 1948, the 314th Troop Carrier Wing (314 TCW) was formed at Smyrna AFB. The 314th Wing served as a primary troop carrier unit in the eastern United States, involved in joint airborne training with Army forces. Its personnel developed assault airlift operations and participated in aerial demonstrations, exercises, maneuvers, and joint operations.

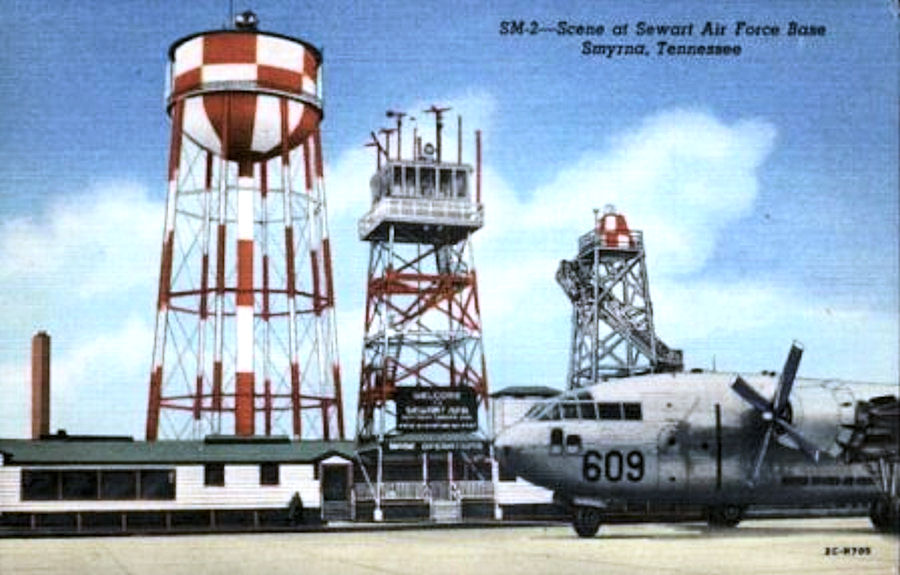
Sewart Air Force Base postcard from about 1950

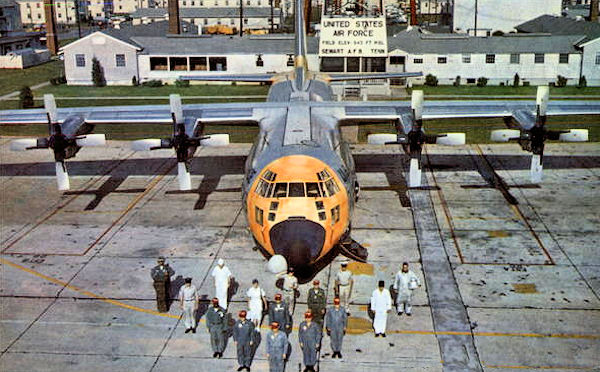
Postcard with personnel posed around new C-130 Hercules by Base Operations building. In the foreground are crew members such as pilot, co-pilot, navigator, flight engineer, scanner and loadmaster. Supporting personnel such as fire fighter, cook, nurse, weather observer, etc. form the balance of the troop carrier pyramid.

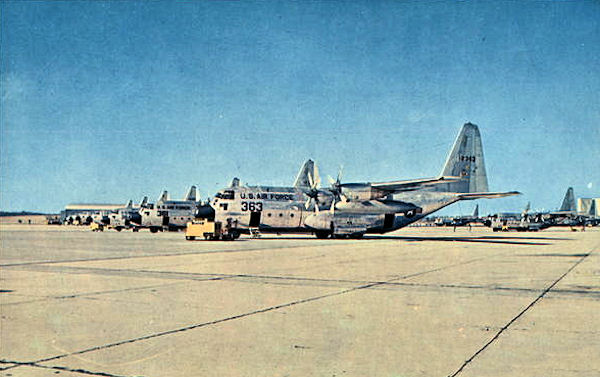
New C-130Es on parking ramp at Sewart

Transport Groups of the 314th:

- 309th Group: 26 June 1949 – 20 February 1951
- 314th Group: 1 November 1948 – 8 October 1957
- 316th Group: 4 November 1949 – 14 November 1954
- 313th Group: 1 October 1953 – 8 June 1955
- 513th Group: 8 November 1955 – 8 October 1957
- 516th Group: 8 March 1955 – 9 July 1956

Squadrons of the 314th:

- 50th Troop Carrier: 8 October 1957 – 26 December 1965
- 61st Troop Carrier: 8 October 1957 – 1 December 1965
- 62d Troop Carrier: 8 October 1957 – 1 December 1965
- 18th Troop Carrier: 1 July 1963 – 1 April 1965

Cargo aircraft used by the 314th:

- C-82, 1948–1951
- C-47, 1948–1953
- CG-15 Glider, 1949–1951
- C-119, 1949–1951
- C-45, 1949–1951, 1954–1955
- C-46, 1950, 1952
- C-123, 1956–1961
- C-130, 1956–1966

The 314th also hosted several helicopter squadrons:

- 20th Helicopter: 9 July 1956 – 17 July 1959
- 23d Helicopter: 9 July 1956 – 12 October 1956
- 24th Helicopter: 9 July 1956 – 25 September 1956
- 21st Helicopter: 30 June 1957 – 8 October 1957

These units flew the CH-21 Shawnee helicopter.

Smyrna AFB flourished in the late 1940s and 1950s. In the aftermath of World War II, the US military renamed several military establishments in honor of fallen heroes, and the Department of Defense chose to name the Smyrna base after native Tennessean Allan J. Sewart Jr. of Nashville. On 25 March 1950, Sewart Air Force Base was officially dedicated in honor of this hero who died in a bombing mission over the Solomon Islands in November 1942.

Sewart AFB was the only operational C-130 base in the United States in 1958.

On 7 January 1960, seven ski-equipped C-130 Hercules from Sewart's 61st Troop Carrier Squadron flew via California, Hawaii, Canton, Fiji and New Zealand to support Operation Deep Freeze ’60 in Antarctica, during the summer months on the frozen continent. The mission was to supply the U.S. National Science Foundation by landing at two bases at the South Pole and Marie Byrd Land. Lt. Colonel Wilbert Turk, commander of the 61st, led the mission.

Staging from Christchurch, New Zealand, the C-130s flew 7:40 hours to McMurdo Sound, Antarctica, on 23 January to establish a record-breaking time previously held by a U.S. Navy R7V Super Constellation. The 114 pilots and support crew were quartered ten miles (16 km) from the Ross Ice Shelf in order to be close to flight operations.

The use of the ski-equipped aircraft, which took place during twelve days in the final weeks of the summer support season, was called a significant advance in Antarctic explorations since the aircraft were the first to be able to physically land supplies at the front door of the scientific bases. Previously, supply was accomplished only by parachute by means of U.S. United States Air Force Globemaster aircraft, potentially losing or damaging the food, mail, building materials and delicate equipment. The C-130s carried extra wingtip tanks to extend the flight capability of up to 600 extra miles.

The 61st TCS returned to Sewart on 20 February after demonstrating that the ski-equipped C-130s could be successfully employed as ground-landing delivery systems. In subsequent years, Antarctic Development Squadron SIX (VXE-6) of the U.S. Navy took over support of the scientific stations by means of specially modified, ski-equipped LC-130F aircraft. Following the decommissioning of VXE-6, this mission was transferred to the 109th Airlift Wing of the New York Air National Guard which continues to perform polar support missions with the LC-130H aircraft to this day.

On 15 January 1966 the 314th Troop Carrier Wing was reassigned to Ching Chuan Kang Air Base (CCK), Taiwan to support the Vietnam War. The 314th also maintained a large detachment of C-130Es at Tuy Hoa Air Base, South Vietnam until 1970. A placeholder unit, the 4413th Troop Carrier Wing was established at Sewart with the wing's departure.

At Sewart, the 314th was awarded Air Force Outstanding Unit Awards for the periods of 11 January – 14 February 1955, and 1 January 1960 – 31 December 1961.

=== 463d Troop Carrier Wing ===
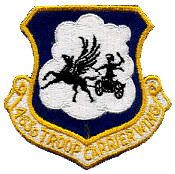

On 15 January 1959, the 463rd Troop Carrier Wing (463 TCW) moved to Sewart AFB, being transferred from the closing Ardmore Air Force Base, Oklahoma. Along with the 314th, the two wings made up the 839th Air Division (839 AD).

The 839 AD supported Tactical Air Command and US Strike Command deployments throughout the world, including back-to-back deployments to Lebanon and Taiwan in response to crisis situations on opposite sides of the world in the summer of 1958. 463d wing crews were involved in numerous operations around the globe until the 463rd transferred to Pacific Air Forces to support the Vietnam War.

C-130 squadrons of the 463d at Sewart:

- 772d Troop Carrier: 25 September 1957 – 30 June 1963
- 773d Troop Carrier:
- 774th Troop Carrier: 25 September 1957 – 30 June 1963

In the late 1950s and early 1960s, the 774th TCS also included "The Four Horsemen," a Tactical Air Command-sponsored C-130 flight demonstration team utilizing four C-130A aircraft.

During September 1961, the 463d supported the crisis in Berlin. Then, on 1 October 1962, the wing was redesignated as the 463rd Troop Carrier Wing (Assault). Immediately, the wing deployed to support the Cuban Missile Crisis (October–November 1962).

The wing moved to Langley AFB, Virginia, on 1 July 1963, later deploying to Mactan AB and Clark AB in the Philippines during 1965 to support the Vietnam War. A large detachment was established at Tan Son Nhut AB, South Vietnam, which flew transport missions until 31 December 1971 when the unit was deactivated.

At Sewart, the 463d was awarded the Air Force Outstanding Unit Award for the period 15 December 1960 – 1 April 1961.

=== 64th Troop Carrier/Tactical Airlift Wing ===
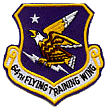

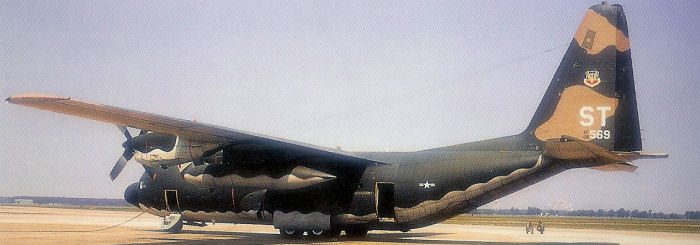
Lockheed C-130E-LM Hercules AF Serial No. 69-6569 of the 62nd Tactical Airlift Squadron, 20 May 1970. This aircraft was later converted to an AC-130E gunship, then upgraded to an AC-130H, named "Fatal Attraction".

With the departure of the 314th and 463d TCWs to PACAF, the 64th Troop Carrier Wing was activated at Sewart on 7 March 1966, replacing the 4413th. On 1 May 1967 the unit was re-designated as the 64th Tactical Airlift Wing.

The 64th initially performed global airlift and medical evacuation missions, including several deployments to South Vietnam and Thailand. However beginning in 1968, its primary mission was providing C-130 combat crew training for other units deploying to the Vietnam War.

C-130E squadrons of the 64th at Sewart:

- 61st Troop Carrier: 1 July 1966 – 31 May 1971 (Tail Code: SR), green band on the vertical stabilizer
- 62d Troop Carrier: 1 July 1966 – 31 May 1971 (Tail Code: ST), blue band on the vertical stabilizer

At Sewart, the 64th was awarded the Air Force Outstanding Unit Award with Combat "V" Device for the period 1 July 1966 – 30 June 1967 and (without "V" device) 1 June 1969 – 31 May 1971.

On 9 December 1965 the Department of Defense announced the closure of several military bases in the United States, including Sewart AFB. Closure activities continued for the next five years and on 9 March 1971, the last C-130 Hercules left one of the Sewart AFB runways. The 64th TAW was inactivated on 31 May 1971 and Sewart AFB was officially closed.

=== Redevelopment ===
When the base was deactivated it was transferred to a civilian operation. Ownership of the base was transferred to the Army Corps of Engineers and ultimately to the Smyrna/Rutherford County Airport Authority.

The bulk of the property vacated by the USAF was divided between three entities: 1) Rutherford County 2) State of Tennessee and 3) Metropolitan Nashville Airport Authority.

Rutherford County formed an Economic Development Committee composed of county commissioners, the county executive and the mayors of the municipalities. This group was instrumental in the conversion of the property obtained from the Department of Defense to private industrial use.

Some of the larger industries recruited included Capitol International Airways, Better Built Aluminum, Cumberland Swan, and Square D. During the 1970s many new jobs were created, and as a result, Smyrna's population nearly tripled between 1970 and 1980.

The property received by the State of Tennessee has been utilized by the Tennessee Rehabilitation Center. A portion of the base, including some hangar and aircraft ramp space, was retained by the Corps of Engineers and licensed for use by the Tennessee Army National Guard. The Army National Guard established an Army Aviation Support Facility, currently operating 60 helicopters crewed by approximately 300 full-time and 700 part-time military personnel, technically qualifying the airport as a joint civil-military airfield. Because of the Army National Guard presence, the airfield was also used as an Air National Guard outlying training field by C-130 Hercules aircraft of the former 118th Airlift Wing, now the 118th Wing, of the Tennessee Air National Guard at Nashville International Airport until 2012. It also continues to be used by C-17 Globemaster III aircraft of the 164th Airlift Wing of the Tennessee Air National Guard at Memphis International Airport.

The land granted to the Metropolitan Nashville Airport Authority included the runways, hangars, clear zones and related aviation facilities. The airport property was held for nearly 20 years with few improvements. In 1990, the Metropolitan Nashville Airport Authority agreed to relinquish control and transfer the airport to the newly formed Smyrna/Rutherford County Airport Authority.

== See also ==
- Tennessee World War II Army Airfields
- 76th Flying Training Wing (World War II)
