= 724th Strategic Missile Squadron =

United States Air Force military unit (1943–1965)

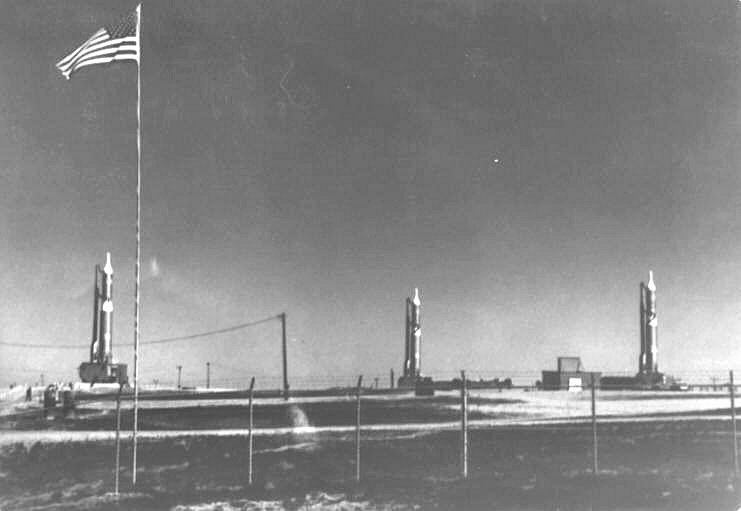
- Three Titan I missiles on alert at Watkins, Colorado about 1962
- Active: 1943–1945; 1961–1965
- Country: United States
- Branch: United States Air Force
- Role: Intercontinental ballistic missile
- Engagements: Mediterranean Theater of Operations
- Decorations: Distinguished Unit Citation; Air Force Outstanding Unit Award

Insignia
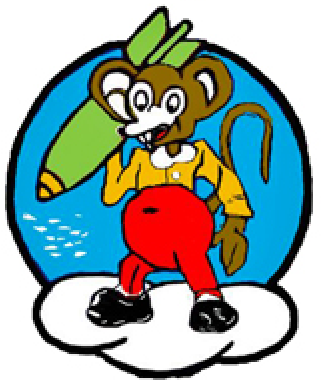
- 724th Bombardment Squadron emblem (World War II)

The 724th Strategic Missile Squadron is a United States Air Force unit inactivated on 25 June 1965. It was last assigned to the 451st Strategic Missile Wing at Lowry Air Force Base, Colorado.

The squadron was first activated during World War II in May 1943 as the 724th Bombardment Squadron. After training in the United States, it deployed to the Mediterranean Theater of Operations, where it participated in the strategic bombing campaign against Germany. The squadron earned three Distinguished Unit Citations for its actions during the war. Following V-E Day, the 724th returned to the United States and was inactivated. It was activated again as a missile unit in 1961, assuming the assets of another squadron.

== History ==
=== World War II ===
==== Organization and training in the United States ====
The squadron was first activated in May 1943 as the 724th Bombardment Squadron at Davis-Monthan Field, Arizona, as one of the four original squadrons of the 451st Bombardment Group. Although it was originally planned that the squadron would serve as an Operational Training Unit at Davis-Monthan; instead a cadre of the 451st Group moved to Dyersburg Army Air Base, Tennessee, where the 724th and other elements of the group were filled out by personnel drawn from the 346th Bombardment Group. The squadron commander, Captain James B. Beane, and a model crew joined other members of the group for advanced tactical training with the Army Air Forces School of Applied Tactics at Orlando Army Air Base, Florida. This cadre joined the remainder of the squadron at Wendover Field, Utah, for training with the Consolidated B-24 Liberator. The squadron continued its training at Fairmont Army Air Field, Nebraska, starting in September. The squadron suffered its first losses at Fairmont, when two squadron Liberators collided during a formation training flight, killing all but one crew member. On 18 November, the air echelon of the squadron departed Fairmont for staging at Lincoln Army Air Field, Nebraska, to ferry their aircraft via the Southern Ferrying Route to the Mediterranean Theater of Operations. The ground echelon left on 26 November for the port of embarkation at Camp Patrick Henry, Virginia, for transportation by ship.

==== Combat operations ====
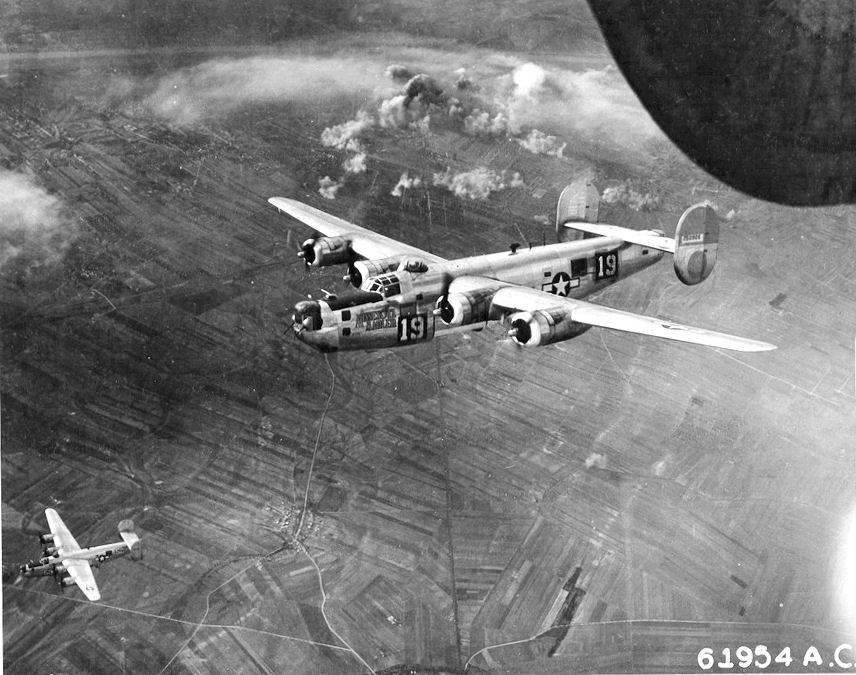
Squadron B-25J "Minnesota Mauler" (Note: Aircraft is Ford built Consolidated B-24J-5-FO Liberator, serial 42-50906. Minnesota Mauler. This aircraft crash landed at Zadar, Yugoslavia on 9 March 1945. Baugher, Joe (9 May 2023). "1942 USAF Serial Numbers". Joe Baugher.)

The squadron arrived at Gioia del Colle Airfield, Italy, at the beginning of January 1944, although the air echelon remained at Telergma Airfield, Algeria, until 20 January to conduct additional training. The squadron functioned primarily as a strategic bombing unit, attacking various targets including oil refineries, marshalling yards, aircraft factories and airfields in Italy, Germany, France, Czechoslovakia, Austria, Bulgaria, Hungary, Romania, Greece and Albania. It earned a Distinguished Unit Citation during Big Week for an attack on a Messerschmitt aircraft factory at Regensburg, Germany, on 25 February 1944. It added oak leaf clusters to this award for an attack on oil refineries and marshalling yards at Ploesti, Romania, on 5 April 1944 and on Markersdorf-Haindorf Airfield near Vienna, Austria, on 23 August 1944. On each of these missions the squadron was opposed by large numbers of German interceptor aircraft and heavy flak, but fought its way through to inflict serious damage on the targets and destroy many defending aircraft. Major Beane, the squadron commander, was shot down during the Ploesti mission. (Note: Major Beane was taken prisoner of war (POW). After the Red Army overran his POW camp in Romania, he returned to the group in the fall of 1944. History of the 451st Group, p. 18.)

When returning from the Regensburg attack, runway conditions at Gioia del Colle were so poor that the aircraft of the 451st Group were unable to land, but spread out among a number of bases in Italy. These poor conditions continued, and on 8 March the squadron moved to San Pancrazio Airfield, Italy. The 451st Group's 726th Bombardment Squadron was also relocated there.

On 6 April, the 724th moved to Castelluccio Airfield, where it joined the remainder of the group. From its new base, the squadron also flew air support and interdiction missions. It undertook preliminary operations in preparation for Operation Dragoon, the invasion of southern France, in August 1944. The following month its bombers transported supplies to forces operating in Italy, It also supported Operation Grapeshot, the final advance of Allied armies in northern Italy. The squadron's last mission was flown on 26 April 1945 against marshalling yards at Sachsenburg, Austria.

The squadron left Italy in June 1945, with the air echelon ferrying their planes, while most of the ground echelon sailed on the USS General M. C. Meigs to Newport News, Virginia. The squadron assembled later in the month at Dow Field, Maine, where it was inactivated on 26 September 1945. Personnel who were not discharged from the service on return to the United States were transferred to Air Transport Command units at Dow.

=== Strategic Air Command ===
Strategic Air Command (SAC)'s first HGM-25A Titan I wing, the 703d Strategic Missile Wing was located at Lowry Air Force Base, Colorado. SAC decided to replace the 703d Wing with the 451st Strategic Missile Wing. As part of this change, the squadron was redesignated the 724th Strategic Missile Squadron and organized on 1 July 1961 to replace the 848th Strategic Missile Squadron, which was simultaneously inactivated. The 724th absorbed the 848th's mission personnel and missiles. On 6 October, the squadron's first Titan I missile was placed in its silo.

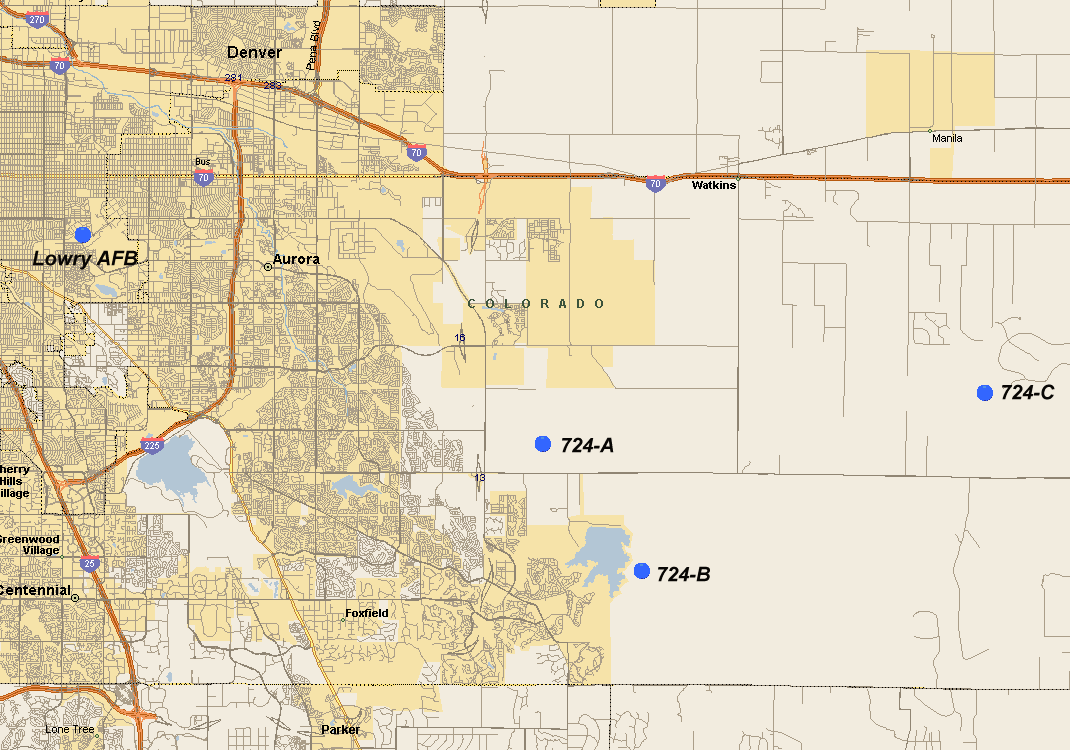
HGM-25A Titan I missile sites

The squadron was deployed in a "3x3" configuration: its nine missiles were divided into three sites, each with three intercontinental ballistic missiles:

724-A, 8 miles SSW of Watkins, Colorado 39°38′55″N 104°41′27″W
724-B, 10 miles SSW of Watkins, Colorado39°36′17″N 104°34′50″W
724-C, 8 miles SE of Watkins, Colorado 39°39′57″N 104°29′38″W

The squadron was declared operational on 18 April 1962, and on 20 April 1962 it was the first to place a Titan I missile on alert status. On 19 November 1964, Defense Secretary Robert McNamara announced the phase-out of the remaining first-generation SM-65 Atlas and Titan I missiles by the end of June 1965. Consequently, the Titan Is of the 724th began to be removed from alert status on 17 February 1965. The Air Force subsequently inactivated the squadron on 25 June.

== Lineage ==
- Constituted as the 724th Bombardment Squadron (Heavy) on 6 April 1943

Activated on 1 May 1943
Redesignated 724th Bombardment Squadron, Heavy on 10 May 1943
Inactivated on 26 September 1945

- Redesignated 724th Strategic Missile Squadron (ICBM-Titan) and activated on 26 April 1961 (not organized)

Organized on 1 July 1961
Inactivated on 25 June 1965

=== Assignments ===
- 451st Bombardment Group, 1 May 1943 – 26 September 1945
- Strategic Air Command, 26 April 1961 (not organized)
- 451st Strategic Missile Wing, 1 July 1961 – 25 June 1965

=== Stations ===
- Davis-Monthan Field, Arizona, 1 May 1943
- Dyersburg Army Air Base, Tennessee, 4 June 1943
- Wendover Field, Utah, c. 19 July 1943
- Fairmont Army Air Field, Nebraska, 8 September – 26 November 1943
- Gioia del Colle Airfield, Italy, 2 January 1944
- San Pancrazio Airfield, Italy 8 March 1944
- Castelluccio Airfield, Italy c. 6 April 1944 – c. 4 June 1945
- Dow Field, Maine, 18 June – 26 September 1945
- Lowry Air Force Base, Colorado, 26 April 1961 – 25 June 1965

=== Aircraft and missiles ===
- Consolidated B-24 Liberator, 1943–1945
- HGM-25A Titan I, 1961–1965

=== Awards and campaigns ===
Award streamer	Award	Dates	Notes
	Distinguished Unit Citation	25 February 1944	Regensburg, Germany 724th Bombardment Squadron
	Distinguished Unit Citation	5 April 1944	Ploesti, Romania 724th Bombardment Squadron
	Distinguished Unit Citation	23 August 1944	Austria 724th Bombardment Squadron
	Air Force Outstanding Unit Award	1 July 1963-30 June 1964	724th Strategic Missile Squadron

Campaign Streamer	Campaign	Dates	Notes
	Air Offensive, Europe	2 January 1944 – 5 June 1944	724th Bombardment Squadron
	Air Combat, EAME Theater	2 January 1944 – 11 May 1945	724th Bombardment Squadron
	Naples-Foggia	2 January 1944 – 21 January 1944	724th Bombardment Squadron
	Anzio	22 January 1944 – 24 May 1944	724th Bombardment Squadron
	Rome-Arno	22 January 1944 – 9 September 1944	724th Bombardment Squadron
	Normandy	6 June 1944 – 24 July 1944	724th Bombardment Squadron
	Northern France	25 July 1944 – 14 September 1944	724th Bombardment Squadron
	Southern France	15 August 1944 – 14 September 1944	724th Bombardment Squadron
	North Apennines	10 September 1944 – 4 April 1945	724th Bombardment Squadron
	Rhineland	15 September 1944 – 21 March 1945	724th Bombardment Squadron
	Ardennes-Alsace	16 December 1944 – 25 January 1945	724th Bombardment Squadron
	Central Europe	22 March 1944 – 21 May 1945	724th Bombardment Squadron
	Po Valley	3 April 1945 – 8 May 1945	724th Bombardment Squadron

== See also ==
- List of United States Air Force missile squadrons
- B-24 Liberator units of the United States Army Air Forces
