= 725th Strategic Missile Squadron =

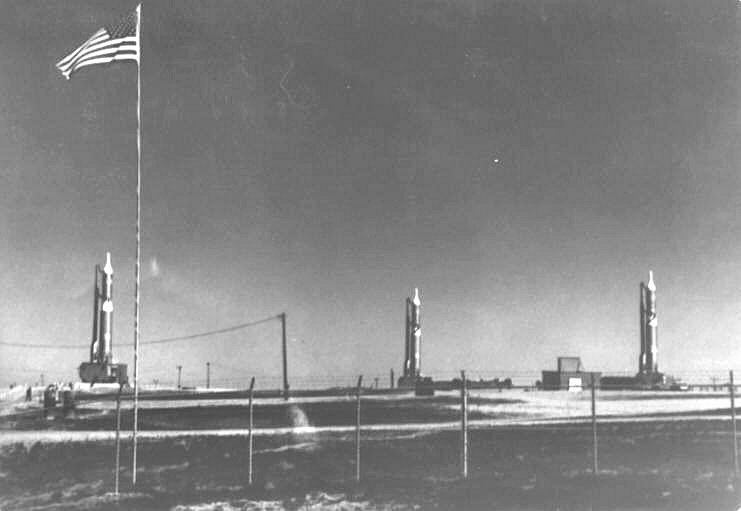
- Three 451st Strategic Missile Wing Titan I missiles on alert about 1962
- Active: 1943–1945; 1961–1965
- Country: United States
- Branch: United States Air Force
- Role: Intercontinental ballistic missile
- Motto: Semper Liberatus (Latin for 'Always Free')
- Engagements: Mediterranean Theater of Operations
- Decorations: Distinguished Unit Citation; Air Force Outstanding Unit Award

Insignia
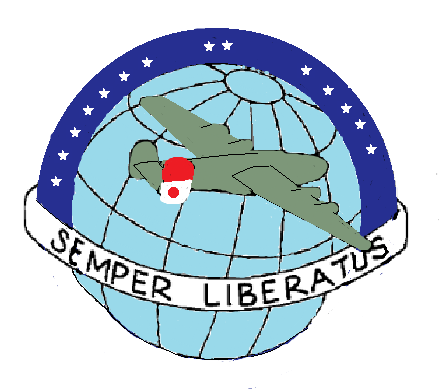
- 725th Bombardment Squadron emblem (World War II)

The 725th Strategic Missile Squadron is an inactive United States Air Force unit. It was last assigned to the 451st Strategic Missile Wing at Lowry Air Force Base, Colorado, where it was inactivated on 25 June 1965.

The squadron was first activated in May 1943 as the 725th Bombardment Squadron. After training in the United States, it deployed to the Mediterranean Theater of Operations, where it participated in the strategic bombing campaign against Germany. The squadron earned three Distinguished Unit Citations for its actions during the war. Following V-E Day, the 725th returned to the United States and was inactivated. It was activated again as a missile unit in 1961, when it assumed the assets of another squadron.

== History ==
=== World War II ===
==== Organization and training in the United States ====
The squadron was first activated in May 1943 as the 725th Bombardment Squadron at Davis-Monthan Field, Arizona. It was one of the four original squadrons of the 451st Bombardment Group. Although original plans were for the squadron to be an Operational Training Unit at Davis-Monthan, instead a cadre of the 451st Group moved to Dyersburg Army Air Base, Tennessee, where the 725th and other elements of the group were filled out by personnel drawn from the 346th Bombardment Group. The squadron commander, Capt John P. Davis, and a model crew joined other members of the group for advanced tactical training with the Army Air Forces School of Applied Tactics at Orlando Army Air Base, Florida. This cadre joined the remainder of the squadron at Wendover Field, Utah for training with the Consolidated B-24 Liberator. The squadron continued its training at Fairmont Army Air Field, Nebraska, starting in September. On 18 November, the air echelon of the squadron departed Fairmont for staging at Lincoln Army Air Field, Nebraska to ferry their aircraft via the South Atlantic air ferry route to the Mediterranean Theater of Operations. The ground echelon left on 26 November for the port of embarkation at Camp Patrick Henry, Virginia for transportation by ship.

==== Combat operations ====
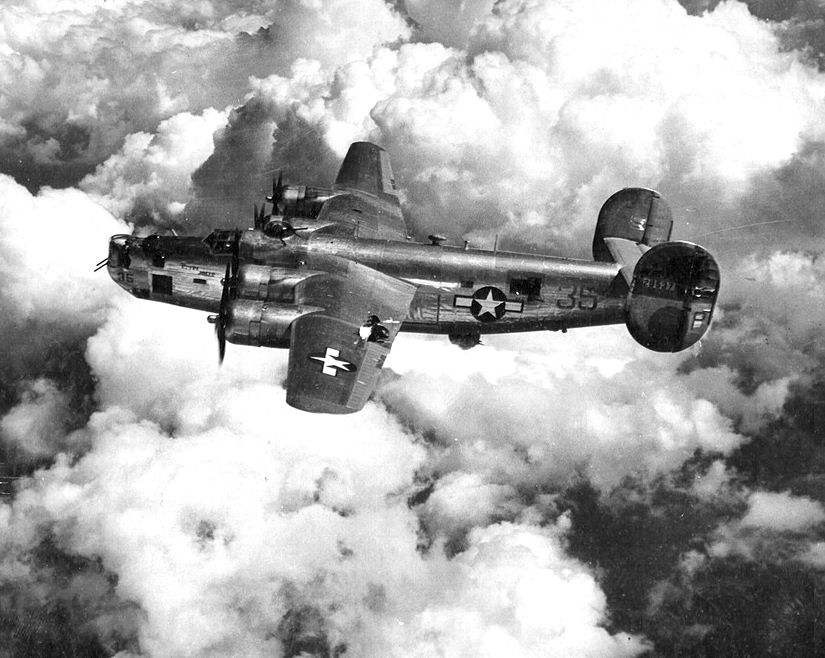
745th Squadron B-24H Liberator (Note: Aircraft is Ford Motors built Consolidated B-24H-30-FO Liberator, serial 42-95379, Extra Joker. This aircraft is pictured just moments before it burst into flames and went out of control. All ten crew members were killed in action. It was attacked by Focke-Wulf Fw 190s over Turnitz, Austria on 23 August 1944. One can see the fire that had just started on the left wing behind the No. 1 engine. Baugher, Joe (2 June 2023). "1942 USAF Serial Numbers". Joe Baugher. Missing Air Crew Report 7956.)

The squadron arrived at Gioia del Colle Airfield, Italy at the beginning of January 1944, although the air echelon remained at Telergma Airfield, Algeria until 20 January to conduct additional training. The squadron functioned primarily as a strategic bombing unit, attacking targets like oil refineries, marshalling yards, aircraft factories and airfields in Italy, Germany, France, Czechoslovakia, Austria, Bulgaria, Hungary, Romania, Greece and Albania. It earned a Distinguished Unit Citation during Big Week for an attack on a Messerschmitt aircraft factory at Regensburg, Germany on 25 February 1944. It added oak leaf clusters to this award for an attack on oil refineries and marshalling yards at Ploesti, Romania on 5 April 1944 and on Markersdorf-Haindorf Airfield near Vienna, Austria on 23 August 1944. On each of these missions the squadron was opposed by large numbers of enemy interceptor aircraft and heavy flak, but fought its way through to inflict serious damage on the targets and destroy many enemy aircraft.

When returning from the Regensburg attack, runway conditions at Gioia del Colle were so poor that the aircraft of the 451st Group were unable to land there. Instead, the group's squadrons spread out among a number of bases in Italy. These poor conditions continued and on 8 March the squadron moved to Manduria Airfield, Italy. The 451st Group's 727th Bombardment Squadron was also relocated there

On 6 April, the 725th moved to Castelluccio Airfield, where it joined the remainder of the group. From its new base, the squadron also flew air support and interdiction missions. It helped prepare the way for Operation Dragoon, the invasion of southern France in August 1944. The following month its bombers transported supplies to forces operating in Italy, It also supported Operation Grapeshot the final advance of Allied armies in northern Italy. The squadron's last mission was flown on 26 April 1945 against marshalling yards at Sachsenburg, Austria.

The squadron left Italy in June 1945, with the air echelon ferrying their planes, while most of the ground echelon sailed on the USS General M. C. Meigs to Newport News, Virginia. The squadron assembled later in the month at Dow Field, Maine, where it was inactivated on 26 September 1945. Personnel that were not discharged from the service on return to the United States were transferred to Air Transport Command units at Dow.

=== Strategic Air Command ===
Strategic Air Command (SAC)'s first HGM-25A Titan I wing, the 703d Strategic Missile Wing was located at Lowry Air Force Base, Colorado. SAC decided to replace the 703d Wing with the 451st Strategic Missile Wing. As part of this change, the squadron was redesignated the 725th Strategic Missile Squadron and organized on 1 July 1961 to replace the 849th Strategic Missile Squadron, which was simultaneously inactivated. The 725th absorbed the 849th's mission, personnel and missiles.

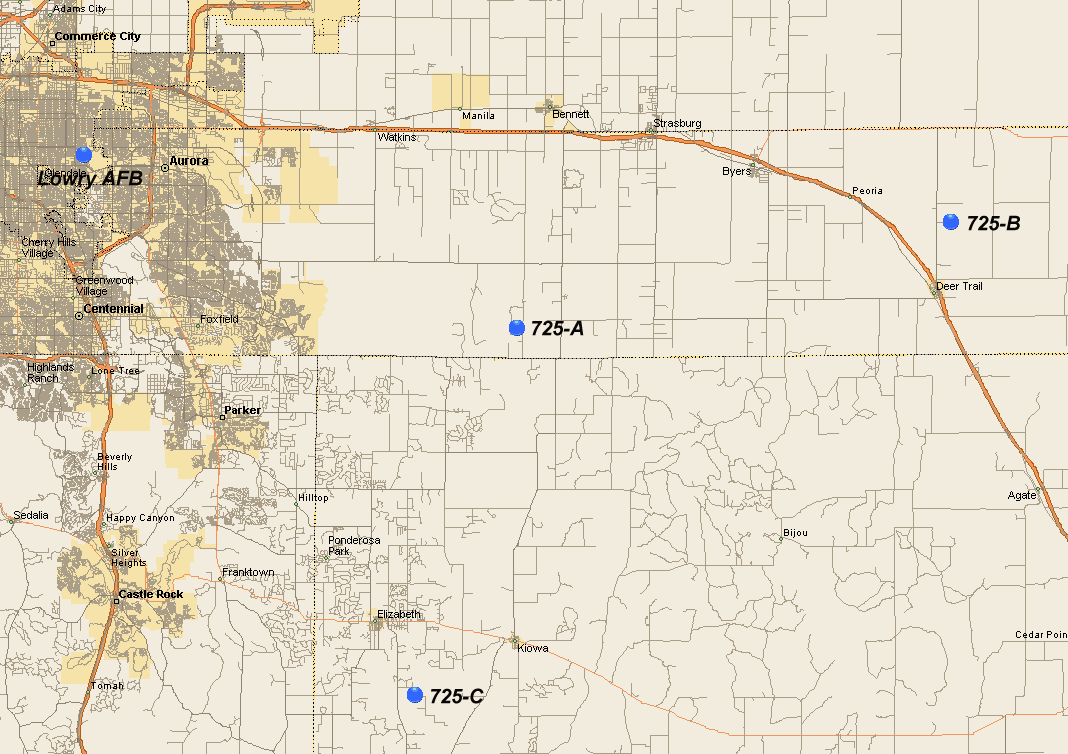
HGM-25A Titan I missile sites

the squadron was deployed in a "3x3" configuration, which meant its nine missiles were divided into three sites. Each had three intercontinental ballistic missiles. The squadron missile sites were:

725-A, 14 miles SE of Watkins, Colorado 39°35′15″N 104°27′42″W
725-B, 4 miles NNE of Deer Trail, Colorado39°40′06″N 104°01′41″W
725-C, 5 miles SSE of Elisabeth, Colorado 39°18′54″N 104°33′43″W

On 19 November 1964, Defense Secretary Robert McNamara announced the phase-out of the remaining first-generation SM-65 Atlas and Titan I missiles by the end of June 1965. Consequently, the Titan Is of the 725th were removed from alert status and the squadron shipped the Air Force's last strategic Titan I missile out on 15 April. The Air Force subsequently inactivated the squadron on 25 June.

== Lineage ==
- Constituted as the 725th Bombardment Squadron (Heavy) on 6 April 1943

Activated on 1 May 1943
Redesignated 725th Bombardment Squadron, Heavy on 10 May 1943
Inactivated on 26 September 1945

- Redesignated 725th Strategic Missile Squadron (ICBM-Titan) and activated on 26 April 1961 (not organized)

Organized on 1 July 1961
Inactivated on 25 June 1965

=== Assignments ===
- 451st Bombardment Group, 1 May 1943 – 26 September 1945
- Strategic Air Command, 26 April 1961 (not organized)
- 451st Strategic Missile Wing, 1 July 1961 – 25 June 1965

=== Stations ===
- Davis-Monthan Field, Arizona, 1 May 1943
- Dyersburg Army Air Base, Tennessee, 4 June 1943
- Wendover Field, Utah, c. 19 July 1943
- Fairmont Army Air Field, Nebraska, 8 September–26 November 1943
- Gioia del Colle Airfield, Italy, 2 January 1944
- Maduria Airfield, Italy 8 March 1944
- Castelluccio Airfield, Italy c. 6 April 1944 – c. 4 June 1945
- Dow Field, Maine, 18 June–26 September 1945
- Lowry Air Force Base, Colorado, 26 April 1961 – 25 June 1965

=== Aircraft and missiles ===
- Consolidated B-24 Liberator, 1943–1945
- HGM-25A Titan I, 1961–1965

=== Awards and campaigns ===
Award streamer	Award	Dates	Notes
	Distinguished Unit Citation	25 February 1944	Regensburg, Germany 725th Bombardment Squadron
	Distinguished Unit Citation	5 April 1944	Ploesti, Romania 725th Bombardment Squadron
	Distinguished Unit Citation	23 August 1944	Austria 725th Bombardment Squadron
	Air Force Outstanding Unit Award	1 July 1963-30 June 1964	725th Strategic Missile Squadron

Campaign Streamer	Campaign	Dates	Notes
	Air Offensive, Europe	2 January 1944 – 5 June 1944	725th Bombardment Squadron
	Air Combat, EAME Theater	2 January 1944 – 11 May 1945	725th Bombardment Squadron
	Naples-Foggia	2 January 1944 – 21 January 1944	725th Bombardment Squadron
	Anzio	22 January 1944 – 24 May 1944	725th Bombardment Squadron
	Rome-Arno	22 January 1944 – 9 September 1944	725th Bombardment Squadron
	Normandy	6 June 1944 – 24 July 1944	725th Bombardment Squadron
	Northern France	25 July 1944 – 14 September 1944	725th Bombardment Squadron
	Southern France	15 August 1944 – 14 September 1944	725th Bombardment Squadron
	North Apennines	10 September 1944 – 4 April 1945	725th Bombardment Squadron
	Rhineland	15 September 1944 – 21 March 1945	725th Bombardment Squadron
	Ardennes-Alsace	16 December 1944 – 25 January 1945	725th Bombardment Squadron
	Central Europe	22 March 1944 – 21 May 1945	725th Bombardment Squadron
	Po Valley	3 April 1945 – 8 May 1945	725th Bombardment Squadron

== See also ==
- List of United States Air Force missile squadrons
- B-24 Liberator units of the United States Army Air Forces
