= 727th Bombardment Squadron =

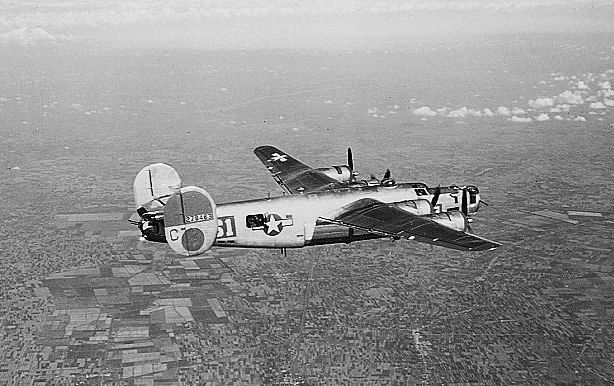
- B-24 Liberator of the 451st Bombardment Group
- Active: 1943-1945
- Country: United States
- Branch: United States Air Force
- Role: Heavy bomber
- Engagements: Mediterranean Theater of Operations
- Decorations: Distinguished Unit Citation

Insignia
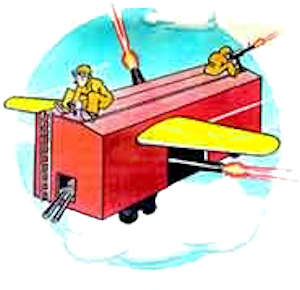
- 727 Bombardment Sq emblem (Note: Approved 29 August 1944. Description: Over and through a light turquoise blue disc, a large red boxcar winged yellow, in flight, having cannon and machine guns issuing from all doors, steered by a small caricatured pilot in tan flight suit, and having a rear gunner dressed in a like manner firing machine gun on mount at rear, over a large white cloud formation in base and between like cloud formations in chief and dexter fess, all emitting white speed lines to rear.)

The 727th Bombardment Squadron is a former United States Army Air Forces unit. It was last assigned to the 451st Bombardment Group at Dow Field, Maine, where it was inactivated on 26 September 1945. The squadron was activated during World War II as one of the original squadrons of the 451st Bombardment Group. After training in the United States, it served in the Mediterranean Theater of Operations, where it participated in the strategic bombing campaign against Germany. It earned three Distinguished Unit Citations for its combat actions. After VE Day the squadron returned to the United States, where it was inactivated.

== History ==
=== Organization and training in the United States ===
The squadron was first activated at Davis-Monthan Field, Arizona as one of the four original squadrons of the 451st Bombardment Group. Although original plans were for the squadron to be an Operational Training Unit at Davis-Monthan, instead a cadre of the 451st Group moved to Dyersburg Army Air Base, Tennessee, where the 727th and other elements of the group were filled out by personnel drawn from the 346th Bombardment Group. The squadron commander, Capt Clayton E.Evans, and a model crew joined other members of the group for advanced tactical training with the Army Air Forces School of Applied Tactics at Orlando Army Air Base, Florida. This cadre joined the remainder of the squadron at Wendover Field, Utah for training with the Consolidated B-24 Liberator. The squadron continued its training at Fairmont Army Air Field, Nebraska, starting in September. On 18 November, the air echelon of the squadron departed Fairmont for staging at Lincoln Army Air Field, Nebraska to ferry their aircraft via the Southern Ferrying Route to the Mediterranean Theater of Operations. The ground echelon left on 26 November for the port of embarkation at Camp Patrick Henry, Virginia, for transportation by ship.

=== Combat operations ===
The squadron arrived at Gioia del Colle Airfield, Italy at the beginning of January, although the air echelon remained at Telergma Airfield, Algeria until 20 January to conduct additional training. The squadron functioned primarily as a strategic bombing unit, attacking targets like oil refineries, marshalling yards, aircraft factories and airfields in Italy, Germany, France, Czechoslovakia, Austria, Bulgaria, Hungary, Romania, Greece and Albania. It earned a Distinguished Unit Citation during Big Week for an attack on a Messerschmitt aircraft factory at Regensburg, Germany on 25 February 1944. It added oak leaf clusters to this award for an attack on oil refineries and marshalling yards at Ploesti, Romania on 5 April 1944 and on Markersdorf-Haindorf Airfield near Vienna, Austria on 23 August 1944. On each of these missions the squadron was opposed by large numbers of enemy interceptor aircraft and heavy flak, but fought its way through to inflict serious damage on the targets and destroy many enemy aircraft.

When returning from the Regensburg attack, runway conditions at Gioia del Colle were so poor that the aircraft of the 451st Group were unable to land there, but spread out among a number of bases in Italy. These poor conditions continued and on 8 March the squadron moved to Manduria Airfield, Italy. The 451st Group's 725th Bombardment Squadron was also relocated there

On 6 April, the 727th moved to Castelluccio Airfield, where it joined the remainder of the group. From its new base, the squadron also flew air support and interdiction missions. It helped prepare the way for Operation Dragoon, the invasion of southern France in August 1944. The following month its bombers transported supplies to forces operating in Italy, It also supported Operation Grapeshot the final advance of Allied armies in northern Italy. The squadron's last mission was flown on 26 April 1945 against marshalling yards at Sachsenburg, Austria.

The squadron left Italy in June 1945. The air echelon ferried their planes back to the United States, while most of the ground echelon sailed on the USS General M. C. Meigs to Newport News, Virginia. The squadron assembled later in the month at Dow Field, Maine, where it was inactivated on 26 September 1945. Unit personnel that were not discharged from the service on return to the United States were transferred to Air Transport Command units at Dow.

== Lineage ==
- Constituted as the 727th Bombardment Squadron (Heavy) on 6 April 1943

Activated on 1 May 1943
Redesignated 727th Bombardment Squadron, Heavy on 10 May 1943
Inactivated on 26 September 1945

=== Assignments ===
- 451st Bombardment Group, 1 May 1943-26 Sep 1945

=== Stations ===
- Davis-Monthan Field, Arizona, 1 May 1943
- Dyersburg Army Air Base, Tennessee, 4 June 1943
- Wendover Field, Utah, c. 19 July 1943
- Fairmont Army Air Field, Nebraska, c. 11 September – 16 November 1943
- Gioia del Colle Airfield, Italy, 2 January 1944
- Manduria Airfield, Italy, 8 March 1944
- Castelluccio Airfield, Italy, c. 6 April 1944 – 4 June 1945
- Dow Field, Maine, 18 June – 16 September 1945

=== Aircraft ===
- Consolidated B-24 Liberator, 1943–1945

=== Awards and campaigns ===
Award streamer	Award	Dates	Notes
	Distinguished Unit Citation	25 February 1944	Regensburg, Germany
	Distinguished Unit Citation	5 April 1944	Ploesti, Romania
	Distinguished Unit Citation	23 August 1944	Austria

Campaign Streamer	Campaign	Dates	Notes
	Air Offensive, Europe	2 January 1944–5 June 1944	
	Air Combat, EAME Theater	2 January 1944–11 May 1945	
	Naples-Foggia	2 January 1944–21 January 1944	
	Anzio	22 January 1944–24 May 1944	
	Rome-Arno	22 January 1944–9 September 1944	
	Normandy	6 June 1944–24 July 1944	
	Northern France	25 July 1944–14 September 1944	
	Southern France	15 August 1944–14 September 1944	
	North Apennines	10 September 1944–4 April 1945	
	Rhineland	15 September 1944–21 March 1945	
	Ardennes-Alsace	16 December 1944–25 January 1945	
	Central Europe	22 March 1944–21 May 1945	
	Po Valley	3 April 1945–8 May 1945	

== See also ==
- B-24 Liberator units of the United States Army Air Forces
