= 451st Air Expeditionary Group =

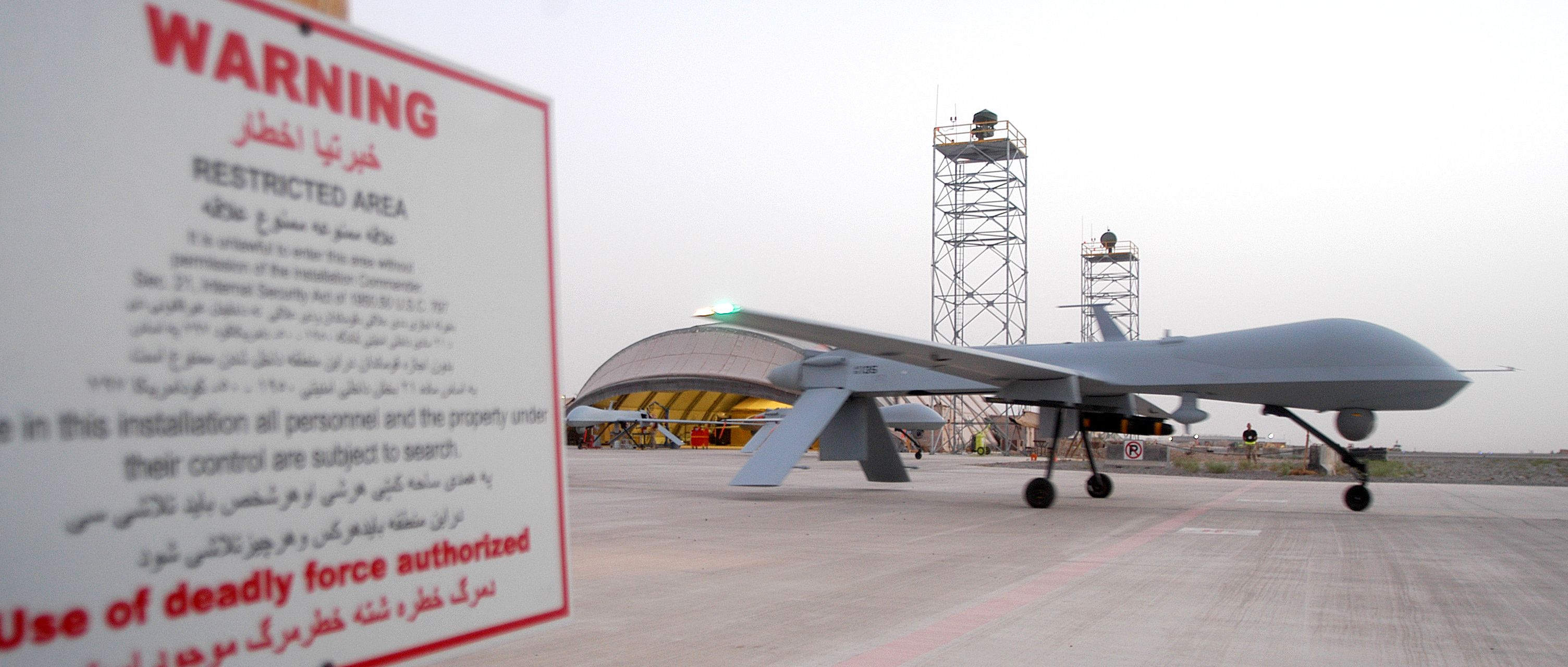
- An MQ-1 Predator taxis for an Operation Enduring Freedom mission
- Active: 1943–1945; 1961–1965; 2002–c.2021
- Country: United States
- Branch: United States Air Force
- Role: Command of Air Expeditionary forces
- Size: Wing
- Engagements: European Theater of Operations; War in Afghanistan (2001-2021)

Insignia
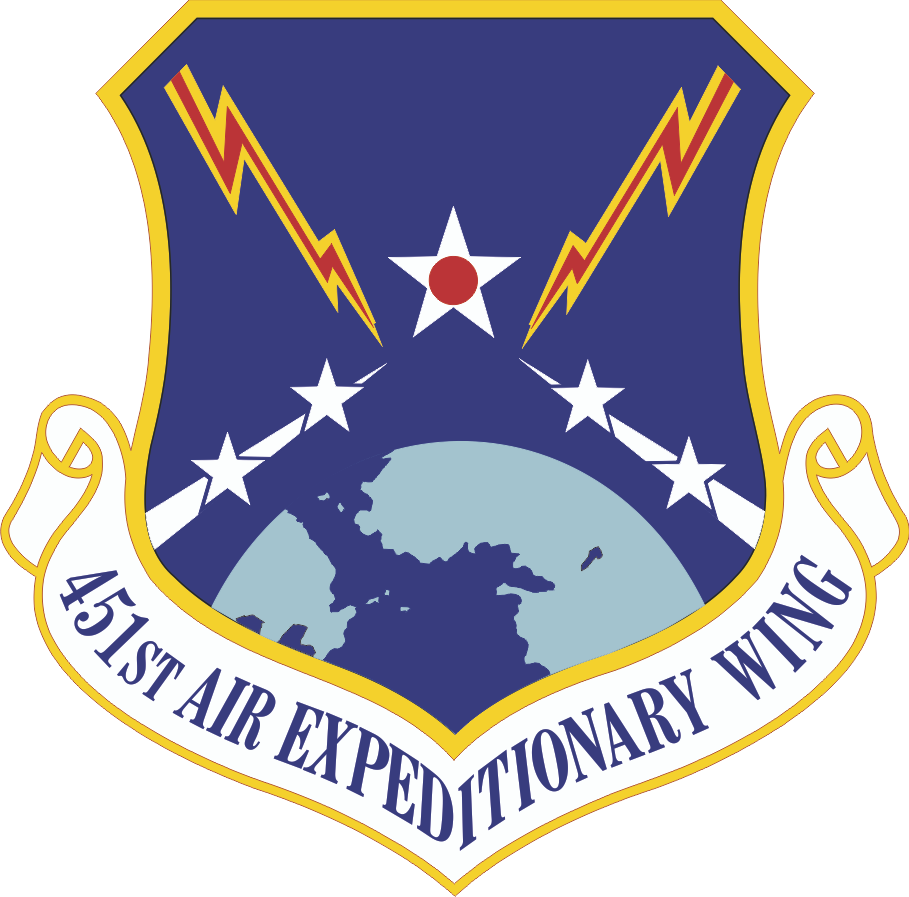
- 451st Air Expeditionary Wing emblem

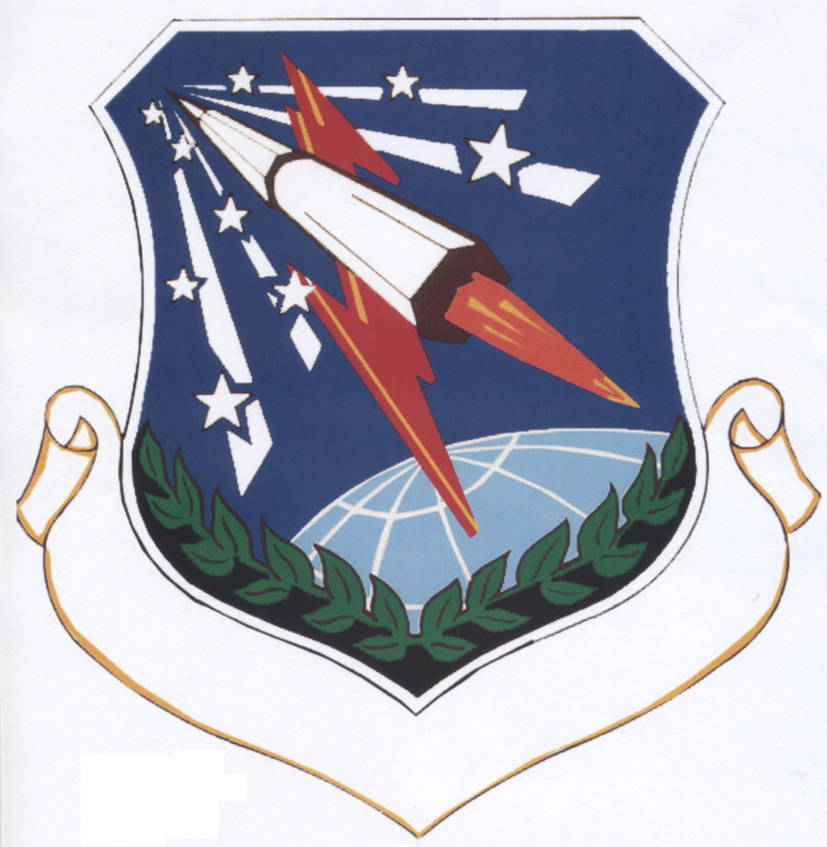
- 451st Strategic Missile Wing emblem (Note: Approved 29 June 1962.)

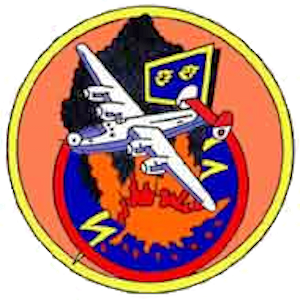
- Unofficial 451st Bombardment Group emblem

The 451st Air Expeditionary Group is a provisional Air Combat Command unit. It was last stationed at Kandahar Airfield and was the host unit at Kandahar. It reported to the 455th Air Expeditionary Wing at Bagram Air Base.

The group provided intelligence, surveillance and reconnaissance, command and control, remotely piloted aircraft operations, and airborne data link capabilities.

During the Cold War, the Strategic Air Command 451st Strategic Missile Wing was the first fully operational HGM-25A Titan I ICBM wing in 1962. During World War II, the Wing's predecessor unit, the 451st Bombardment Group was a Consolidated B-24 Liberator heavy bombardment organization, assigned to the Fifteenth Air Force in Italy.

== Units ==
- 62d Expeditionary Reconnaissance Squadron (launch and recovery for MQ-1 Predator and MQ-9 Reaper)
- 73d Expeditionary Air Control Squadron
- 303d Expeditionary Fighter Squadron
- 361st Expeditionary Reconnaissance Squadron
- 430th Expeditionary Electronic Combat Squadron
- 451st Expeditionary Operations Support Squadron
- 772d Expeditionary Airlift Squadron
- 451st Expeditionary Communications Squadron
- 451st Expeditionary Civil Engineering Squadron
- 451st Expeditionary Logistics Readiness Squadron
- 451st Expeditionary Security Forces Squadron
- 451st Expeditionary Force Support Flight

=== Tenant units ===
- 466th Air Expeditionary Squadron
- 809th RED HORSE Squadron
- 777th Expeditionary Prime BEEF Squadron
- 807th Expeditionary Air Support Operations Squadron

== History ==
=== World War II ===
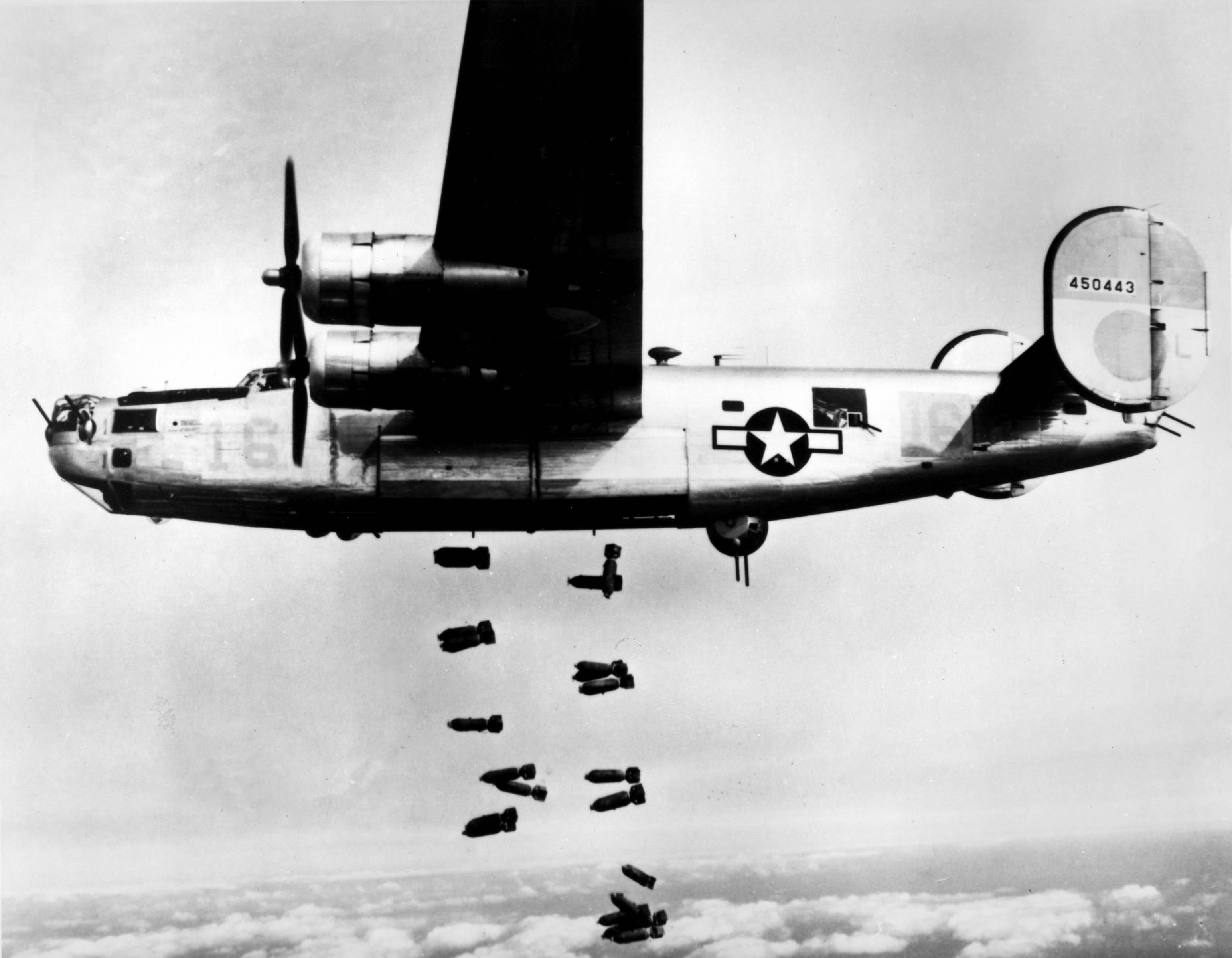
451st Bomb Group B-24 Liberator (Note: Aircraft is Consolidated B-24H-30-CF serial 42-50443 displaying 304th Bombardment Wing markings c. 1945. The upper tail surface and circle were red.)

==== Organization and training in the United States ====
The first predecessor of the group was activated on 1 May 1943 as the 451st Bombardment Group at Davis–Monthan Field, Arizona, with the 724th, 725th, 726th and 727th Bombardment Squadrons assigned as its original elements. Although original plans were for the group to be an Operational Training Unit at Davis–Monthan, instead a cadre of the group moved to Dyersburg Army Air Base, Tennessee, where it was filled out by personnel drawn from the 346th Bombardment Group. Key group staff, plus the commanders and a model crew from each squadron received advanced tactical training with the Army Air Forces School of Applied Tactics at Orlando Army Air Base, Florida. This cadre joined the remainder of the group at Wendover Field, Utah for training with the Consolidated B-24 Liberator. The group continued its training at Fairmont Army Air Field, Nebraska, starting in September. On 18 November, the air echelon of the group departed Fairmont for staging at Lincoln Army Air Field, Nebraska to ferry their aircraft via the Southern Ferrying Route to the Mediterranean Theater of Operations. The ground echelon left on 26 November for the port of embarkation at Camp Patrick Henry, Virginia, for transportation by ship.

==== Combat operations ====
The group arrived at Gioia del Colle Airfield, Italy at the beginning of January 1944, although the air echelon remained at Telergma Airfield, Algeria until 20 January to conduct additional training. The group functioned primarily as a strategic bombing unit, attacking targets like oil refineries, marshalling yards, aircraft factories and airfields in Italy, Germany, France, Czechoslovakia, Austria, Bulgaria, Hungary, Romania, Greece and Albania. It earned a Distinguished Unit Citation during Big Week for an attack on a Messerschmitt aircraft factory at Regensburg, Germany on 25 February 1944. It added oak leaf clusters to this award for an attack on oil refineries and marshalling yards at Ploesti, Romania on 5 April 1944 and on Markersdorf-Haindorf Airfield near Vienna, Austria on 23 August 1944. On each of these missions the 451st was opposed by large numbers of enemy interceptor aircraft and heavy flak, but fought its way through to inflict serious damage on the targets and destroy many enemy aircraft.

When returning from the Regensburg attack, runway conditions at Gioia del Colle were so poor that the aircraft of the 451st Group were unable to land there, but spread out among a number of bases in Italy. These poor conditions continued and on 8 March group headquarters and the 724th and 726th Squadrons moved to San Pancrazio Airfield, Italy, while the 725th and 727th Squadrons moved to Manduria Airfield.

On 6 April, the group assembled at Castelluccio Airfield. From its new base, the group also flew air support and interdiction missions. It helped prepare the way for Operation Dragoon, the invasion of southern France in August 1944. The following month its bombers transported supplies to forces operating in Italy, It also supported Operation Grapeshot, the final advance of Allied armies in northern Italy. The group's last mission was flown on 26 April 1945 against marshalling yards at Sachsenburg, Austria.

The group left Italy in June 1945, with the air echelon ferrying their planes, while most of the ground echelon sailed on the USS General M. C. Meigs to Newport News, Virginia. The group assembled later in the month at Dow Field, Maine, where it was inactivated on 26 September 1945. Personnel that were not discharged from the service on return to the United States were transferred to Air Transport Command units at Dow.

=== Strategic Air Command ===
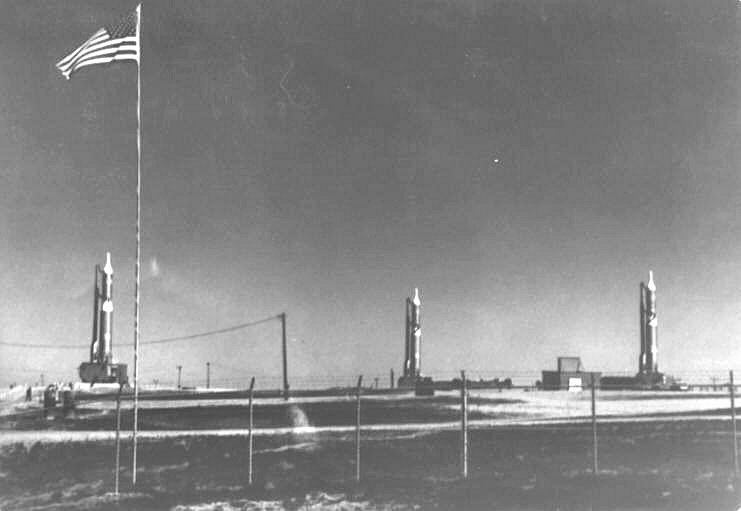
Three 451st Strategic Missile Wing Titan I missiles on alert about 1962

The second predecessor of the group was organized at Lowry Air Force Base, Colorado as the 451st Strategic Missile Wing (ICBM-Titan) on 1 July 1961. The wing assumed the missiles, personnel and equipment of the inactivating 703d Strategic Missile Wing. The 703d Wing had never achieved full operational status, so 451st became the first fully operational HGM-25A Titan I missile wing. Construction on all 18 silos at the six launch complexes was completed by 4 August 1961. On 18 April 1962, Headquarters SAC declared wing's the 724th Squadron operational, and two days later the first Titan Is went on alert status. A month later, the sister 725th Strategic Missile Squadron, which had replaced the 849th Strategic Missile Squadron, declared it had placed all nine of its Titan Is on alert status, which marked a first in Strategic Air Command.

On 19 November 1964, Defense Secretary Robert McNamara announced the phase-out of remaining first-generation SM-65 Atlas and Titan I missiles by the end of June 1965. This objective was met. All wing missiles went off alert status on 26 March 1965 and the wing phased down for inactivation. On 25 June 1965, the wing and the 724th and 725th Squadrons were inactivated. SAC removed the last missile from Lowry on 14 April 1965.

=== War in Afghanistan ===
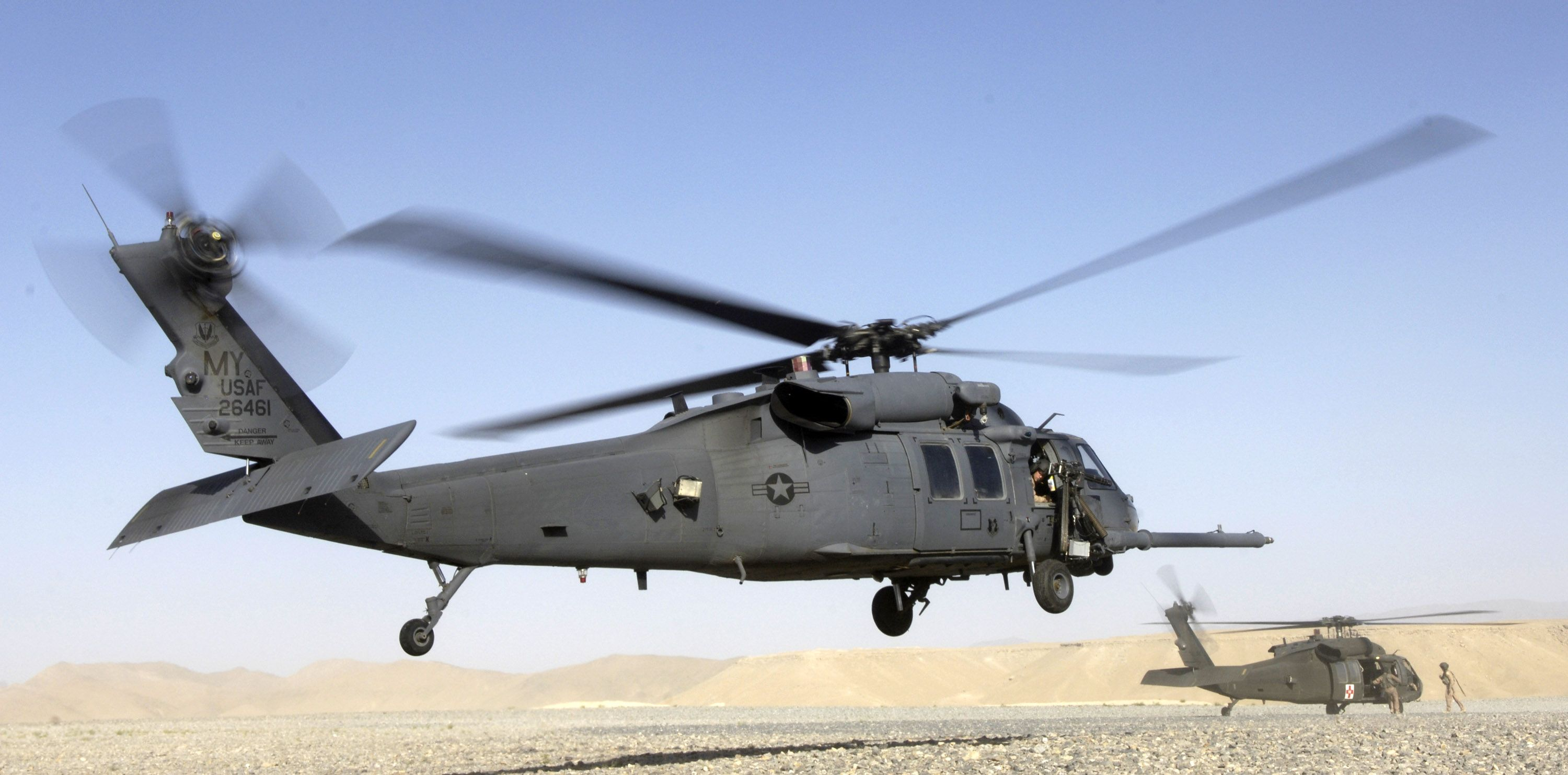
An HH-60 Pave Hawk helicopter lands as an Army UH-60 Blackhawk prepares to pick up a patient

The 451st Air Expeditionary Group was activated in 2002, conducting operations from Kandahar Airfield, Afghanistan. The group was responsible for air control of the southern region of Afghanistan, launch and recovery operations for the MQ-1 Predator and MQ-9 Reaper aircraft, the employment of combat search and rescue forces throughout the entire country, and ground security and airfield defence. Included in the group were safety, logistics, communications, and civil engineer activities.

Due to the growth in size and requirements of the USAF mission at Kandahar, the 451 AEG was enlarged into the 451st Air Expeditionary Wing (451 AEW) and activated as such on 2 July 2009.

The wing was downsized to a group in January 2014 as part of the Afghanistan drawdown.

The group was evacuated from Afghanistan in 2021 as part of the overall 2020–2021 U.S. troop withdrawal from Afghanistan and have become effectively inactive.

Former components:

- 451st Expeditionary Operations Group
  - 702d Expeditionary Airlift Squadron (C-27J Spartan, 31 July 2011 – 18 June 2012)
- 451st Expeditionary Maintenance Group
  - 451st Expeditionary Aircraft Maintenance Squadron
  - 451st Expeditionary Maintenance Squadron
- 451st Expeditionary Mission Support Group
  - 451st Expeditionary Logistics Readiness Squadron
- 651st Air Expeditionary Group
  - 26th Expeditionary Rescue Squadron (inactivated 1 January 2014)
  - 46th Expeditionary Rescue Squadron (September 2010 – inactivated early 2013)
  - 651st Expeditionary Aeromedical Evacuation Squadron (inactivated Dec 2013)

== Lineage ==
451st Bombardment Group

- Constituted as the 451st Bombardment Group (Heavy) on 6 April 1943

Activated on 1 May 1943
Redesignated 451st Bombardment Group, Heavy on 10 May 1943
Inactivated on 26 September 1945
Consolidated on 31 January 1984 with the 451st Strategic Missile Wing as the 451st Strategic Missile Wing

451st Strategic Missile Wing

- Established as the 451st Strategic Missile Wing (ICBM-Titan) 1 July 1961 and activated (not organized)

Organized 1 July 1961
Discontinued and inactivated on 25 June 1965
Consolidated on 31 January 1984 with the 451st Bombardment Group

- Redesignated 451st Air Expeditionary Group, converted to provisional status and assigned to Air Combat Command to activate or inactivate as needed on 3 May 2002

Activated 2 May 2002

Redesignated 451st Air Expeditionary Wing on 2 July 2009
Redesignated 451st Air Expeditionary Group c. 3 January 2014
Inactivated c. 2021

=== Assignments ===
- II Bomber Command, 1 May 1943
- Second Air Force, 6 October 1943
- 47th Bombardment Wing, c. 11 December 1943
- 49th Bombardment Wing, 7 April 1944
- Air Transport Command, c. 19 June – 16 September 1945
- Strategic Air Command, 26 April 1961 (not organized)
- 13th Air Division (later 13th Strategic Missile Division), 1 July 1961 – 25 June 1965
- Air Combat Command to activate or inactivate as needed

455th Air Expeditionary Wing, 2 May 2002
9th Air and Space Expeditionary Task Force, 2 July 2009 – c. 2021

=== Components ===
Groups

- 451st Expeditionary Maintenance Group, 2 July 2009 – 3 January 2014
- 451st Expeditionary Mission Support Group, 2 July 2009 – 3 January 2014
- 451st Expeditionary Operations Group, 2 July 2009 – 3 January 2014

Squadrons

- 724th Bombardment Squadron (later 724th Strategic Missile Squadron), 1 May 1943 – 26 September 1945; 1 July 1961 – 25 June 1965
- 725th Bombardment Squadron (later 725th Strategic Missile Squadron), 1 May 1943 – 26 September 1945; 1 July 1961 – 25 June 1965
- 726th Bombardment Squadron, 1 May 1943 – 26 September 1945
- 727th Bombardment Squadron, 1 May 1943 – 26 September 1945

=== Stations ===
- Davis–Monthan Field, Arizona, 1 May 1943 – 5 June 1943
- Dyersburg Army Air Base, Tennessee, 3 June 1943
- Wendover Field, Utah c. 18 July 1943
- Fairmont Army Air Field, Nebraska 9 September – 16 November 1943
- Gioia del Colle Airfield, Italy c. 10 January 1944
- San Pancrazio Airfield, Italy c. 5 March 1944
- Castelluccio Airfield, Italy c. 6 April 1944 – June 1945
- Dow Field, Maine c. 19 June – 16 September 1945
- Lowry Air Force Base, Colorado 26 April 1961 – 25 June 1965
- Kandahar International Airport, Afghanistan, 2002 – 2021

=== Aircraft ===
- Consolidated B-24 Liberator, 1943–1945
- HGM-25A Titan I 1961–1965
- General Dynamics F-16 Fighting Falcon Post 2002
- Fairchild Republic A-10C Thunderbolt II Post 2002
- Lockheed Martin C-130J Super Hercules Post 2002
- Alenia C-27J Spartan Post 2002
- Northrop Grumman E-11A BACN Post 2002
- Beechcraft U-21 King Air Post 2002
- Sikorsky HH-60G Pave Hawk Post 2002
- Beechcraft MC-12 Huron Post 2002
- General Atomics MQ-1 Predator Post 2002
- General Atomics MQ-9 Reaper Post 2002
