= Dyersburg Army Air Base =

Former military base in Lauderdale County, Tennessee

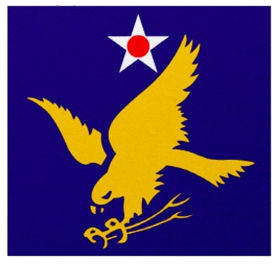
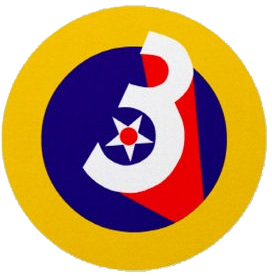
Dyersburg Army Air Base
- Part of Second Air Force; Third Air Force
- Located Near: Halls, Tennessee
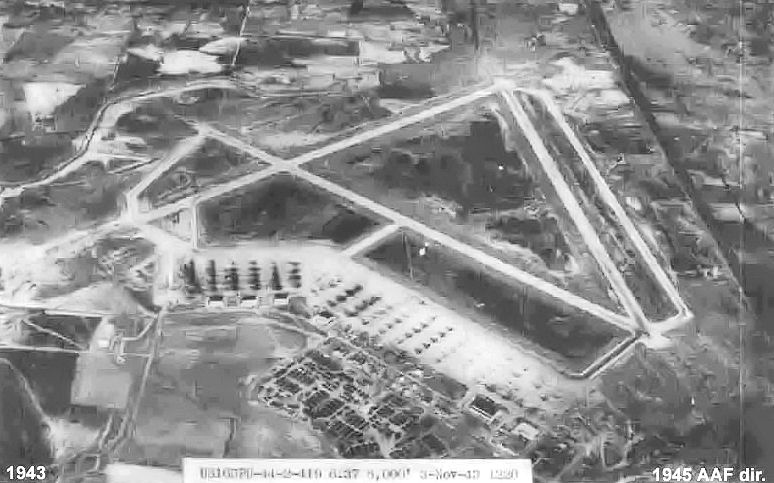
- Dyersburg Army Air Base – 3 November 1943

Location
- Location of Dyersburg Army Air Base
- Coordinates: 35°54′12″N 89°23′50″W

Site history
- Built by: United States Air Force
- In use: 1942–1945
- Battles/wars: World War II

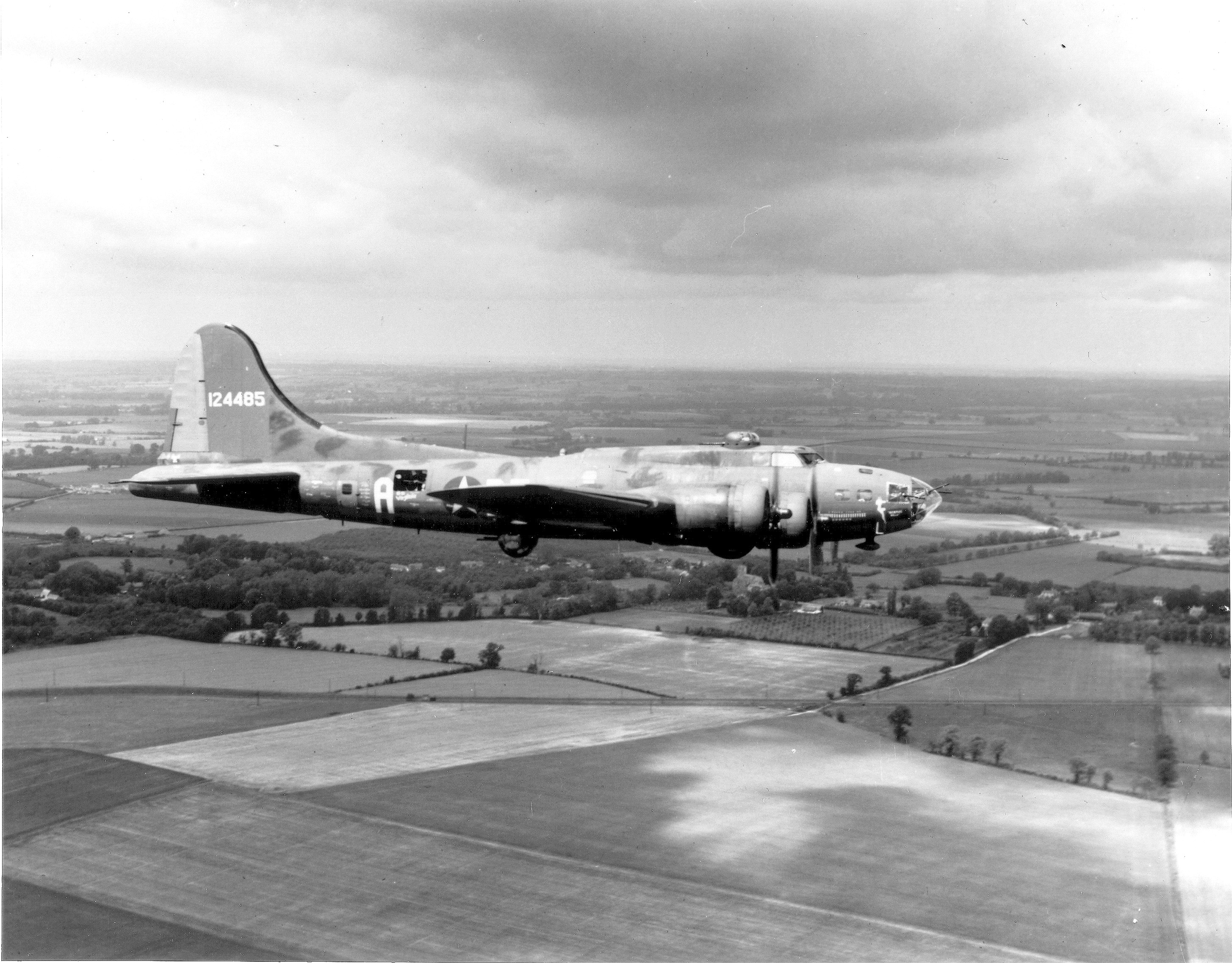
Boeing B-17 Flying Fortress, Serial 41-24485, The Memphis Belle

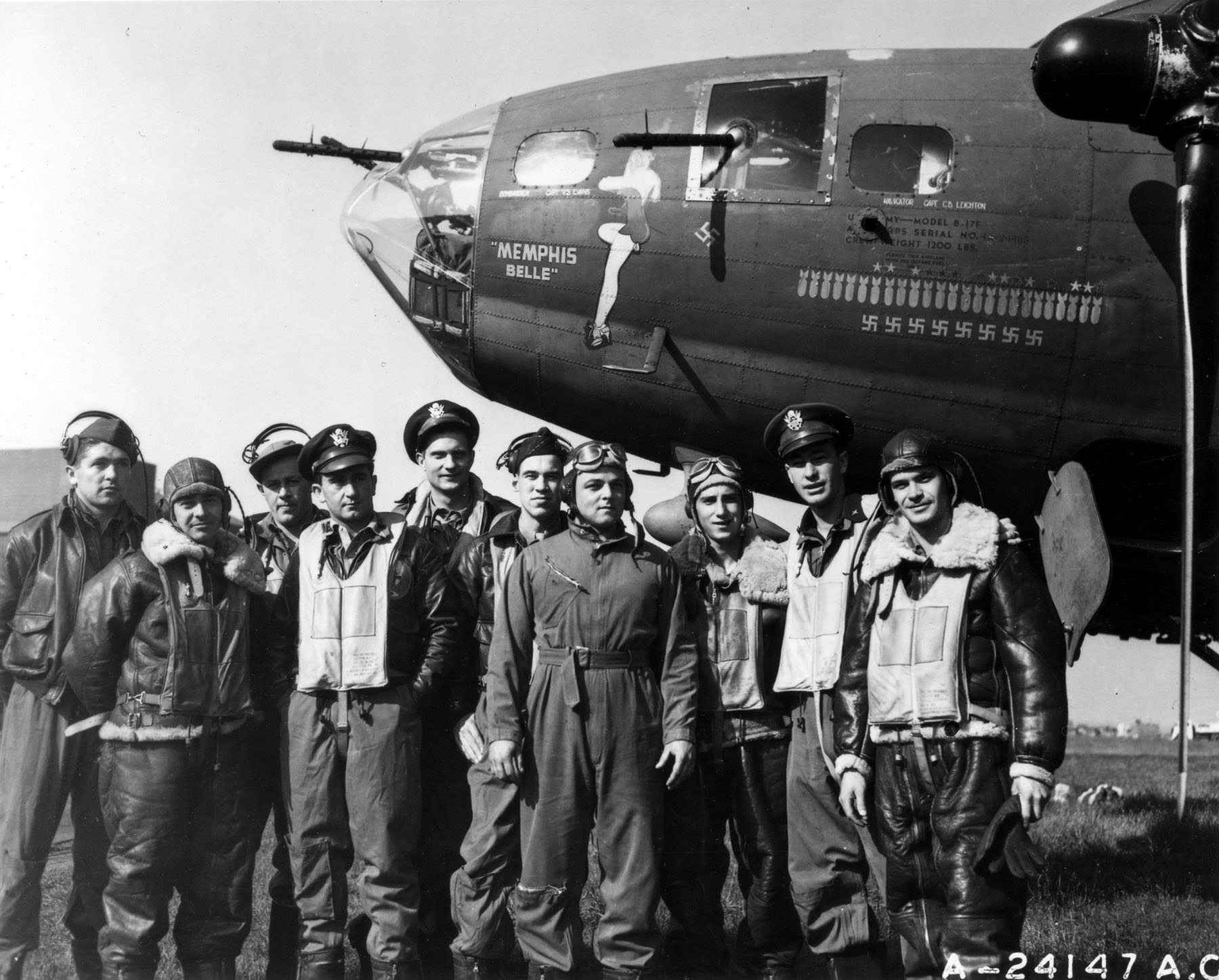
Crew of the Memphis Belle

Dyersburg Army Air Base is an inactive United States Air Force base, approximately 2 miles north of Halls, Tennessee. It was active during World War II as a training airfield. It was closed on 30 November 1945

Dyersburg AAB was the largest combat aircrew training school built during the early war years. It was the only inland B-17 Flying Fortress training base east of the Mississippi River. The base was located on 2,541 acres (10.28 km^{2}), not including the practice range. Approximately 7,700 crewmen received their last phase training at DAAB. 114 crew men lost their lives.

== History ==
=== Origins ===
The Dyersburg Army Air Base (DAAB), promoted by Congressman Jere Cooper and solicited by local officials of Dyersburg in 1941, was actually located near the edge of Halls, Tennessee since an Army study indicated that the Lauderdale County site was better suited for the base.

The origins of Dyersburg Army Air Base begin in early 1942 when the War Department became interested in building an air base in the Halls, Tennessee area. Tennessee congressmen encouraged the Air Corps, and an article in the local newspaper at the end of March noted the visits by Army survey teams to the area. Further reports by the paper were noted throughout the spring of 1942 and on 13 April, the first offers for land purchases were opened and office space for Army officials was leased in Halls for engineering space. Approximately 2,400 acres of land was leased by the War Department and turned over to the Air Corps at the present Arnold Field, this included the relocation of over 70 families from their traditional homesteads. Grading of the land began in late May.

Dyersburg Army Air Base officially became active with the activation of the 910th Quartermaster Company Aviation (Service), on 26 August 1942, however the base was far from ready for operational service. Other early units assigned with the 908th Guard Squadron on 19 October and the 373d Sub-depot on 1 October.

Construction of the base began in earnest in September when runway construction began, as well as the building of a large support base with barracks, various administrative buildings, maintenance shops and hangars. The station facility consisted of a large number of buildings based on standardized plans and architectural drawings, with the buildings designed to be the "cheapest, temporary character with structural stability only sufficient to meet the needs of the service which the structure is intended to fulfill during the period of its contemplated war use" was underway. To conserve critical materials, most facilities were constructed of wood, concrete, brick, gypsum board and concrete asbestos. Metal was sparsely used. The station was designed to be nearly self-sufficient, with not only hangars, but barracks, warehouses, hospitals, dental clinics, dining halls, and maintenance shops were needed. There were libraries, social clubs for officers, and enlisted men, and stores to buy living necessities.

Three long 6,167' runways were constructed in a triangle configuration, oriented N/S, NE/SW and SW/NE. An extra-large parking ramp was constructed for the four-engine bombers along with numerous taxiways and navigational aids. Construction continued through the fall and winter of 1942 and 1943, and by the summer of 1943 the station consisted of over 300 buildings of various configurations and uses. In effect, a city was built on what was a year earlier cotton fields.

Although barracks were moved from other sites and many built for the soldiers, very little housing was available for families. Citizens in Brownsville, Ripley, Halls and Dyersburg made room for the influx of wives, mothers and children who wanted to spend a short time with their soldiers before they went to combat. Attics, garages, and closets were transformed into sleeping areas. Vice-President Harry Truman visited the base during the war as did country singer Roy Acuff and Governor Jim McCord.

=== Heavy Bomber Training ===
Dyersburg AAB was placed under the Army Air Forces II Bomber Command on 1 February 1943, and the 346th Bombardment Group was assigned to the field on 26 February with four training squadrons. The 502d and 505th Bombardment squadrons provided B-24 Liberator training, while the 503d and 504th Bombardment squadrons provided B-17 Flying Fortress combat crew training.

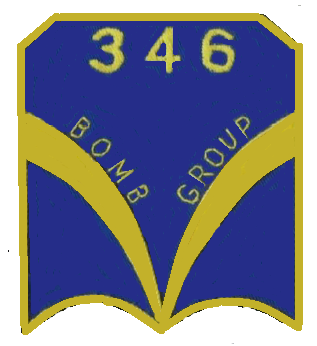
346th Bombardment Group emblem

The first fatal accident occurred on 17 April 1943, when a B-17F, piloted by 2nd Lieut. James Koller of Reading, PA, crashed in a landing accident 3 miles north of the airfield. The aircraft was completely destroyed in the crash. Also killed in the crash were Claud Zimmerman of Hooversville, PA and Robert McCune of New Castle, PA.

Training conducted at the field were second and third phases of combat crew training. These phases of training were designed to train flight crew members of the heavy bombers to blend their individual skills together into a team. Second phase training was focused on bombing, gunnery and flying the aircraft under instrument flight conditions. These training missions were flown with full crews. Third phase training emphasized squadron and group operations, especially with formation flying in the combat "box" which was developed by Eighth Air Force to maximize the firepower of the bomber aircraft while also maximizing its defenses against attacking enemy fighters. Also long distance navigation, target identification was taught along with mock combat runs over targets.

Ground synthetic training devices, such as the Celestial Navigation Tower were also used. This device simulated flying conditions in any weather, day or night and taught instrument flying, radio navigation and also flying by stars at night. Another training device was called the "ditching pond" which taught heavy bomber pilots how to perform controlled water landings.

To help acclimate the combat crews soon to be deployed to Eighth Air Force, some streets and buildings on the base were renamed with English names of bases in the United Kingdom. Dyersburg AAF was unofficially called "Peterborough Airdrome" after a simulated station in England.

In June 1943, the 451st Bombardment Group arrived at Dyersburg, the only operational group to be trained as a unit at the base. Its 724th, 725th, 726th and 727th Bombardment Squadrons underwent second and third phase training with the group's B-17s at the base separately from the 346th, with B-24 Liberators before leaving for Wendover Field, Utah in July before deploying to Twelfth Air Force in North Africa during November.

On 1 May 1944, the 346th Bombardment Group was inactivated as part of an overall reorganization of training. Dyersburg assumed responsibility for all three phases of heavy bomber training, phase one training added night flying and long distance flying training for navigators. Bombardier training and gunnery training was also added. The 346th was re-designated the 223d Combat Crew Training School, Army Air Field, Dyersburg, Tennessee. The four training squadrons were redesignated as squadron "A", "B", "C" and "D". In December 1944, P-63 Kingcobra fighters were assigned to the school to help train flexible gunners in fighter defense.

1 March 1945 saw the transfer of Dyersburg AAB jurisdiction from Second Air Force to Third Air Force, as the mission of Second Air Force became the training of B-29 Superfortress crews and replacement personnel. The 223d CCTS was re designated to the 330th. There was also a decline in the training hours from three five-hour periods each day to two, six days a week. Third Air Force, whose primary focus was fighter pilot training, also assigned additional fighter aircraft types to the field, including P-40 Warhawks and later, with P-51 Mustangs. Several different types of fighters, with different flying characteristics increased the reality of training for student gunners.

=== WASPs at Dyersburg Army Airfield ===
Towards the latter end of the base's operations during World War 2, a small detachment of five Women Army Service Pilots were stationed at the flight school. While the full extent of their work is not known, according to oral history accounts Dorothy Hawkins Goot flew gunnery patterns, and Frances Smith Tuchband conducted operation in B-17s and L-5s.

=== Closure ===
With the end of the war in Europe in May 1945, Dyersburg AAB was out of a job. The B-29 Superfortress was the strategic bomber used in the Pacific, and replacement heavy bomber crews were no longer needed. Those B-24 Liberator squadrons still operating in India and Burma, along with the B-24s used by Fifth and Seventh Air Forces in the Pacific could be supported by a limited number of trainees at Dyersburg (Note: B-17s were withdrawn from the Pacific in 1943, and never used to any great degree in the CBI). Training was drastically curtailed, and was completely stopped by the end of August with the Japanese surrender.

To quote Lt. Colonel Robert Little (Ret.), "Our job was to give about one hundred more hours of flying – we would give them instrument flying, a lot of take offs and landings, some formations, and a little bit of navigation – to men coming from camps like Roswell, New Mexico, and a transition school for B-17s."

On 1 September 1945 Dyersburg AAF was placed on standby status by Third Air Force. Despite a flurry of activity by Congressmen representing Tennessee, the facility was closing, as most temporary training airfields in the United States were. Demobilization was the word of the day.

In 1946, with World War II over, the DAAB was deactivated, and the base was hastily dismantled, land was sold, and barracks and guard shacks were moved to private property. The former morgue was moved and became a two bedroom residence later occupied by a mayor of Halls. The Army left as quickly as it arrived.

Halls Dragstrip, an unsanctioned drag way, was located on the site throughout the 1960s and 1970s.

=== Dyersburg AAB Today ===
When the base closed it was converted to civilian uses. The airfield became "Arnold Field Airport", and over the years, the hundreds of buildings of the support station located to the southwest of the airfield were sold, removed or torn down. Today, the only evidence of the containment area are a Norden bombsight storage building, tall chimneys where the theatre and other sites were located, and the large aircraft parking 95 acres (0.38 km^{2}) apron. Forlorn of aircraft, the apron now had hundreds of over the road trailers and an open storage yard with a few buildings erected on the concrete. One wartime hangar out of the original five remain. The Dyersburg Army Air Base Memorial Veterans' Museum, in which a large number of artifacts and other exhibits are on display, is in a building on the former aircraft parking apron.

A large agricultural chemical plant was built on the former station area, but much of it was removed with the roads and streets torn up; the land returned to agricultural production, with the street grid of the support station being obliterated.

The former north-south runway is used as the runway for Arnold Field Airport, along with many overgrown items apparently dumped on the parallel north-south taxiway of the old military airbase. The other two runways and assorted taxiways of the former airfield remain, abandoned, but appear in good condition despite decades of disuse.

== Major Aircraft Assigned ==
- Boeing B-17 Flying Fortress
- Consolidated B-24 Liberator
- Bell P-63 Kingcobra
- Curtiss P-40 Warhawk
- North American P-51 Mustangs
- Boeing B-29 Superfortress

== Major Units Assigned ==
- 223rd Army Airfield Base Unit, 20 March 1944
- 330th Army Air Force Base Unit
- 346th Bombardment Group, Very Heavy, 26 February 1943 – 1 April 1944
  - 502nd Bombardment Squadron, Heavy
  - 503rd Bombardment Squadron, Heavy
  - 504th Bombardment Squadron, Heavy
  - 505th Bombardment Squadron, Heavy
- 419th Base Headquarters and Air Base Squadron, 26 August 1942 - 1 April 1944
- 451st Bombardment Group, Heavy, 3 June 1943
  - 724th Bombardment Squadron, Heavy
  - 725th Bombardment Squadron, Heavy
  - 726th Bombardment Squadron, Heavy
  - 727th Bombardment Squadron, Heavy

== See also ==
- Tennessee World War II Army Airfields
