= Gioia del Colle Air Base =

Gioia del Colle Air Base

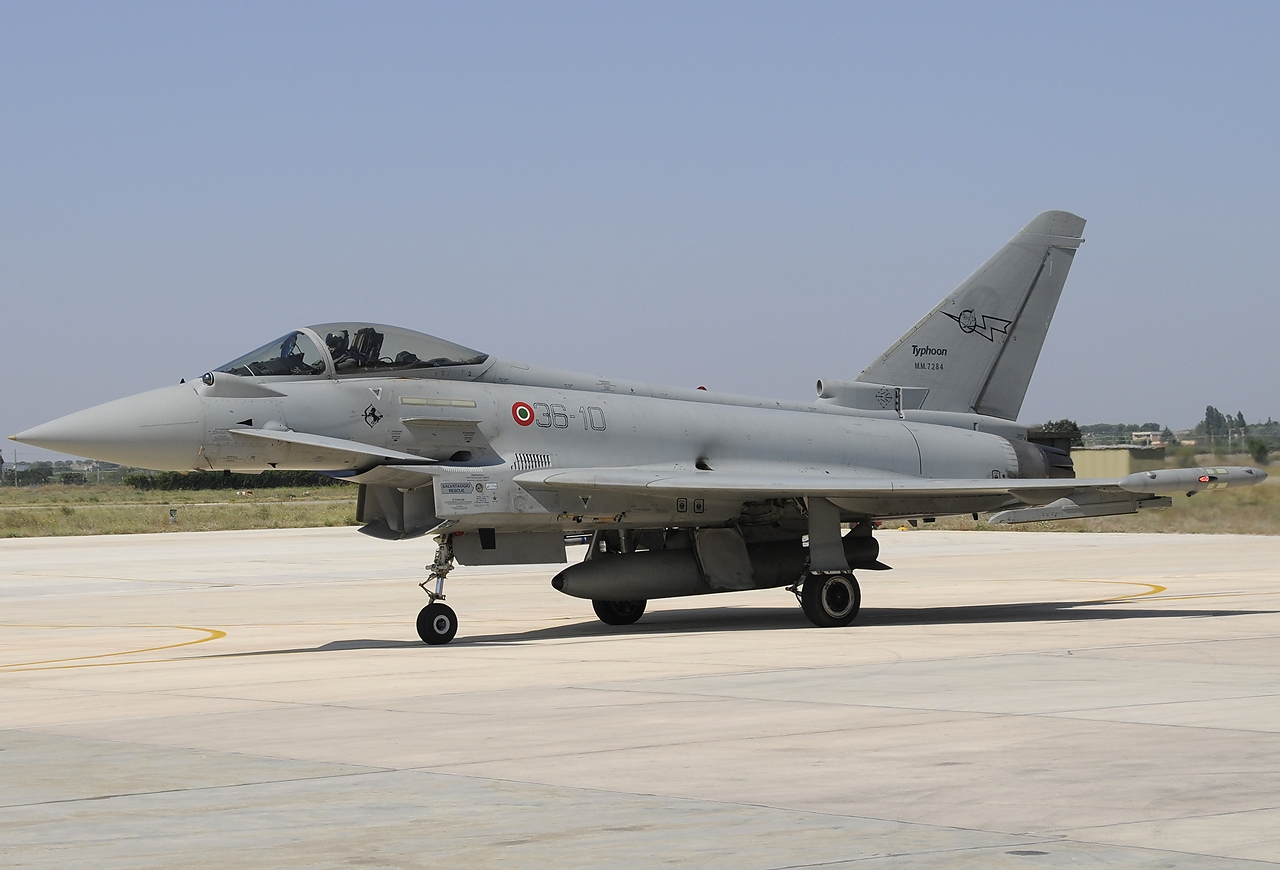
- Italian Eurofighter Typhoon at Gioia del Colle Air Base
- IATA: none; ICAO: LIBV

Summary
- Airport type: Military
- Location: Gioia del Colle, Italy
- Elevation AMSL: 1,186 ft (361 m)
- Coordinates: 40°45′51″N 016°56′00″E

Map
- Location of Gioia del Colle Air Base, Italy
- Source:World Aero Data

Gioia del Colle Air Base (ICAO: LIBV) is an Italian Air Force (Aeronautica Militare) base located in the province of Bari, Apulia, Italy, located approximately 1 kilometre (0.6 mi) south-southeast of Gioia del Colle.

== World War II ==
During World War II the air base was captured by the British Eighth Army in October 1943 and subsequently used by the United States Army Air Forces Twelfth Air Force and Fifteenth Air Force. It was known as Gioia del Colle Airfield by the Americans. Known combat units operating from the airfield were:

- 1st Fighter Group, 8 December 1943 – 8 January 1944, P-38 Lightning
- 57th Fighter Group, 25–30 September 1943, P-40 Warhawk
- 451st Bombardment Group, 10 January-5 March 1944 B-24 Liberator
- 464th Bombardment Group, 21 April 1944 - 1 June 1944 B-24 Liberator

The airfield was also used by troop carrier units working with British paratroopers (8th Troop Carrier Squadron) as well as by Air Technical Service Command as a maintenance and supply depot. (41st/38th Air Depot). It was turned over to the Allied Italian Co-Belligerent Air Force (Aviazione Cobelligerante Italiana, or ACI) in September 1945.

== Present ==
The base is an Italian military facility, presently home of the 36th Stormo, flying the Eurofighter Typhoon.

If necessary, the base can host personnel and aircraft of both the Italian Air Force, as well as other nations in NATO.

As part of the Coalition intervention in Libya, resulting from the 2011 Libyan civil war and the subsequent enforcement of United Nations Security Council Resolution 1973, it became the forward operating base for units of the Royal Air Force, operating both the Panavia Tornado GR4 and Eurofighter Typhoon aircraft.

== See also ==
- List of airports in Italy
