= USS General M. C. Meigs =

United States troop ship

Coordinates: 48°17′10″N 124°41′15″W

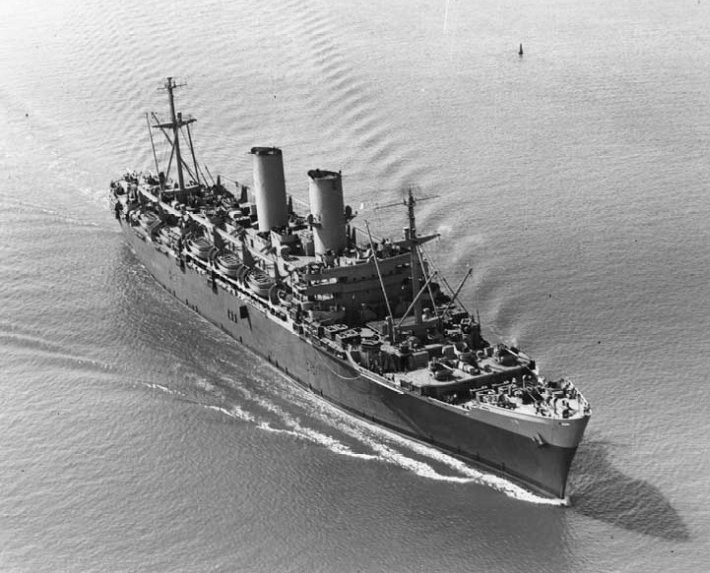
- USS General M. C. Meigs (AP-116), Hampton Roads, 4 July 1944

History

United States
- Name: USS General M. C. Meigs
- Namesake: General M. C. Meigs, US Army
- Builder: Federal Shipbuilding & Drydock
- Laid down: 22 September 1943
- Launched: 13 March 1944
- Sponsored by: Mrs Henry R. Arnold
- Acquired: 2 June 1944
- Commissioned: 3 June 1944 – 4 March 1946
- Recommissioned: 21 July 1950
- Decommissioned: 1 October 1958
- Reclassified: T-AP-116 (21 July 1950)
- Identification: MC hull type P2-S2-R2, MC hull no. 674
- Honors and awards: 6 service stars for Korean War service
- Fate: Broken up after being stranded on 9 January 1972

General characteristics
- Class & type: General John Pope-class transport
- Displacement: 11,450 tons (lt); 20,175 tons fully laden
- Length: 622 feet 7 inches (189.76 m)
- Beam: 75 feet 6 inches (23.01 m)
- Draft: 25 feet 6 inches (7.77 m)
- Installed power: 17,000 shp
- Propulsion: 2 steam turbines, reduction gearing, twin screw
- Speed: 21 knots (39 km/h)
- Capacity: 5,289
- Complement: 418
- Armament: 4 x single 5"/38 caliber dual purpose guns, 4 x quad 1.1" guns, replaced by 20 x single 20mm guns

USS General M. C. Meigs (AP-116) was a General John Pope class troop transport of the P2-S2-R2 type. She was a fast troop ship that transported troops for the United States in World War II and the Korean War. The ship was named after General Montgomery C. Meigs, the Quartermaster General of the United States Army during the United States Civil War.

General M. C. Meigs was launched on 13 March 1944 under a Maritime Commission contract by the Federal Shipbuilding & Drydock Company of Kearny, New Jersey; she was acquired by the Navy on 2 June 1944, and commissioned at Bayonne, New Jersey the next day with. A fast troop carrier, she was capable of 21 knots (24 mph; 39 km/h) with 5200 troops on board. She was one of several of this class of transports that was crewed by United States Coast Guard personnel.

== World War II ==
After two round-trip, troop-carrying voyages between Newport News, Virginia, and Naples, Italy General Meigs departed for Rio de Janeiro, Brazil, where she was visited by Brazilian President Getúlio Vargas, and embarked 5,200 troops of the Brazilian Expeditionary Force, the first Brazilian troops to be carried by an American transport. She carried these troops to Italy, where they participated in the Italian campaign. At Naples she embarked troops, civilians, and 460 German prisoners of war for transportation to the United States, collecting additional troops at Bizerte, Tunisia, and at Oran, French Algeria.

General Meigs made two similar round-trip voyages from the United States to Italy and North Africa via Brazil, carrying thousands of American and Brazilian troops to Europe for the remaining drive against Nazi Germany, and returning several thousand others to the United States and Brazil. She later deployed troops to Panama and Puerto Rico and to Le Havre, France. From Le Havre, Naples, Marseille, Karachi, and Nagoya, she made six more trips carrying homebound troops for New York and Brazil.

On 4 March 1946, she was decommissioned at San Francisco for transfer to the American President Lines as a passenger ship in the Pacific. She sailed from San Francisco on Jan 24, 1948, arriving in Manila, Philippines on Feb 10.

== Korean War ==
After the outbreak of hostilities in Korea in 1950, General Meigs was assigned to the Military Sea Transportation Service. Crewed by civilians, she made 19 cruises to the Far East carrying thousands of American troops from the West Coast to ports in Japan and South Korea. Following the uncertain armistice on 27 July 1953, she continued to support American readiness in the Far East with troop-rotation cruises in the remainder of 1953 and through 1954.

== Later events ==
Placed in Reduced Operational Status in 1955, she was transferred to the Maritime Administration on 1 October 1958, and entered the National Defense Reserve Fleet at Olympia, Washington.

In 1972 while under tow to the Suisun Bay layup facility, she broke her tow in a storm, and ran aground off the coast of Washington State, where she eventually broke up over the next 4 years, spilling 440,000 liters of heavy oil.

== Awards ==
General M. C. Meigs received six service stars for Korean War service.
