= Markersdorf-Haindorf =

- Municipality
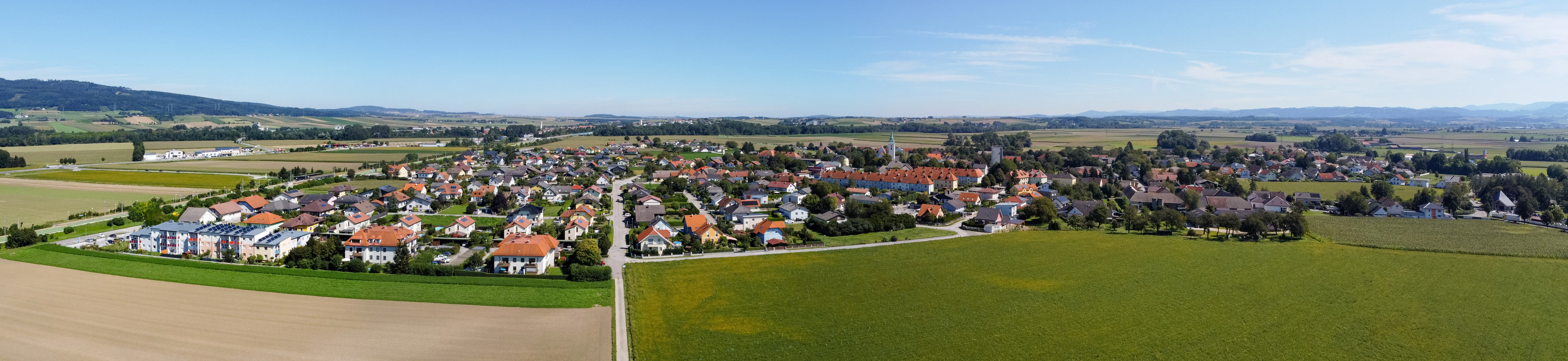
- Markersdorf

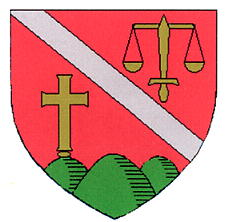
- Coat of arms

- Location within Austria
- Coordinates: 48°11′N 15°30′E
- Country: Austria
- State: Lower Austria
- District: Sankt Pölten-Land

Government
  - Mayor: Willibert Paukowitsch

Area
  - Total: 16.67 km^{2} (6.44 sq mi)
- Elevation: 252 m (827 ft)

Population (2016-01-01)
  - Total: 2,080
  - Density: 125/km^{2} (323/sq mi)
- Time zone: UTC+1 (CET)
  - Summer (DST): UTC+2 (CEST)
- Postal code: 3385
- Area code: 02749
- Website: http://www.markersdorf-haindorf.at

Markersdorf-Haindorf is a town in the district of Sankt Pölten-Land in the Austrian state of Lower Austria.

== Population ==
Historical population
Year	Pop.	±%
1971	1,380	—
1981	1,507	+9.2%
1991	1,581	+4.9%
2001	1,799	+13.8%
