= Sachsenburg =

- Municipality
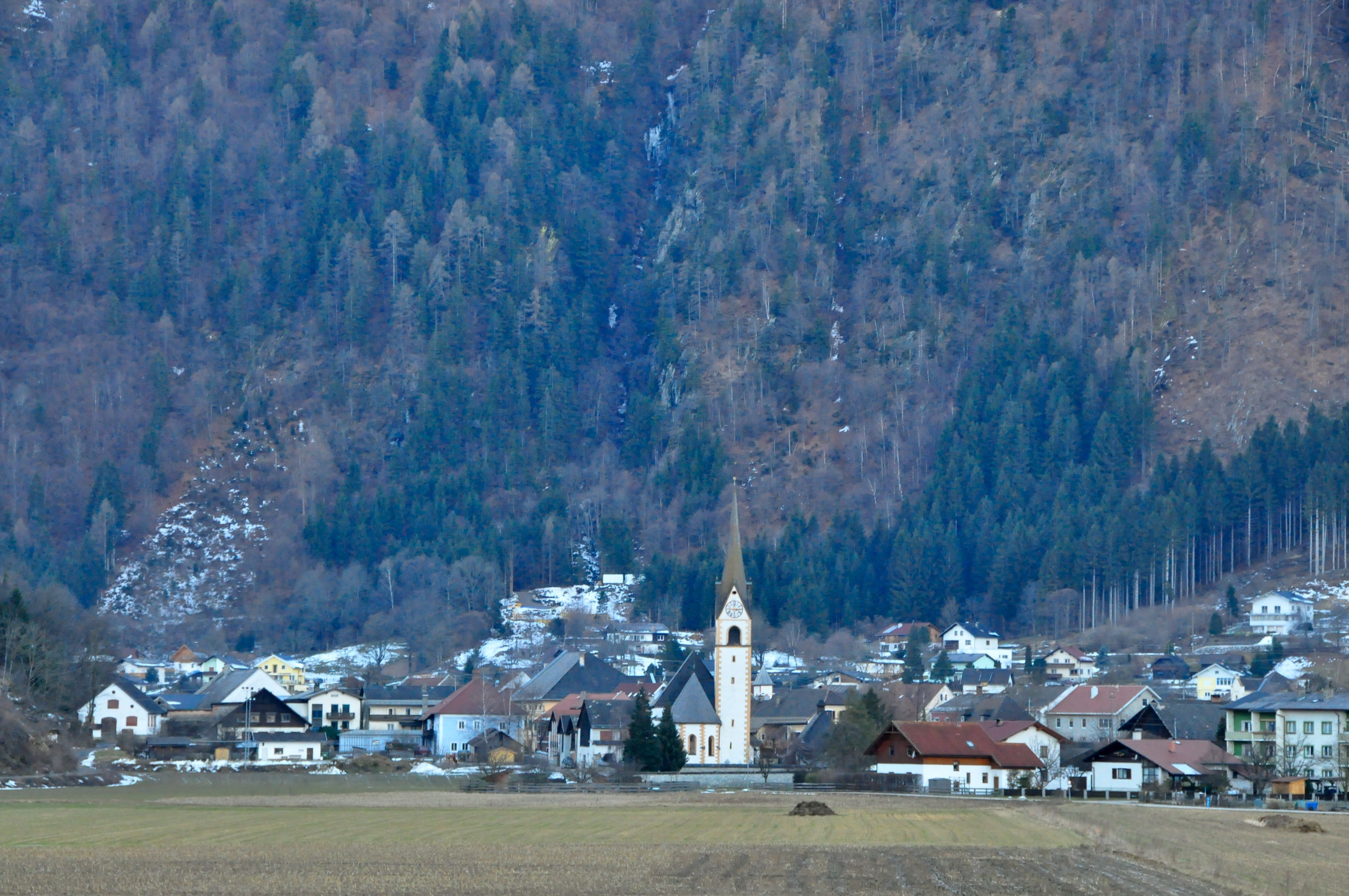
- View from the east

- Coat of arms

- Location within Austria
- Coordinates: 46°49′N 13°21′E
- Country: Austria
- State: Carinthia
- District: Spittal an der Drau

Government
  - Mayor: Wilfried Pichler

Area
  - Total: 42.62 km^{2} (16.46 sq mi)
- Elevation: 557 m (1,827 ft)

Population (2018-01-01)
  - Total: 1,289
  - Density: 30.24/km^{2} (78.33/sq mi)
- Time zone: UTC+1 (CET)
  - Summer (DST): UTC+2 (CEST)
- Postal code: 9751
- Area code: 04769
- Website: www.sachsenburg.at

Sachsenburg is a market town in the district of Spittal an der Drau in Carinthia, Austria.

== Geography ==
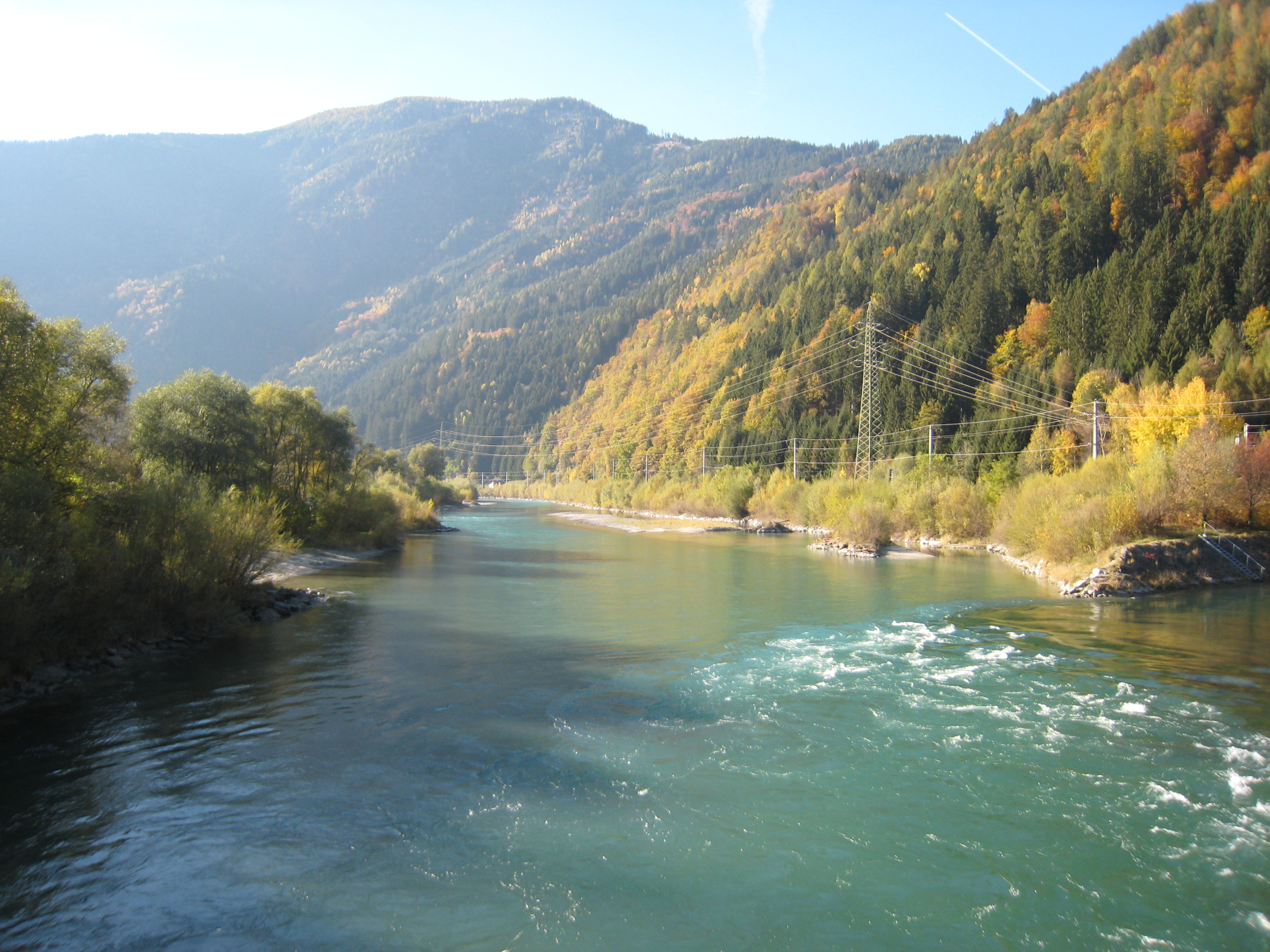
Drava at Sachsenburg

The municipal area stretches along the valley of the Drava river, where it enters the Lurnfeld plain between the Kreuzeck group of the Hohe Tauern mountain range in the north and Gailtal Alps in the south. The municipality comprises the cadastral communities of Sachsenburg and Obergottesfeld.

== History ==
The origin of the name is uncertain: an affiliation with the far apart mediæval Duchy of Saxony has never been established; however the coat of arms probably awarded in the 16th century shows a Saxe, a kind of pan formerly used for gold prospecting within the nearby Hohe Tauern range. The strategically important narrow place of the Drava valley (Sachsenburger Klause) probably was guarded already in Roman times, when the area was part of the Noricum province.

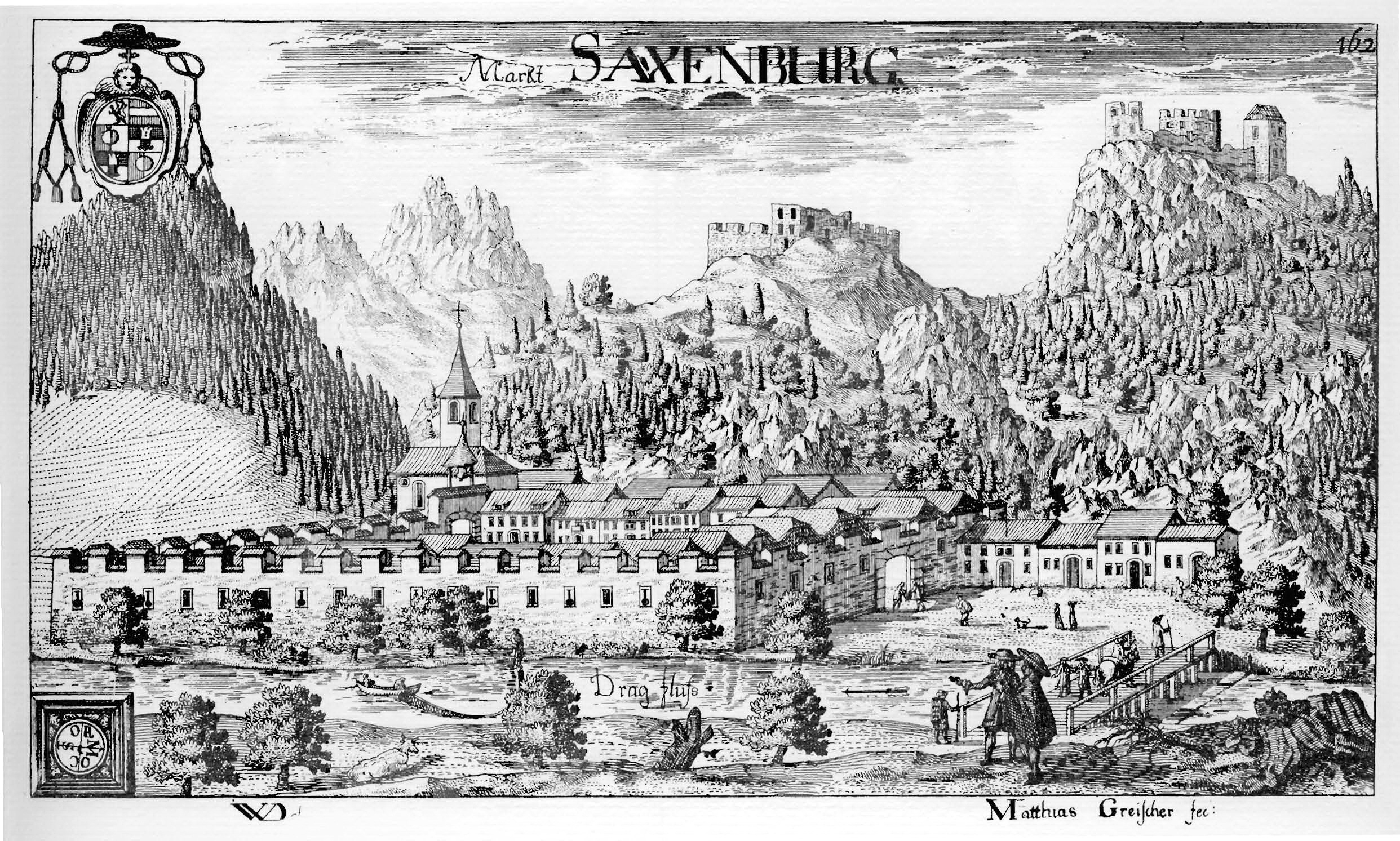
Markt Saxenburg, Johann Weikhard von Valvasor, 1681

Two fortresses blocking the passage along the river were first mentioned in a 1213 deed. Sachsenburg is documented as an administrative seat of the Archbishops of Salzburg in 1292, who held large possessions within the Duchy of Carinthia. As a Salzburg stronghold, it was a thorn in the flesh of both the Carinthian dukes and the Counts of Gorizia at Lienz, therefore often under attack by their forces. In 1252, Count Meinhard III of Gorizia allied with his father-in-law Count Albert IV of Tyrol laid siege to the fortress, though to no avail. The Salzburg archbishops granted the settlement market rights in 1326 and had further ramparts and town walls erected.

Not until 1803 the Salzburg possessions were finally mediatised. The fortifications were razed in 1813, when Upper Carinthia formed the northernmost part of the French-occupied Illyrian Provinces. During the Revolutions of 1848, several citizens on March 20 proclaimed an independent "Republic of Sachsenburg", they were however immediately suppressed by the Austrian military. The Sachsenburg municipality originated in 1850, it was merged with neighbouring Möllbrücke and Pusarnitz into the market town of Lurnfeld, but regained independence in 1992.

== Politics ==
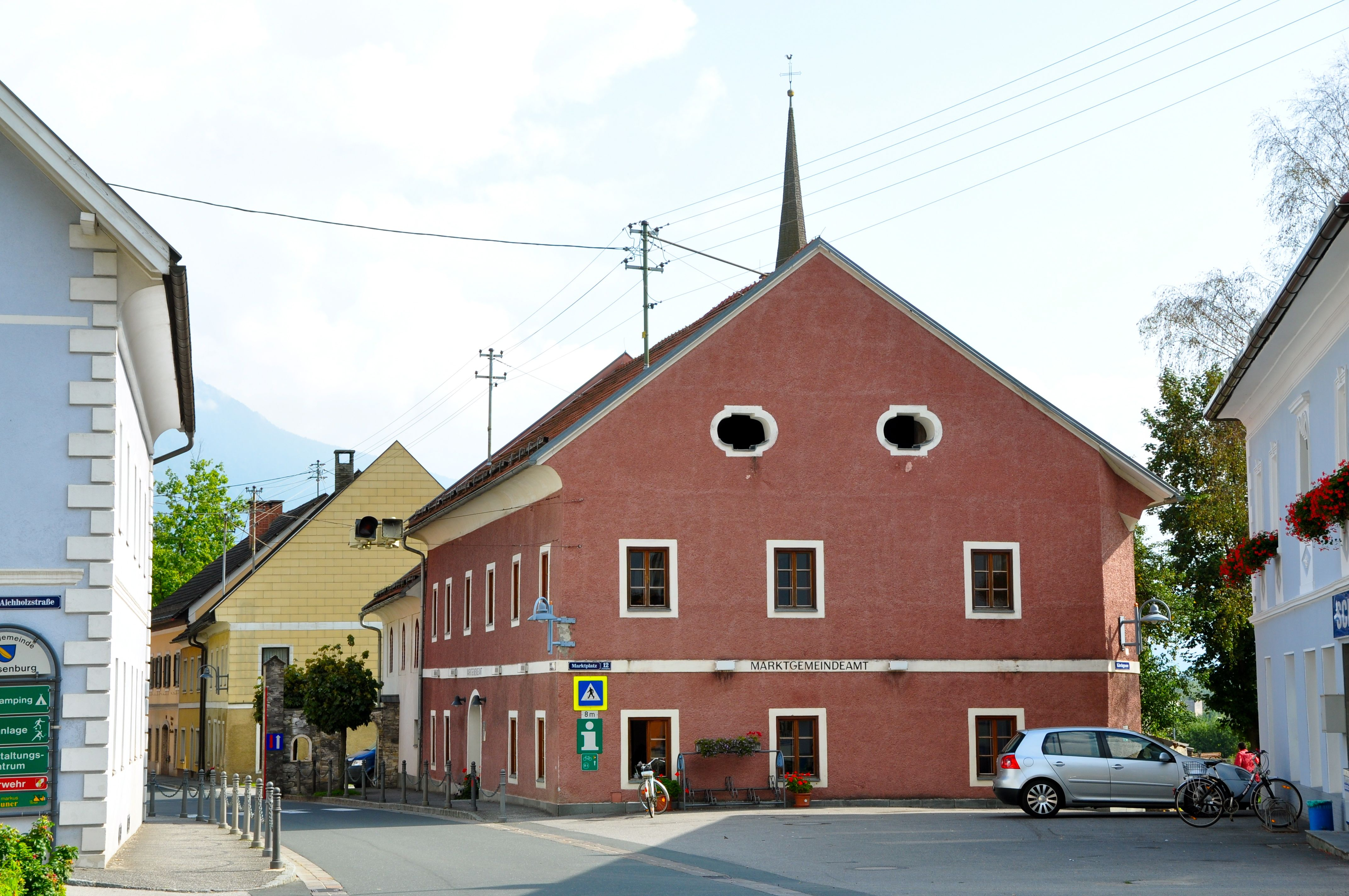
Town hall

Seats in the municipal assembly (Gemeinderat) as of 2015 local elections:

- Aktionsgemeinschaft (Independent): 7
- Social Democratic Party of Austria (SPÖ): 5
- Austrian People's Party (ÖVP): 3

=== Twin towns ===
Sachsenburg is twinned with:

- Spilimbergo, Italy
- Sachsenburg, Frankenberg, Saxony, Germany
