= Camp Patrick Henry =

Decommissioned United States Army post

Camp Patrick Henry Eponym: Patrick Henry
- Newport News, Virginia

Site information
- Type: Staging area for Hampton Roads Port of Embarkation.

Location
- Coordinates: 37.1406°N 76.5059°W

Site history
- Built: 1942
- In use: 1942-1945

Garrison information
- Garrison: Acreage: 1,649; Officer Billeting: 1,621; Enlisted Billeting: 22,916

Camp Patrick Henry is a decommissioned United States Army post which was located in Warwick County, Virginia. After World War II, the site was redeveloped as a commercial airport, and became part of City of Newport News in 1958 when the former County of Warwick and Newport News were politically consolidated as a single independent city. The airport is known in modern times as Newport News/Williamsburg International Airport.

== World War II ==
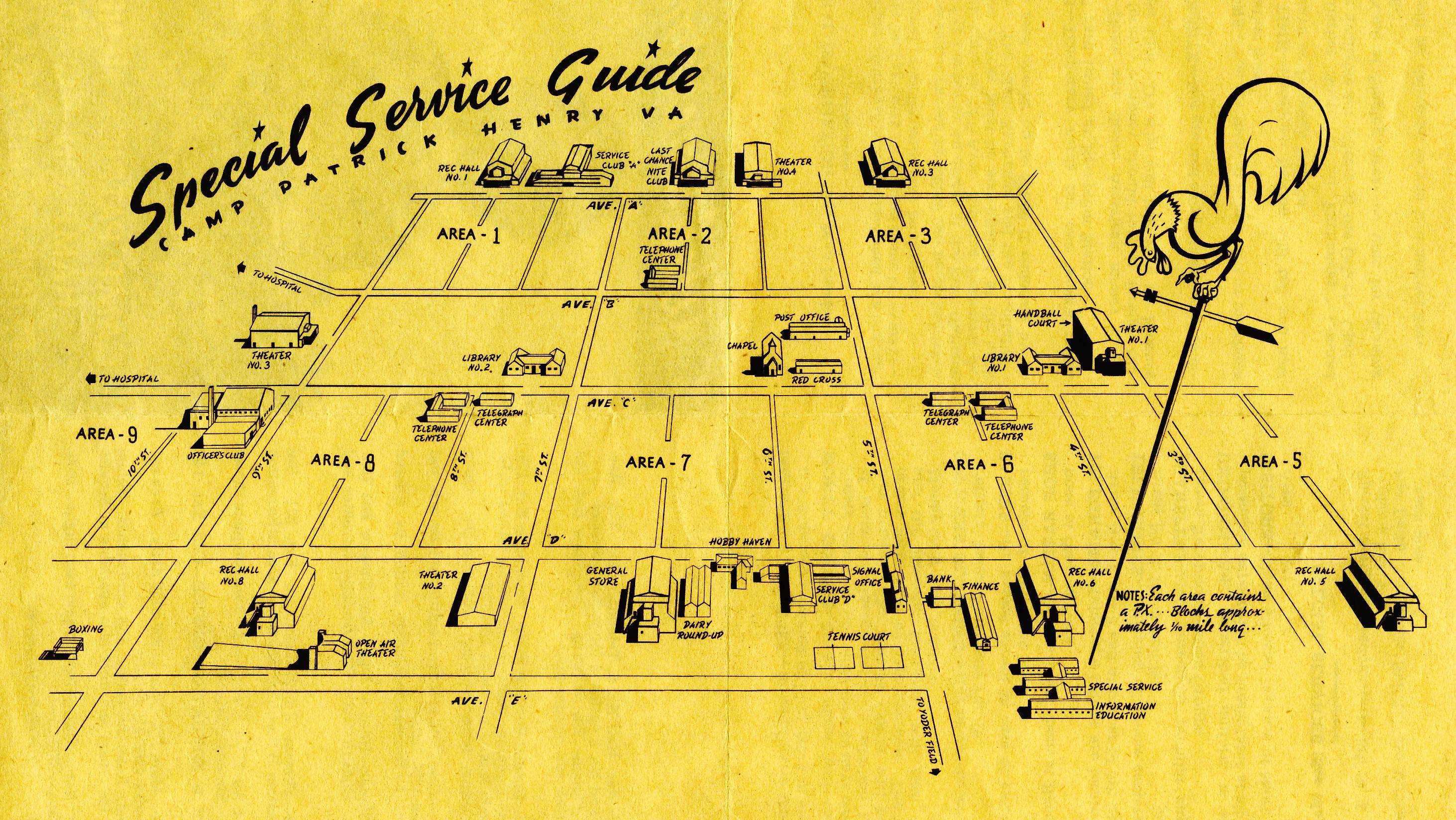
CPH Special Services Guide

The post served primarily as a troop staging ground during World War II under the control of the Hampton Roads Port of Embarkation. The camp was founded in late 1942 and was an approximately 1,700-acre (6.9 km^{2}) complex, built in largely virgin forest. At its peak, Camp Patrick Henry had a capacity of hosting approximately 35,000 individuals at one time. These included American troops of every branch of the military service, troops of other Allied armies, and civilians bound for special missions overseas. Although most of the military personnel processed through the Camp during the war were replacements, many noteworthy units were also staged. Complete units processed in 1943 included the 45th "Thunderbird", the 85th "Custer", and the 88th "Blue Devils" Infantry Divisions. During 1944 the camp handled the 31st "Dixie", the 91st "Powder River" and the 92nd "Buffalo" Infantry Divisions, as well as the 2nd Cavalry Division. In January 1945 the 10th Mountain Infantry Division departed enroute to Italy.

Nearly three quarters of a million men and women passed through the camp during 1943–1944, before boarding transport ships at the Hampton Roads Port of Embarkation, most of them bound for deployment in the Western Europe. By January 31, 1946, the total number of personnel to pass through the camp was 1,412,107. In the later stages of the war, the camp served as a demobilization point for many soldiers returning home.

The camp had its own post office, restaurant, movie theater, as well as rail system which transported soldiers by train downtown to shipside at the James River.

== Gallery ==
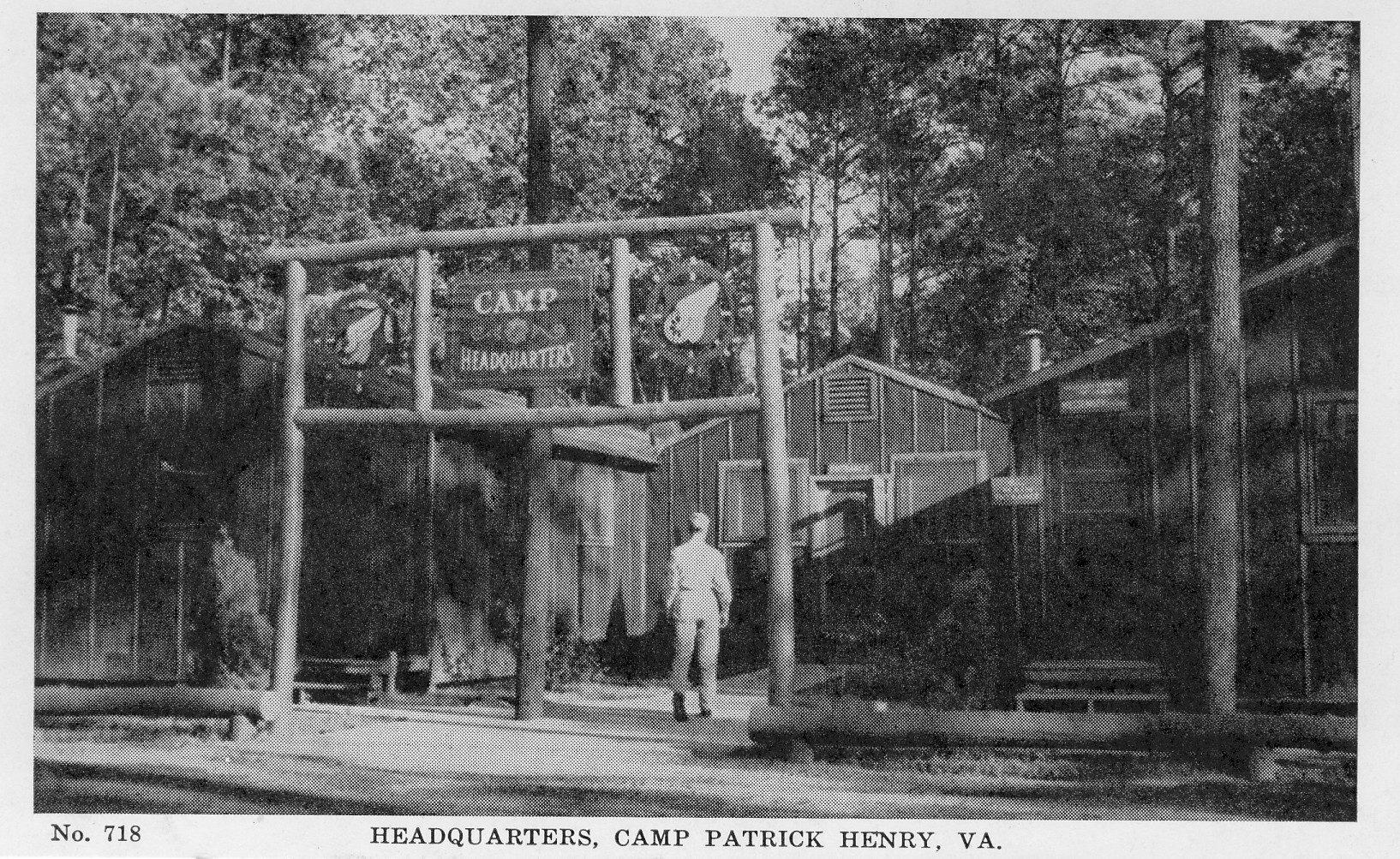
Camp Headquarters

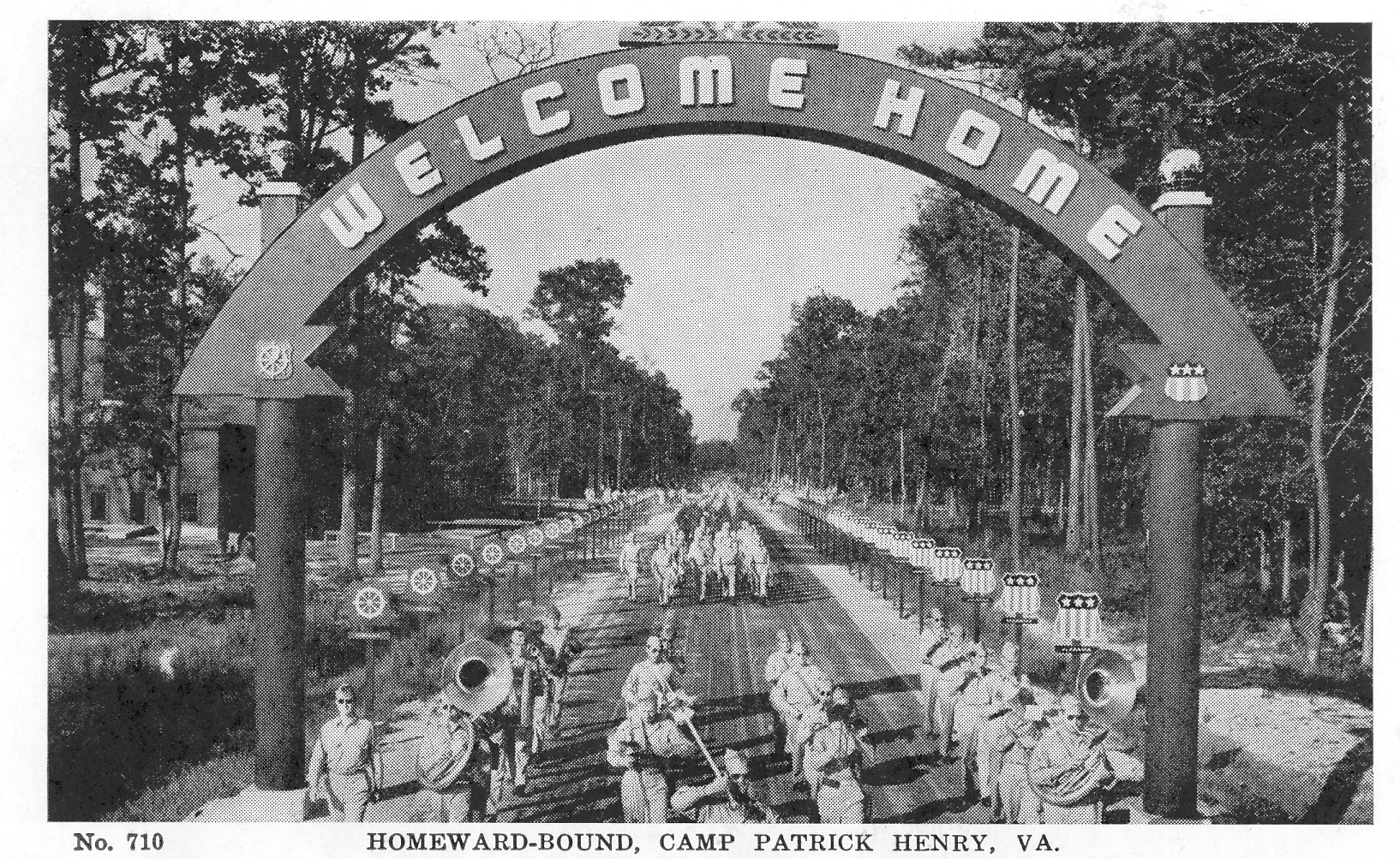
469th Army Service Force Band

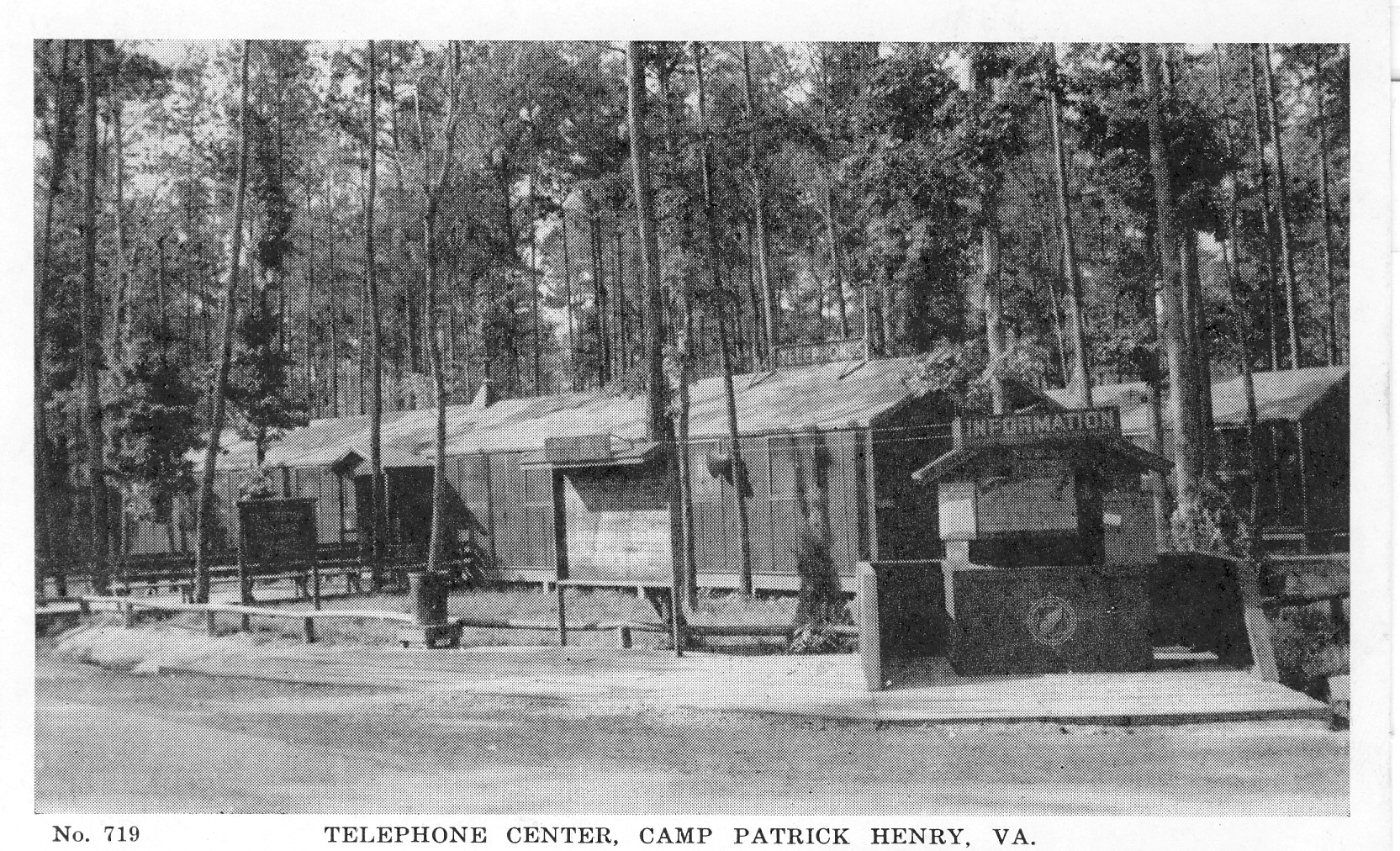
Telephone Center, Area 6

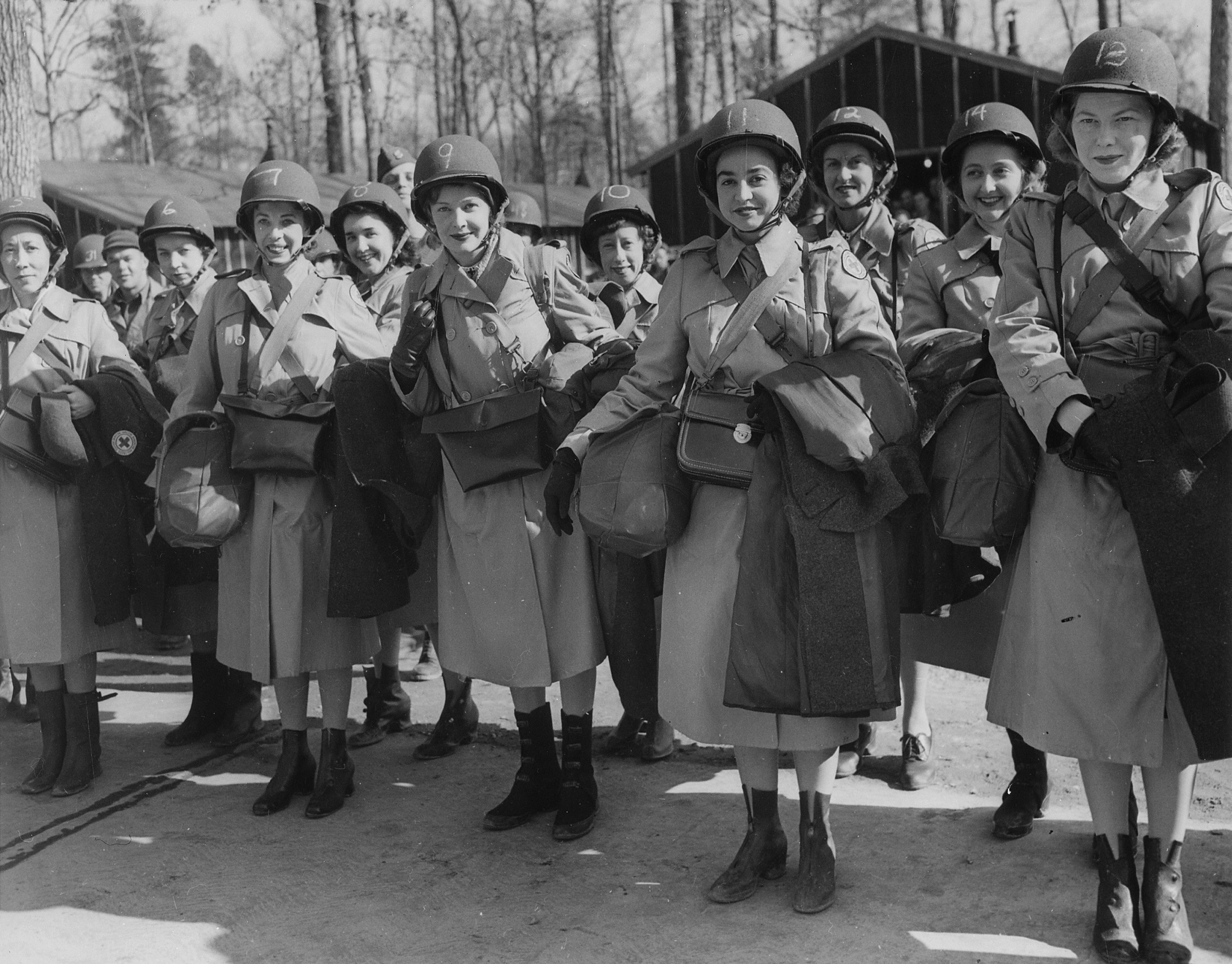
Red Cross workers assembled at the IP

== Prisoners of war ==
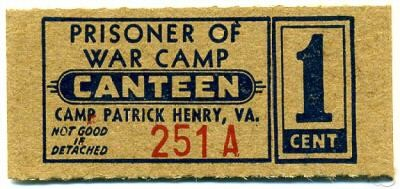
CPH POW Canteen Coupon

Camp Patrick Henry also served as a prisoner of war camp, housing over 5,000 German and Italian prisoners of war between 1944 and 1945. The prisoners were assigned to alleviate the critical shortage of manpower in the area within the limits of the Geneva Convention. The first German prisoners of war permanently assigned to the Port of Hampton Roads were members of the Afrika Korps who had been captured in early 1943 in North Africa. A prisoner-of-war canteen was established within the compound where the prisoners, within existing regulations, could make limited purchases.

== Cold War ==
After the war, the camp was deactivated and about 925 acres (3.74 km^{2}) were ceded to the Peninsula Airport Commission to build a regional airport on the site. Patrick Henry Field, which later became Newport News/Williamsburg International Airport opened in 1949. The U.S. Army continued to operate a Nike Missile site, designated N-85, on the complex until the late 1970s, when the base was shut down permanently.

== Today ==
A historical marker in front of the current terminal of Newport News/Williamsburg International Airport marks the site of the camp.

The marker has the following text on it:

Title: Camp Patrick Henry Dec. 1, 1942 – Jan. 31, 1945

Location: Newport News Williamsburg International Airport, Newport News, Virginia

Description: "Named for Virginia patriot - orator Patrick Henry (1736–1799). An Army base of 1,700 acres (6.9 km^{2}) of Peninsula woodland became a World War II staging area of 35,000 personnel capacity with shuttle rail service to shipside. A key component of the vital Hampton Roads Port of Embarkation. Almost a million and a half people were processed through this camp. After deactivation, the land was sold in 1949 for community development."
