= 776th Expeditionary Airlift Squadron =

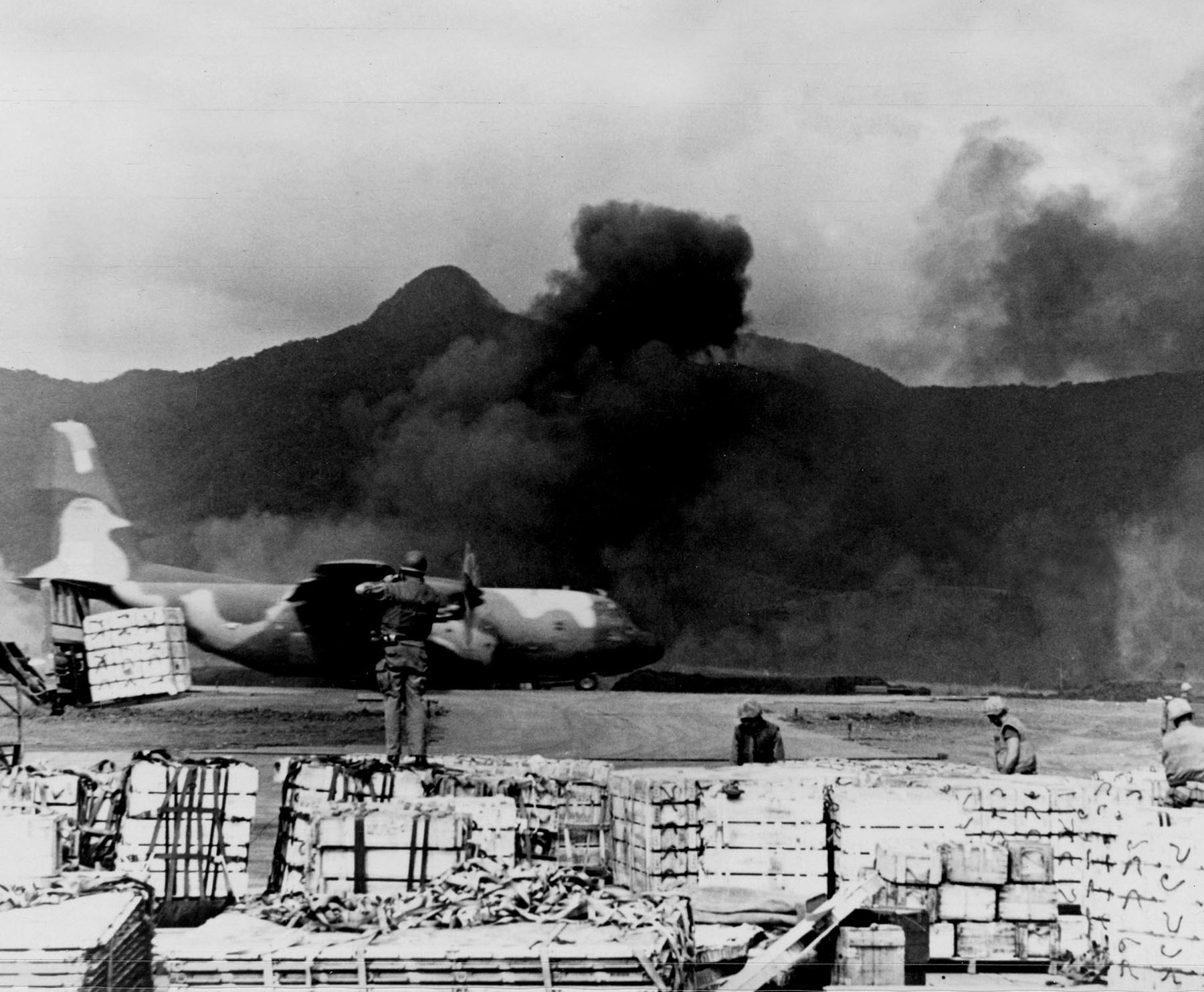
- 776th TAS C-130 Hercules departing from Khe Sanh Combat Base 1968
- Active: 1943–1945; 1953–1975
- Country: United States
- Branch: United States Air Force
- Role: Airlift
- Motto: King Of Them All
- Engagements: Mediterranean Theater of Operations; Vietnam War; Operation Enduring Freedom; Operation Iraqi Freedom; War in Afghanistan (2001–2021)
- Decorations: Distinguished Unit Citation; Air Force Outstanding Unit Award with Combat "V" Device; Air Force Outstanding Unit Award; Vietnamese Gallantry Cross with Palm

Insignia
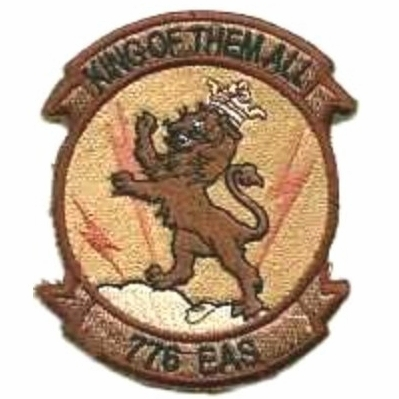
- 776th Expeditionary Airlift Squadron emblem

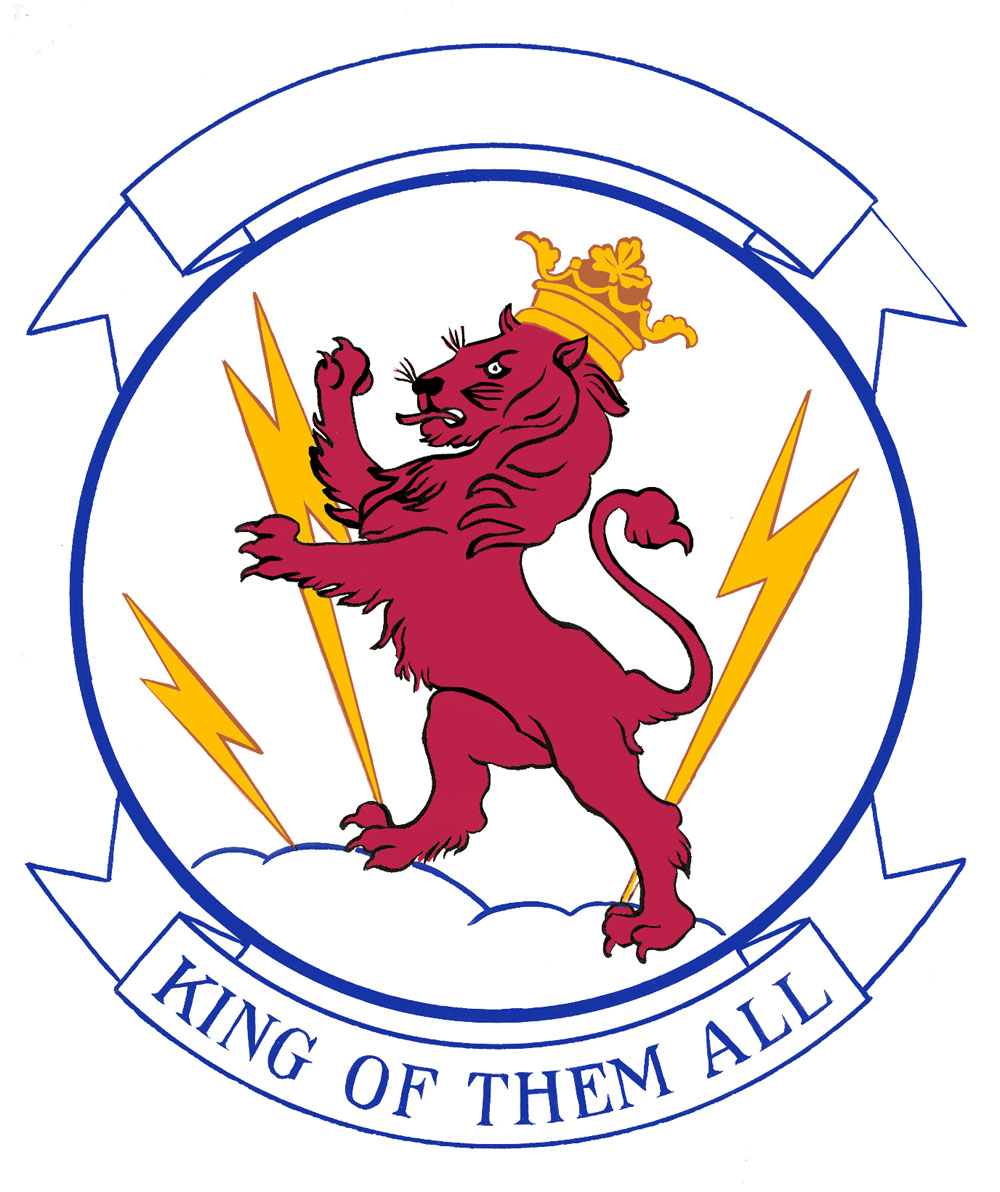
- 776th Tactical Airlift Squadron emblem (Note: Approved, 9 July 1959. Description: On a white disc edged Air Force blue, a white cloud formation issuing from base, edged Air Force blue; issuing from cloud and radiating to chief, three Air Force golden yellow lightning flashes edged gold brown, two in dexter, one in sinister; all surmounted buy a red lion rampant, outlines and details black, wearing an Air Force golden yellow crown, outlines and details golden brown.)

The 776th Expeditionary Airlift Squadron is a provisional United States Air Force squadron activated after 11 September 2001, being engaged in the global war on terrorism. Its current status is not publicly known.

The squadron was first active during World War II as the 776th Bombardment Squadron. The squadron flew Consolidated B-24 Liberators in the Mediterranean Theater of Operations, earning two Distinguished Unit Citations for its actions. Following the war, the squadron helped transport troops back to the United States.

The squadron was reactivated in 1953 as the 776th Troop Carrier Squadron, when it replaced the 71st Troop Carrier Squadron, a reserve unit that had been called to active duty for the Korean War at Lawson Air Force Base, Georgia. It moved to Pope Air Force Base, North Carolina, where it successively flew Fairchild C-119 Flying Boxcars and Fairchild C-123 Providers. It deployed to Vietnam as part of Project Mule Train, until transferring its deployed crews and planes to the 310th Troop Carrier Squadron in 1963. Upon its return to Pope, it converted to Lockheed C-130 Hercules aircraft. It moved to the Pacific and again provided airlift support in Southeast Asia until inactivating in October 1975.

== History ==
=== World War II ===
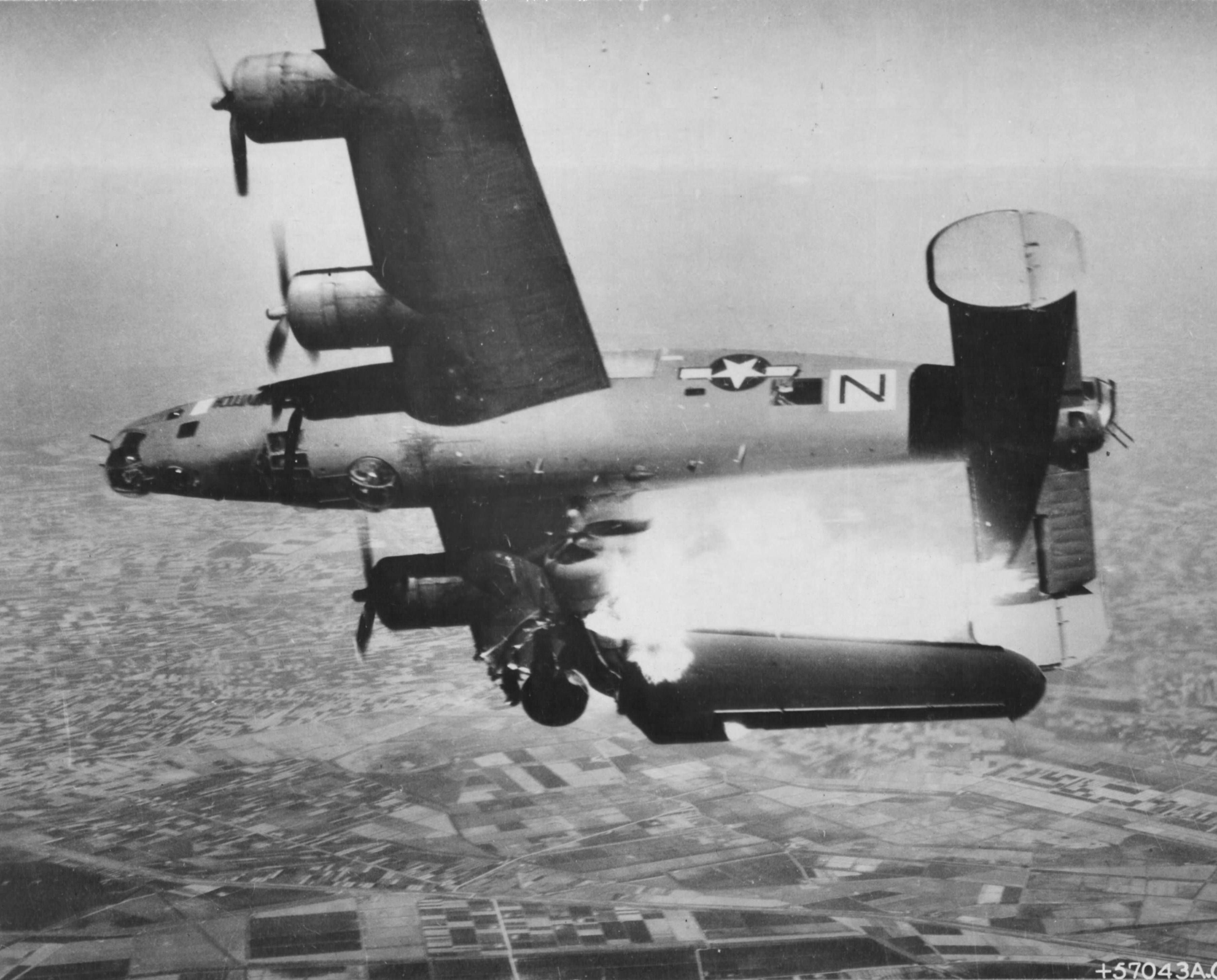
464th B-24 hit by Flak

The 776th Bombardment Squadron was activated on 1 August 1943 at Wendover Field, Utah as a Consolidated B-24 Liberator heavy bombardment unit. The squadron was one of the 464th Bombardment Group's four original squadrons, After gathering its initial cadre, the squadron moved to Gowen Field, Idaho for training with II Bomber Command. After training in Idaho and Utah, the squadron began its move to the Mediterranean Theater of Operations in February 1944.

The 776th deployed to southern Italy in February 1944, where it became part of Fifteenth Air Force's 55th Bombardment Wing. The air echelon trained for a few weeks in Tunisia before joining the remainder of the group in Italy and entering combat in April.

The group engaged in long range strategic bombing missions to enemy military, industrial and transportation targets in Italy, France, Germany, Austria, Hungary, Romania, and Yugoslavia, bombing railroad marshaling yards, oil refineries, airdrome installations, heavy industry, and other strategic objectives.

Notable missions of the Oil Campaign of World War II included Operation Tidal Wave, bombing of the Concordia Vega Refinery near Ploiești on 18 May 1944, the marshaling yards and oil refinery at Vienna on 8 July 1944, for which the squadron was awarded the Distinguished Unit Citation, and the Pardubice oil refinery and nearby railroad tracks on 24 August 1944, for which it also was awarded a Distinguished Unit Citation.

The squadron sometimes engaged in air support and air interdiction operations. It supported Allied forces during Operation Dragoon, the invasion of Southern France, in August 1944. It hit railroad centers to assist the advance of the Red Army in southeastern Europe in March 1945. It bombed enemy supply lines to assist Operation Grapeshot, the advance of the US Fifth and British Eighth Army in northern Italy in April 1945.

After V-E Day, the squadron was assigned to the Green Project, the movement of troops from Europe to the United States via the South Atlantic Transport Route. B-24s were modified with sealed bomb bays, removal of all defensive armament and internal fuselage equipped with seating to carry approximately 30 personnel. It was assigned to Air Transport Command (ATC) at Waller Field, Trinidad. The group moved personnel from Natal, Brazil and Atkinson Field, British Guiana to Morrison Field, Florida. It provided air transport until the end of July when the unit was inactivated and its personnel assigned to elements of the South Atlantic and Caribbean Wings of ATC.

=== Replacement of reserve wing ===
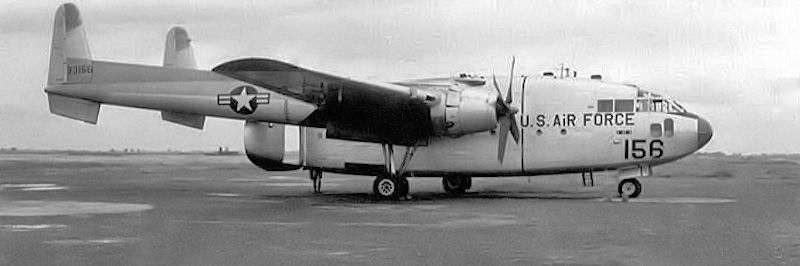
Fairchild C-119G Flying Boxcar

The squadron was redesignated the 776th Troop Carrier Squadron and activated at Lawson Air Force Base, Georgia on 1 February 1953. The squadron replaced the 71st Troop Carrier Squadron, a reserve unit that had been called to active duty for the Korean War with its parent 434th Troop Carrier Wing. The 434th Wing was in the process of transitioning from the Curtiss C-46 Commando to the Fairchild C-119 Flying Boxcar when the squadron took over the personnel and aircraft of the 71st. In September 1954, the squadron moved to Pope Air Force Base, North Carolina where it was colocated with the Army's 82d Airborne Division at Fort Bragg.

The unit provided tactical airlift of troops and cargo, participated in joint airborne training with Army forces, and took part in tactical exercises in the United States and overseas. The squadron provided aeromedical airlift and flew humanitarian missions as required.

=== Assault operations and early Vietnam support ===
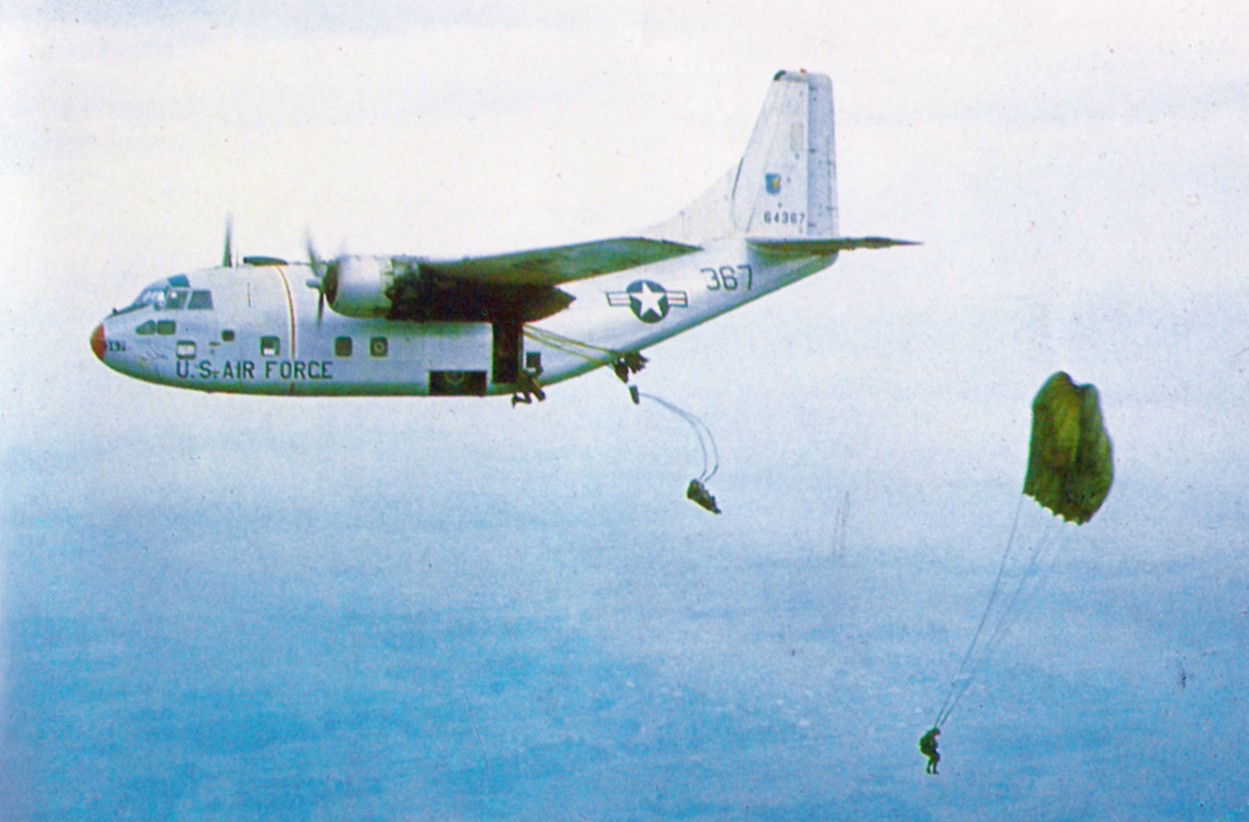
464th Provider dropping Vietnamese paratroopers (Note: Aircraft is Fairchild C-123B-FA Provider, Serial 56-4367. This plane belly-landed at Tau Tieng after being hit by small arms fire on 26 November 1966. The photo identification states it was taken during a training exercise in April 1966, but the lack of camouflage, command emblem on the tail and identification as an aircraft of the 464th Wing all indicate it was taken much earlier.)

In November 1957, the 464th Troop Carrier Wing converted to the dual deputy organization. The wing's 464th Troop Carrier Group was inactivated, and the squadron was assigned directly to the wing. The squadron, meanwhile, began trading its C-119s for Fairchild C-123 Providers before the end of the year.

Starting in 1962, the Air Force had been providing airlift support in Vietnam with Providers under Project Mule Train. The operation had grown to the size of three squadrons by the summer of 1963, mostly supported by deployed aircraft and crews from the 464th Wing. When the Air Force decided to replace deployed units with regular units, deployed crews and airplanes at Tan Son Nhut Airport were assigned to the 776th, which was reassigned to the 315th Troop Carrier Group there. Seven days later, these crews and their aircraft became the newly-activated 310th Troop Carrier Squadron, and the 776th was returned to the control of the 464th Wing. However, on the day of its return, it became a medium troop carrier squadron and began transitioning into the Lockheed C-130 Hercules.

=== C-130 Hercules operations ===
In 1964, the Simba rebellion began in the Congo and rebels gained control of large areas of the eastern part of the country, including Stanleyville and the United States consulate there, taking several State Department employees and others captive. The United States set up a Joint Task Force, which included four C-130s of the 464th Wing to rescue State Department employees in Stanleyville. The Wing's commitment increased to 14 aircraft with the development of an expanded rescue plan called Operation Dragon Rouge. These aircraft, some from the 776th Squadron, were on rotation duty with the 322d Air Division at Evreux Air Base, France and were conveniently located to airlift Belgian forces. The wing dropped Belgian paratroops into Stanleyville, and after the runways were cleared, landed additional troops at Simi-Simi Airport. Once the city was secured, the C-130s began shuttling refugees out of the city, under fire as they departed, and with 100 passengers on each plane. Five aircraft were damaged as 2,000 refugees were evacuated. (Note: Haulman gives the number of evacuees at 1200. Haulman, p. 58.) An additional 500–1000 were evacuated from Paulis in a follow-on operation, (Note: Haulman's total rescued from Paulis is 520, although it is not clear that the wing participated in more than 270 of these rescues. Haulman, p. 58.) although not all hostages could be rescued and a number were executed by the Simba rebels. The 464th Wing received the Mackay Trophy for this operation.

In March 1965, the squadron participated in Operation Steep Hill XIII to protect Alabama citizens during the civil rights march from Selma to Montgomery. In April 1965, the United States decided to deploy troops to the Dominican Republic following the start of a civil war there. on 30 April, the wing airlanded the 3rd Brigade of the 82d Airborne Division at San Isidro Air Base. The 46 aircraft dispatched to San Isidro so overcrowded the field that many were unable to unload and some had to be diverted to Ramey Air Force Base, Puerto Rico. (Note: The original destination of the force had been Ramey, with an airdrop north of San Isidro. These plans were changed after the force was already in the air. Greenberg, p. 38.) The following day, "an air bridge was established between Pope and San Isidro . . . with a transport . . . landing on an average . . . once every five minutes." (Note: This included other troop carrier units. President Lyndon Johnson had directed that all USAF forces not supporting the war in Southeast Asia be made available to support the operation. Greenberg, p. 44.) In late May, the operation in the Dominican Republic came under the aegis of the Organization of American States and American planes flew in the first Latin American troops.

=== Pacific Air Forces ===
While the squadron supported Operation Power Pack, it was also rotating crews for missions in Southeast Asia. It moved to Tachikawa Air Base, Japan on 26 December 1965 to augment the airlift operations of the 315th Air Division, the manager of airlift operations for Pacific Air Forces. At the end of March 1966, it was assigned to the 314th Troop Carrier Wing and joined the wing at Ching Chuan Kang Air Base, Taiwan on 1 April.

The squadron conducted combat airlift into Vietnam, transporting troops, equipment, and supplies to various bases in Southeast Asia. Squadron crews rotated to Cam Ranh Bay Air Base and Tan Son Nhut Airport to fly missions. In January 1967 it participated in Operation Junction City. It flew shuttle missions to Bangkok and Tuy Hoa.

In 1968 the squadron supported the Siege of Khe Sahn, and Operation Delaware and the A Shau Valley campaign. It also supported, Operation Banish Beach. In 1969, Operations Commando Twist and Commando Image and operations at Katum, Bu Prang and An Hua. In 1971 it supported Operation Lam Son 719 and Lam Son 720. At the end of May 1971, the 314th Tactical Airlift Wing moved without personnel to Little Rock Air Force Base to replace the 64th Tactical Airlift Wing there, while its personnel and equipment were transferred to the 374th Tactical Airlift Wing, which moved on paper from Naha Air Base.

In 1973 it participated in the Battle of An Lộc, Republic of Vietnam (Easter Airlift). Squadron detachments operated From Tan Son Nhut, U-Tapao Royal Thai Navy Airfield, and Nakhon Phanom Royal Thai Navy Base, Thailand. On 28 January 1973 a crew from the squadron and a crew from the 345th Tactical Airlift Squadron flew into Hanoi to bring a North Vietnamese delegation back to Tan Son Nhut Airport near Saigon. In November 1973, the 374th Wing and the squadron moved to Clark Air Base in the Philippines.

As Saigon fell in April 1975, the squadron airlifted Vietnamese orphans from the city during Operation Baby Lift. On 29 April 1975 a C-130 with a crew from the 776th was hit by rocket/mortar fire, causing the aircraft to catch fire while taxiing to pick up passengers for evacuation. This event essentially ended the fixed wing air evacuation. The crew evacuated the aircraft and joined the only other plane at the airport, flown by a 21st Tactical Airlift Squadron aircrew. This departing flight was the last fixed wing aircraft to leave carrying refugees out of Tan Son Nhut as Saigon was being overrun by the North Vietnamese. The squadron was inactivated in July 1975.

=== Twenty-first Century ===
The squadron was re-activated as a provisional C-130 Hercules expeditionary airlift unit in 2002. Based at PAF Base Shahbaz, Jacobabad, Pakistan and participated in the War in Afghanistan (2001-2021) and the Iraq War (U.S. involvement phase, 2003-10).

== Lineage ==
- Constituted as the 776th Bombardment Squadron (Heavy) on 19 May 1943

Activated on 1 August 1943
Redesignated 776th Bombardment Squadron, Heavy on 29 September 1944

- Inactivated on 31 July 1945

Redesignated 776th Bombardment Squadron, Very Heavy on 14 November 1945 (Remained inactive)
Redesignated 776th Troop Carrier Squadron, Medium on 15 December 1952

- Activated on 1 February 1953

Redesignated 776th Troop Carrier Squadron, Assault on 1 December 1958
Redesignated 776th Troop Carrier Squadron, Medium on 8 July 1963
Redesignated 776th Troop Carrier Squadron on 1 January 1967
Redesignated 776th Tactical Airlift Squadron on 1 August 1967
Inactivated 1 October 1975

- Converted to provisional status and redesignated 776th Expeditionary Airlift Squadron on 3 May 2002

=== Assignments ===
- 464th Bombardment Group, 1 August 1943 – 31 July 1945
- 464th Troop Carrier Group, 1 February 1953 (attached to 60th Troop Carrier Wing 28 October 1954 – 1 May 1955)
- 464th Troop Carrier Wing, 11 November 1957
- 315th Troop Carrier Group, 1 July 1963
- 464th Troop Carrier Wing, 8 July 1963
- 315th Air Division, 26 December 1965
- 314th Troop Carrier Wing (later 314th Tactical Airlift Wing), 25 March 1966
- 374th Tactical Airlift Wing, 31 May 1971 – 31 October 1975
- Air Combat Command to activate or inactivate as needed at any time after 3 May 2002

=== Stations ===
- Wendover Field, Utah, 1 August 1943
- Gowen Field, Idaho, 22 August 1943
- Pocatello Army Air Field, Idaho, 22 October 1943 – 9 February 1944
- Pantanella Airfield, Italy, 10 April 1944
- Gioia del Colle Airfield, Italy, 20 April 1944
- Pantanella Airfield, Italy, c. 1 June 1944 – c. 6 June 1945
- Waller Field, Trinidad, 15 June–31 July 1945
- Lawson Air Force Base, Georgia, 1 February 1953
- Pope Air Force Base, North Carolina, 16 September 1954
- Tan Son Nhut Airport, South Vietnam, 1 July 1963
- Pope Air Force Base, North Carolina, 8 July 1963
- Tachikawa Air Base, Japan, 26 December 1965
- Ching Chuan Kang Air Base, Taiwan, 1 April 1966
- Clark Air Base, Philippines, 15 November 1973 – 31 October 1975

=== Aircraft ===
- Consolidated B-24 Liberator, 1943–1945
- Curtiss C-46 Commando, 1953–1954
- Fairchild C-119 Flying Boxcar, 1953–1958
- Fairchild C-123 Provider, 1958–1965
- Lockheed C-130 Hercules, 1964–1975

=== Awards and campaigns ===
Award streamer	Award	Dates	Notes
	Distinguished Unit Citation	8 July 1944	Vienna, Austria, 776th Bombardment Squadron
	Distinguished Unit Citation	24 August 1944	Pardubice, Czechoslovakia, 776th Bombardment Squadron
	Air Force Outstanding Unit Award with Combat "V" Device	1 November 1967-31 December 1969	776th Tactical Airlift Squadron
	Air Force Outstanding Unit Award with Combat "V" Device	12 February 1975-17 May 1975	776th Tactical Airlift Squadron
	Air Force Outstanding Unit Award	28 November 1961-1 May 1963	776th Troop Carrier Squadron
	Republic of Vietnam Gallantry Cross with Palm	1 November 1967-31 December 1969	776th Tactical Airlift Squadron
	Philippine Presidential Unit Citation	21 July 1972-15 August 1972	776th Tactical Airlift Squadron

Campaign Streamer	Campaign	Dates	Notes
	Rome-Arno	10 April 1944 – 9 September 1944	776th Bombardment Squadron
	Southern France	15 August 1944 – 14 September 1944	776th Bombardment Squadron
	Northern France	25 July 1944 – 14 September 1944	776th Bombardment Squadron
	North Apennines	10 September 1944 – 4 April 1945	776th Bombardment Squadron
	Po Valley	3 April 1945 – 8 May 1945	776th Bombardment Squadron
	Vietnam Advisory	28 November 1961 – 8 July 1963	776th Troop Carrier Squadron
