= 778th Expeditionary Airlift Squadron =

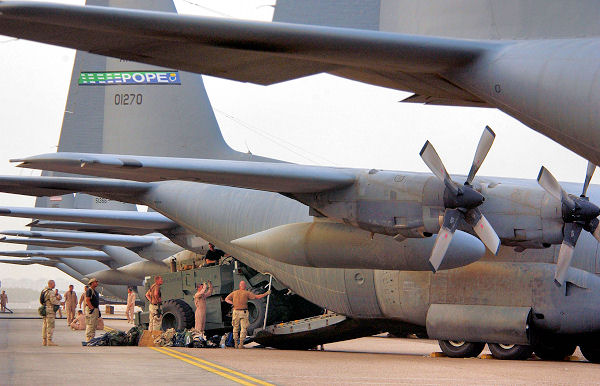
- Members of the 778th Expeditionary Airlift Squadron and 621st Air Mobility Group load a forklift onto a C-130 Hercules in support of Operation Iraqi Freedom
- Active: 1943–1945; 1953–1971; After 2002
- Country: United States
- Branch: United States Air Force
- Role: Airlift
- Mottos: Perditam Selinuntem Liberare (Latin for 'Ready for Difficult Missions') (1958-unknown); Guarding Global Liberty
- Engagements: Mediterranean Theater of Operations
- Decorations: Distinguished Unit Citation; Air Force Outstanding Unit Award

Insignia
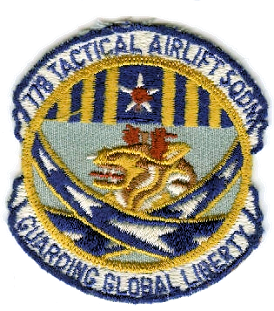
- Patch with 778th Tactical Airlift Squadron emblem

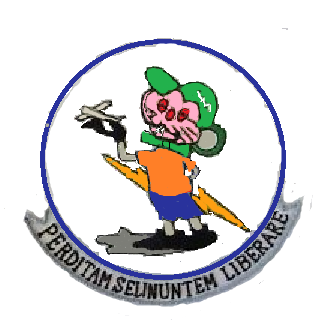
- 778th Troop Carrier Squadron emblem (Note: Approved 17 April 1958. Description: On a white disc edged Air Force blue, a happy caricatured white mouse with pink mouth, red nose and eyes, black markings, outlines and details, dressed in orange shirt and Air Force blue knee pants, with green necktie and green visored cap adorned with a white lightning flash; his gloves and shoes black; a silver gray aircraft held high in his right hand and an Air Force golden yellow lightning flash in his left hand; a silver gray shadow around his feet.)

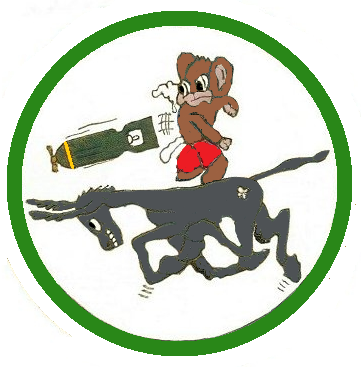
- Patch with 778th Bombardment Squadron emblem
- Tail Code 1968–1971: PG

The 778th Expeditionary Airlift Squadron is a provisional United States Air Force squadron activated after 3 May 2002, being engaged in the global war on terrorism. Its current status is undetermined.

The squadron was first active during World War II as the 778th Bombardment Squadron. The squadron flew Consolidated B-24 Liberators in the Mediterranean Theater of Operations, earning two Distinguished Unit Citations for its actions. Following the war, the squadron helped transport troops back to the United States.

The squadron was reactivated in 1953 as the 778th Troop Carrier Squadron, when it replaced the 73d Troop Carrier Squadron, a reserve unit that had been called to active duty for the Korean War at Lawson Air Force Base, Georgia. It moved to Pope Air Force Base, North Carolina, where it successively flew Fairchild C-119 Flying Boxcars and Fairchild C-123 Providers. It converted to Lockheed C-130 Hercules aircraft. It frequently deployed to other theaters, and participated in Operation Dragon Rouge and Operation Power Pack. It was inactivated on 31 August 1971, when the 40th Tactical Airlift Squadron replaced it at Pope.

== History ==
=== World War II ===
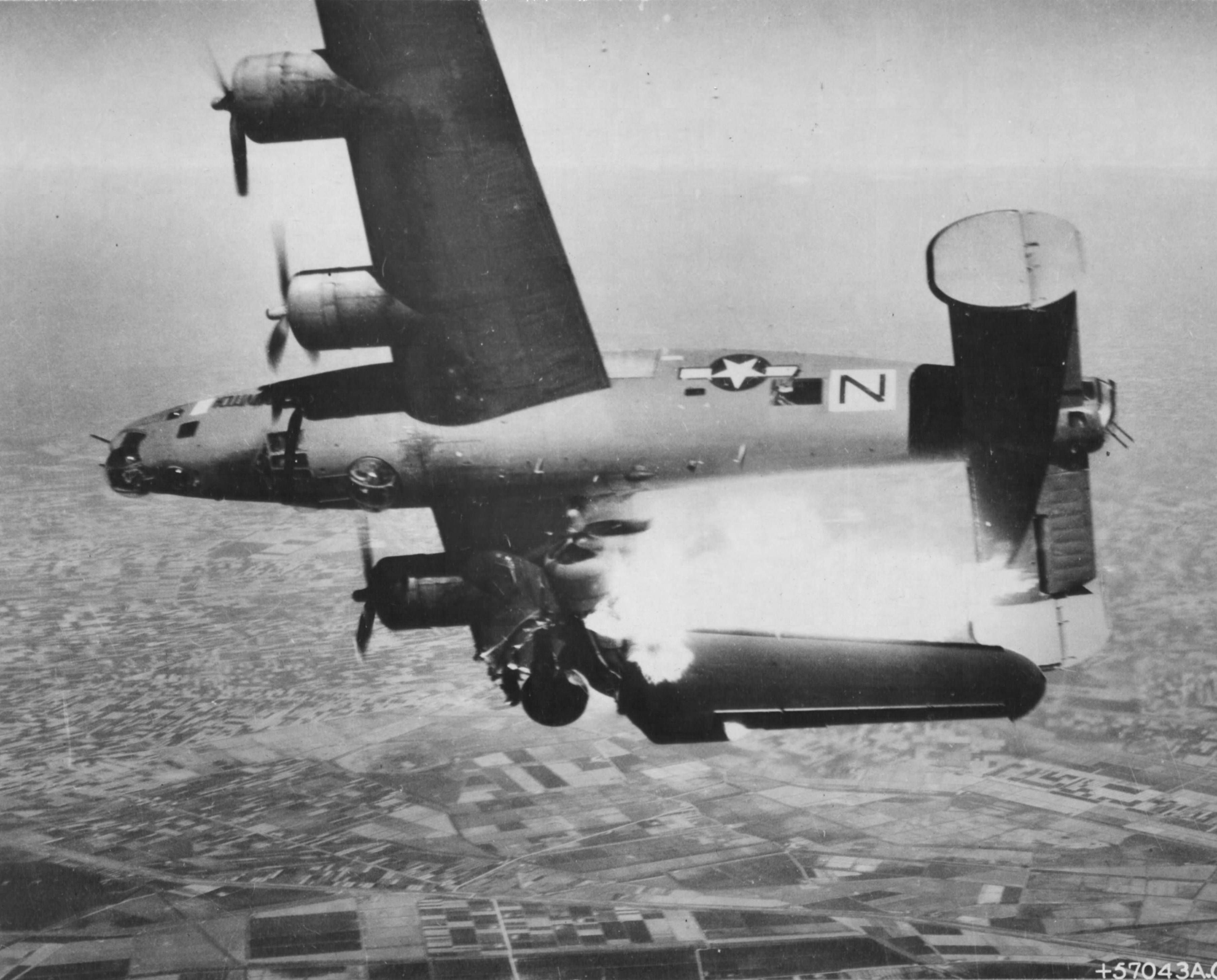
464th B-24 hit by Flak

The 778th Bombardment Squadron was activated on 1 August 1943 at Wendover Field, Utah as a Consolidated B-24 Liberator heavy bombardment unit. The squadron was one of the 464th Group's four original squadrons, After gathering its initial cadre, the squadron moved to Gowen Field, Idaho for training with II Bomber Command. After training in Idaho and Utah, the squadron began its move to the Mediterranean Theater of Operations in February 1944.

The 778th deployed to southern Italy in February 1944, where it became part of Fifteenth Air Force's 55th Bombardment Wing. The air echelon trained for a few weeks in Tunisia before joining the remainder of the group in Italy and entering combat in April.

The group engaged in long range strategic bombing missions to enemy military, industrial and transportation targets in Italy, France, Germany, Austria, Hungary, Romania, and Yugoslavia, bombing railroad marshaling yards, oil refineries, airdrome installations, heavy industry, and other strategic objectives.

Notable missions of the Oil Campaign of World War II included Operation Tidal Wave, bombing of the Concordia Vega Refinery near Ploiești on 18 May 1944, the marshaling yards and oil refinery at Vienna on 8 July 1944, for which the squadron was awarded the Distinguished Unit Citation, and the Pardubice oil refinery and nearby railroad tracks on 24 August 1944, for which it also was awarded a Distinguished Unit Citation.

The squadron sometimes engaged in support and interdiction operations. It supported Allied forces during Operation Dragoon, the invasion of Southern France in August 1944. It hit railroad centers to assist the advance of the Red Army in southeastern Europe in March 1945. It bombed enemy supply lines to assist the advance of the US Fifth and British Eighth Army in northern Italy in April 1945.

After V-E Day, the squadron was assigned to the Green Project, the movement of troops from Europe to the United States via the South Atlantic Transport Route. B-24s were modified with sealed bomb bays, removal of all defensive armament and internal fuselage equipped with seating to carry approximately 30 personnel. It was assigned to Air Transport Command (ATC) at Waller Field, Trinidad. The group moved personnel from Natal, Brazil and Atkinson Field, British Guiana to Morrison Field, Florida. It provided air transport until the end of July when the unit was inactivated, and its personnel transferred to elements of the South Atlantic and Caribbean Wings of ATC.

=== Replacement of reserve wing ===
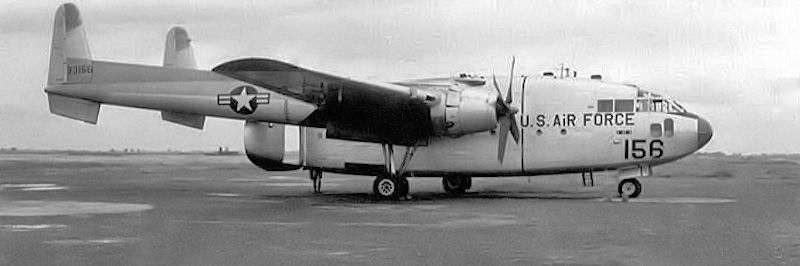
Fairchild C-119G Flying Boxcar

The squadron was reactivated as the 778th Troop Carrier Squadron and activated at Lawson Air Force Base, Georgia on 1 February 1953. The squadron replaced the 73d Troop Carrier Squadron, a reserve unit that had been called to active duty for the Korean War with its parent 434th Troop Carrier Wing. The 434th Wing was in the process of transitioning from the Curtiss C-46 Commando to the Fairchild C-119 Flying Boxcar when the squadron took over the personnel and aircraft of the 73d. In September 1954, the squadron moved to Pope Air Force Base, North Carolina where it was colocated with the Army's 82d Airborne Division at Fort Bragg.

The unit provided tactical airlift of troops and cargo, participated in joint airborne training with Army forces, and took part in tactical exercises in the United States and overseas. The squadron provided aeromedical airlift and flew humanitarian missions as required.

=== Assault operations and early Vietnam support ===
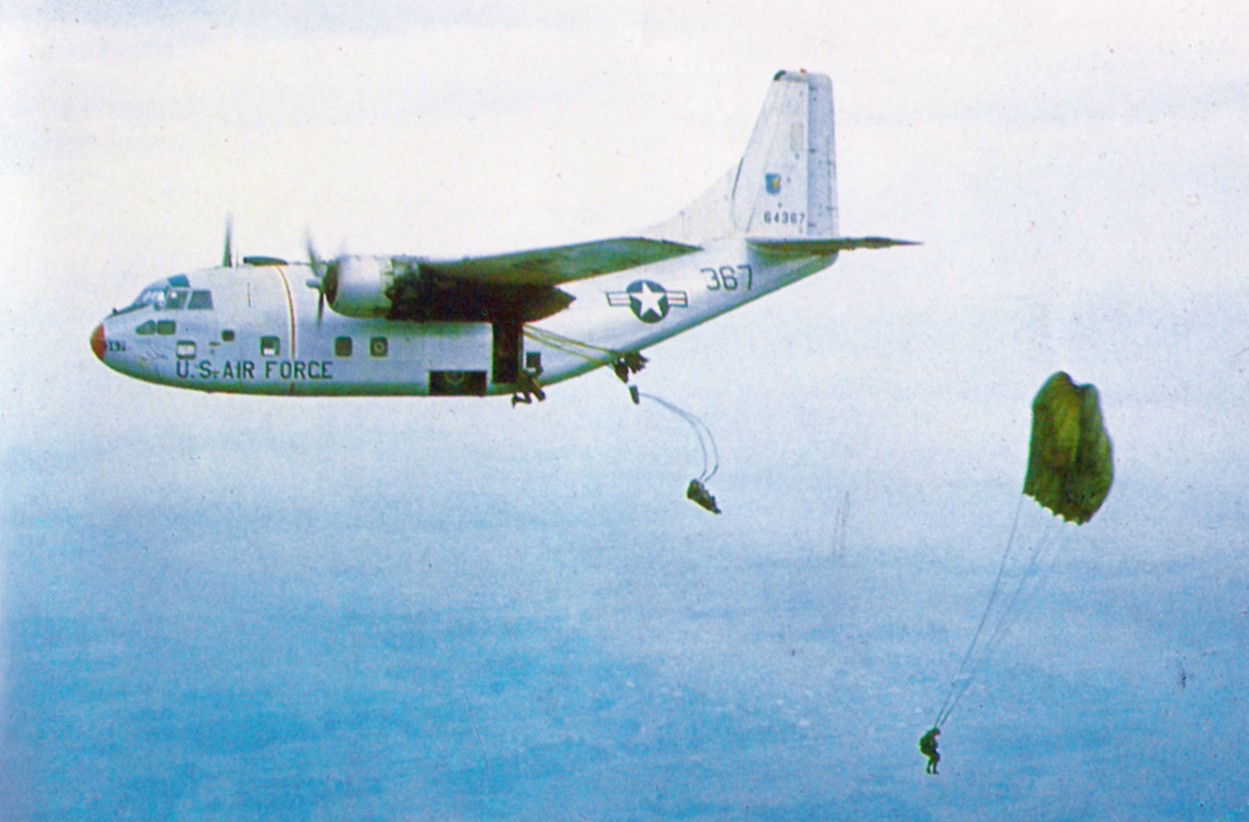
464th Wing C-123B Provider (Note: The aircraft is Fairchild C-123B serial 56-64367. The photograph is identified as being taken in Vietnam in 1966. However, the wing units' deployments to Vietnam were earlier. By 1966, C-123s in Vietnam were assigned to the 315th Air Commando Wing and were camouflaged.)

In November 1957, the 464th Troop Carrier Wing converted to the dual deputy organization. The wing's 464th Troop Carrier Group was inactivated, and the squadron was assigned directly to the wing. The squadron, meanwhile, began trading its C-119s for Fairchild C-123 Providers before the end of the year. The squadron continued airlift support missions with its providers until January 1964, when it began converting to the Lockheed C-130 Hercules

=== C-130 Hercules operations ===
In 1964, the Simba rebellion began in the Congo and rebels gained control of large areas of the eastern part of the country, including Stanleyville and the United States consulate there, taking several State Department employees and others captive. The United States set up a Joint Task Force, which included four C-130s of the 464th Wing to rescue State Department employees in Stanleyville. The Wing's commitment increased to 14 aircraft with the development of an expanded rescue plan called Operation Dragon Rouge. These aircraft and crews were on rotation duty with the 322d Air Division at Evreux Air Base, France and were conveniently located to airlift Belgian forces. The wing dropped Belgian paratroops into Stanleyville, and after the runways were cleared, landed additional troops at Simi-Simi Airport. Once the city was secured, The C-130s began shuttling refugees out of the city, under fire as they departed, and with 100 passengers on each plane. Five aircraft were damaged as 2,000 refugees were evacuated. (Note: Haulman gives the number of evacuees at 1200. Haulman, p. 58.) An additional 500–1000 were evacuated from Paulis in a follow-on operation, (Note: Haulman's total rescued from Paulis is 520, although it is not clear that the wing participated in more than 270 of these rescues. Haulman, p. 58.) although not all hostages could be rescued and a number were executed by the Simba rebels. The 464th Wing received the Mackay Trophy for this operation.

In April 1965, the United States decided to deploy troops to the Dominican Republic following the start of a civil war there. on 30 April, aircraft of the 464th Wing airlanded the 3rd Brigade of the 82d Airborne Division at San Isidro Air Base. The 46 aircraft dispatched to San Isidro so overcrowded the field that many were unable to unload and some had to be diverted to Ramey Air Force Base, Puerto Rico. (Note: The original destination of the force had been Ramey, with an airdrop north of San Isidro. These plans were changed after the force was already in the air. Greenberg, p. 38.) The following day, "an air bridge was established between Pope and San Isidro . . . with a transport . . . landing on an average . . . once every five minutes." (Note: This included other troop carrier units. President Lyndon Johnson had directed that all USAF forces not supporting the war in Southeast Asia be made available to support the operation. Greenberg, p. 44.) In late May, the operation in the Dominican Republic came under the aegis of the Organization of American States and American planes flew in the first Latin American troops.

The squadron continued to perform tactical airlift missions until August 1971 when it was inactivated and its mission, personnel and equipment were absorbed by the 40th Tactical Airlift Squadron, which moved on paper from Lockbourne Air Force Base, Ohio.

=== Expeditionary operations ===
The squadron was redesignated the 778th Expeditionary Airlift Squadron, converted to provisional status, and assigned to Air Combat Command to activate or inactivate as needed. It was activated as a Lockheed C-130 Hercules airlift squadron as part of the global war on terrorism. By January 2003, the squadron was flying missions in Afghanistan with crews deployed from Little Rock Air Force Base.

== Lineage ==
- Constituted as the 778th Bombardment Squadron (Heavy) on 19 May 1943

Activated on 1 August 1943
Inactivated on 31 July 1945

- Redesignated: 778th Bombardment Squadron, Very Heavy on 14 November 1945

Redesignated: 778th Troop Carrier Squadron, Medium on 15 December 1952
Activated on 1 February 1953
Redesignated: 778th Troop Carrier Squadron, Assault on 1 December 1958
Redesignated: 778th Troop Carrier Squadron, Medium on 8 January 1964
Redesignated: 778th Troop Carrier Squadron on 1 March 1966
Redesignated: 778th Tactical Airlift Squadron on 1 May 1967
Inactivated on 31 August 1971.

- Converted to provisional status and redesignated as 778th Expeditionary Airlift Squadron on 3 May 2002

Activated by January 2003

=== Assignments ===
- 464th Bombardment Group, 1 August 1943 – 31 July 1945 (attached to Air Transport Command after 15 June 1945)
- 464th Troop Carrier Group, 1 February 1953
- 464th Troop Carrier Wing (later 464th Tactical Airlift Wing), 11 November 1957 – 31 August 1971
- Air Combat Command to activate or inactivate as needed, 3 May 2002

320th Expeditionary Operations Group, January 2003

=== Stations ===
- Wendover Field, Utah, 1 August 1943
- Gowen Field, Idaho, 22 August 1943
- Pocatello Army Air Field, Idaho, 2 October 1943 – 9 February 1944
- Pantanella Airfield, Italy, 10 April 1944
- Gioia del Colle Airfield, Italy, 20 April 1944
- Pantanella Airfield, Italy, c. 1 June 1944-c. 6 June 1945
- Waller Field, Trinidad, 15 June-31 July 1945
- Lawson Air Force Base, Georgia, 1 February 1953
- Pope Air Force Base, North Carolina, 16 September 1954 – 31 August 1971
- Unknown, January 2003

=== Aircraft ===
- Consolidated B-24 Liberator, 1943–1945
- Curtiss C-46 Commando, 1953–1954
- Fairchild C-119 Flying Boxcar, 1953–1958
- Fairchild C-123 Provider, 1958–1968
- Lockheed C-130 Hercules, 1968–1971; undetermined

=== Awards and campaigns ===
Award streamer	Award	Dates	Notes
	Distinguished Unit Citation	8 July 1944	Vienna, Austria, 778th Bombardment Squadron
	Distinguished Unit Citation	24 August 1944	Pardubice, Czechoslovakia, 778th Bombardment Squadron
	Air Force Outstanding Unit Award with Combat "V" Device	1 July 1967-30 June 1968	778th Expeditionary Airlift Squadron
	Air Force Outstanding Unit Award with Combat "V" Device	1 March 2002–31 May 2003	778th Tactical Airlift Squadron
	Air Force Outstanding Unit Award	28 November 1961-1 May 1963	778th Troop Carrier Squadron
	Vietnamese Gallantry Cross with Palm	1 July 1967-15 July 1968	778th Tactical Airlift Squadron

Campaign Streamer	Campaign	Dates	Notes
	Rome-Arno	10 April 1944 – 9 September 1944	778th Bombardment Squadron
	Southern France	15 August 1944 – 14 September 1944	778th Bombardment Squadron
	Northern France	25 July 1944 – 14 September 1944	778th Bombardment Squadron
	North Apennines	10 September 1944 – 4 April 1945	778th Bombardment Squadron
	Po Valley	3 April 1945 – 8 May 1945	778th Bombardment Squadron
	Vietnam Air Offensive, Phase III	1 April 1968 – 31 October 1968	778th Tactical Airlift Squadron
	Global War on Terror Expeditionary Medal		778th Expeditionary Airlift Squadron
