= 777th Expeditionary Airlift Squadron =

United States Air Force Air Combat Command unit

777th Expeditionary Airlift Squadron

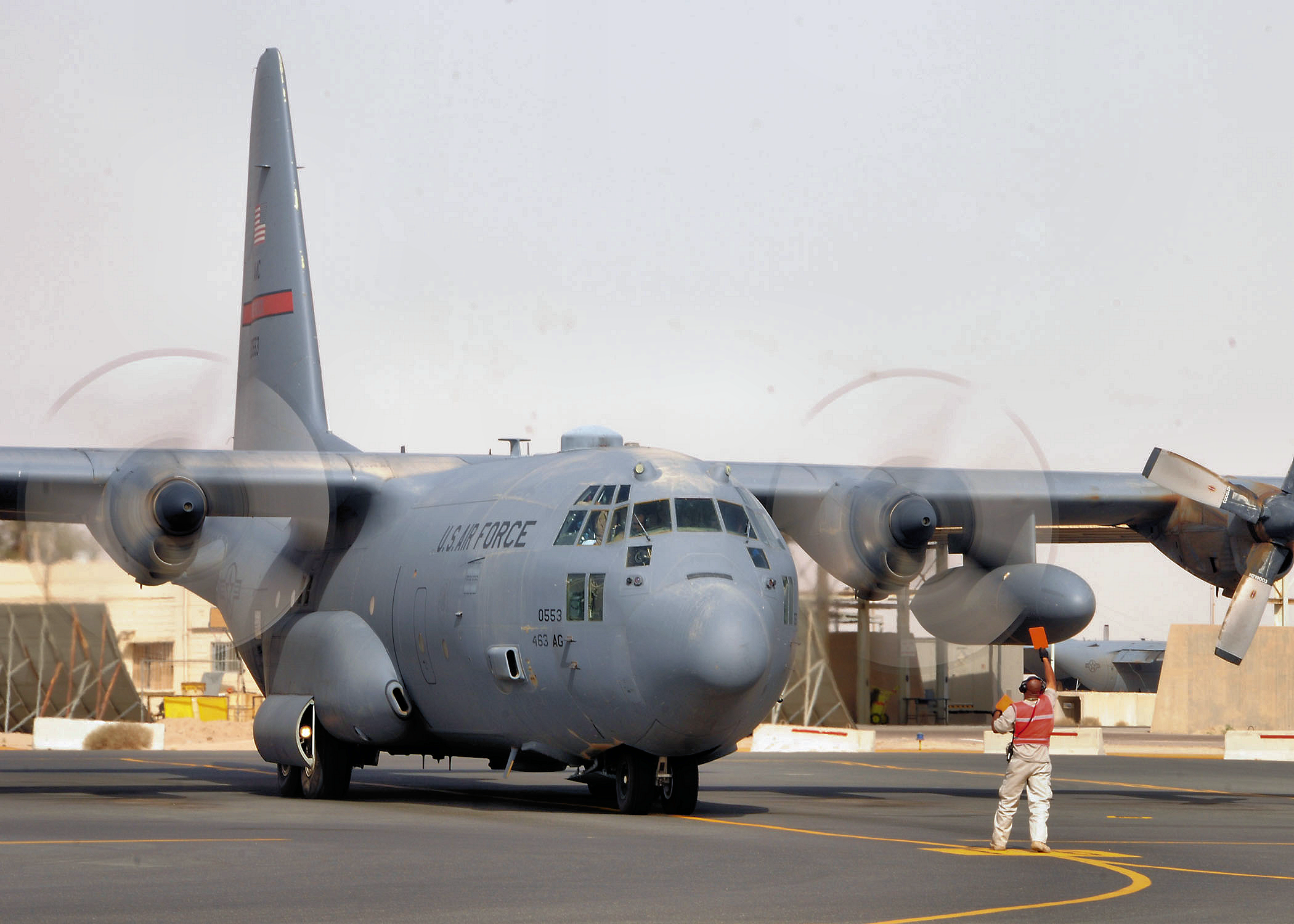
- A C-130 Hercules of the 777th Expeditionary Airlift Squadron is marshaled into position at Joint Base Balad, Iraq
- Active: 1943–1945; 1953–1971; 2003–2011
- Country: United States
- Branch: United States Air Force
- Role: Airlift
- Nicknames: Dueling Dragons, Triple Seven
- Engagements: Mediterranean Theater of Operations; Iraq War
- Decorations: Distinguished Unit Citation; Air Force Meritorious Unit Award; Air Force Outstanding Unit Award with Combat "V" Device; Air Force Outstanding Unit Award

Insignia
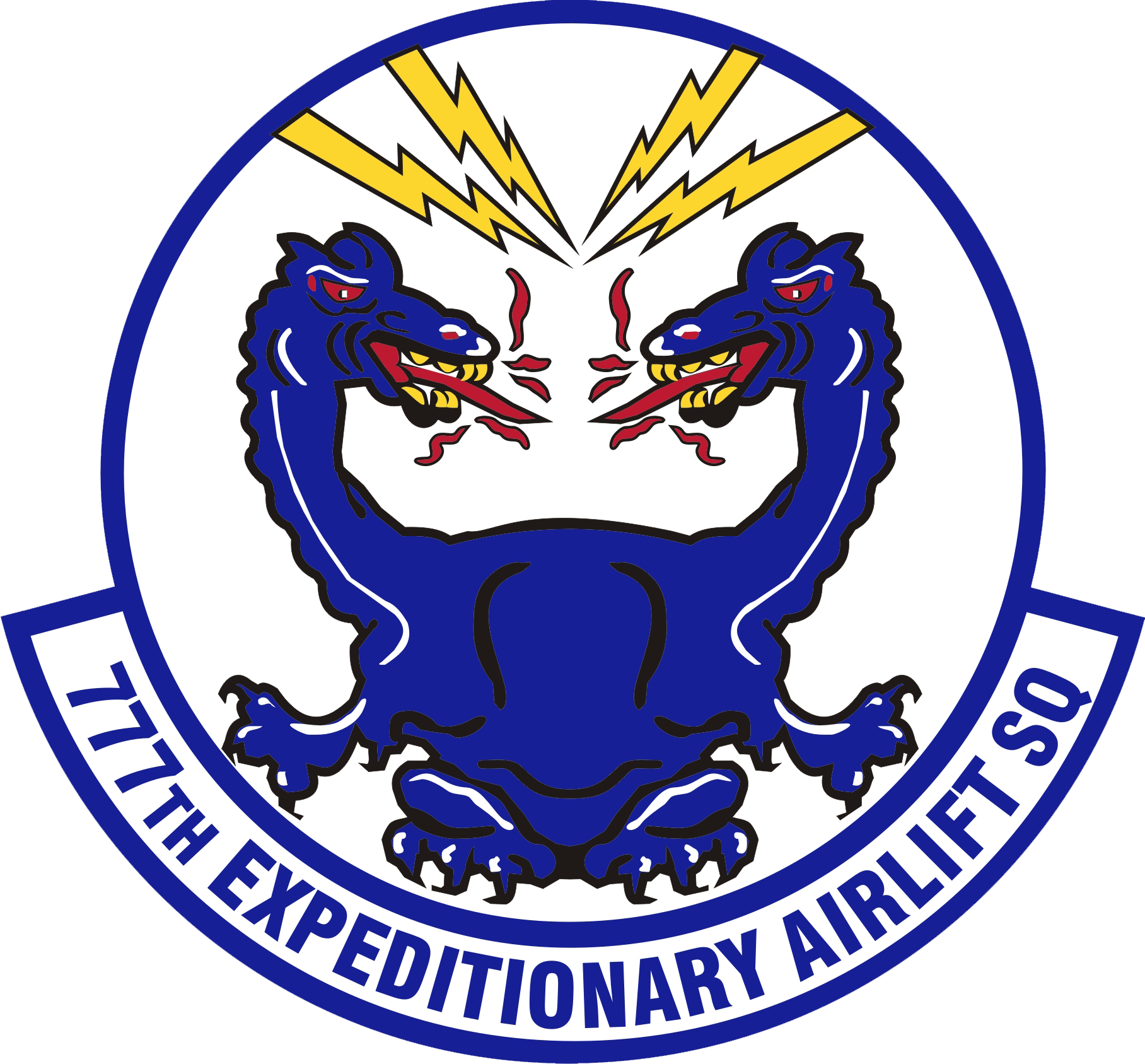
- 777th Expeditionary Airlft Squadron emblem (Note: Approved 16 April 1958. Description: On a white disc, an Air Force blue dragon with two heads respectant, breathing fire proper colors, mouths, tongues, eyes and nostrils red, highlights white; issuing from the top of disc, four Air Force golden yellow lightning flashes converging to a point above and between the two dragon heads; all within an Air Force blue border; outlines and details black throughout.)
- Tail Code1968–1971: PB

The 777th Expeditionary Airlift Squadron is a provisional United States Air Force squadron, which served for various periods between August 1943 and May 2011.

The squadron was created on 1 August 1943 during World War II as the 777th Bombardment Squadron. It flew Consolidated B-24 Liberators in the Mediterranean Theater of Operations, earning two Distinguished Unit Citations for its actions. When the war ended, the squadron helped transport troops back to the United States, and was inactivated in July 1945.

Reactivated in 1953 as the 777th Troop Carrier Squadron, it replaced the 72d Troop Carrier Squadron, a reserve unit recalled to active duty for the Korean War at Lawson Air Force Base, Georgia. It moved to Pope Air Force Base, North Carolina, operating first Fairchild C-119 Flying Boxcars, then Fairchild C-123 Providers. It was deployed to Vietnam in 1962 as part of Project Mule Train, before transferring its deployed crews and planes to the 311th Troop Carrier Squadron in 1963.

On returning to Pope, it converted to Lockheed C-130 Hercules aircraft, participating in Operation Dragon Rouge in 1964, and Operation Power Pack in 1965. It was inactivated on 31 August 1971, when the 39th Tactical Airlift Squadron replaced it at Pope, before being reactivated in 2003 for service in Operation Enduring Freedom. It flew airlift missions in Iraq until inactivating once again in May 2011.

== History ==
=== World War II ===
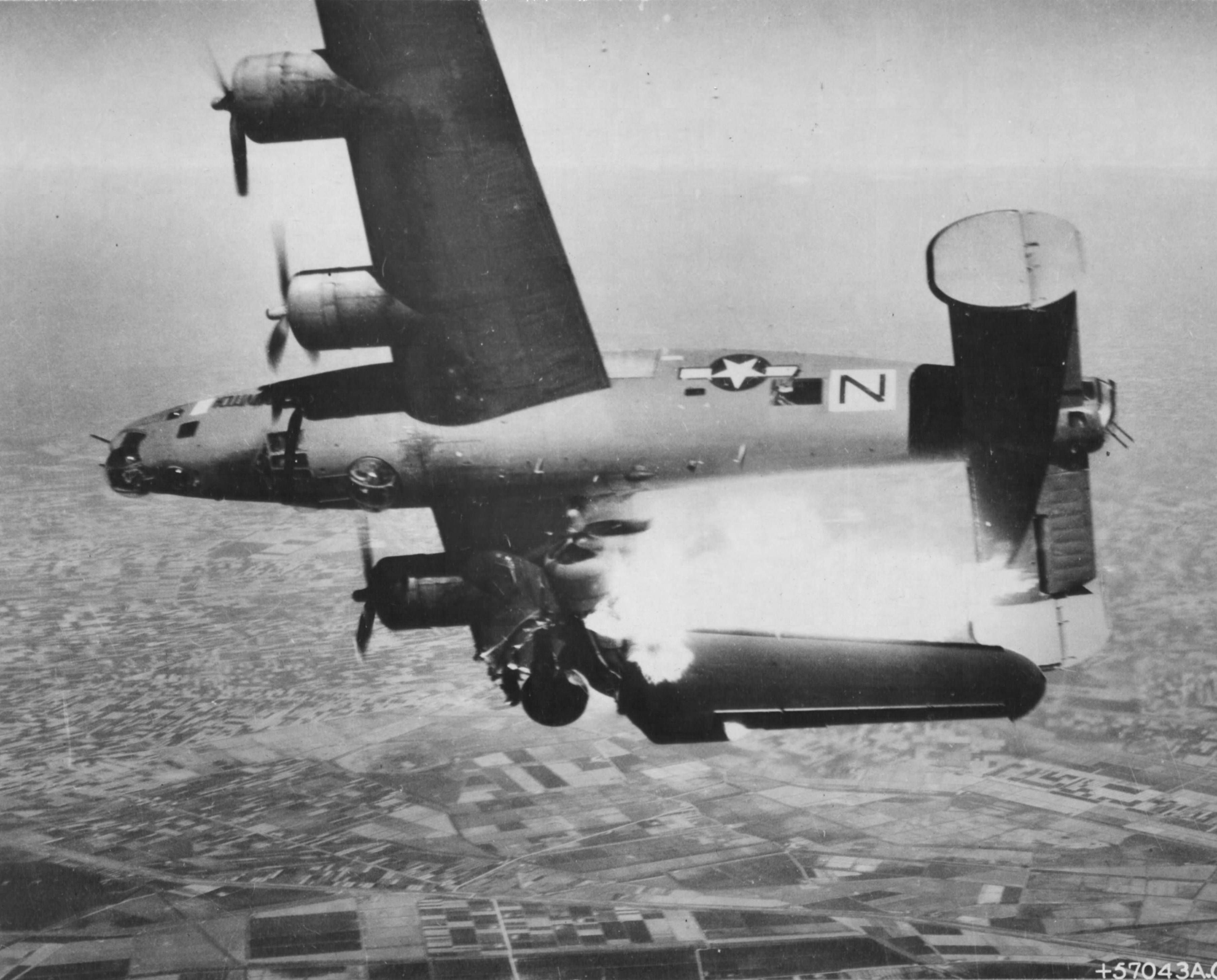
464th B-24 hit by Flak

The 777th Bombardment Squadron was activated on 1 August 1943 at Wendover Field, Utah as a Consolidated B-24 Liberator heavy bombardment unit. The squadron was one of the 464th Group's four original squadrons, After gathering its initial cadre, the squadron moved to Gowen Field, Idaho for training with II Bomber Command. After training in Idaho and Utah, the squadron began its move to the Mediterranean Theater of Operations in February 1944.

The 777th deployed to southern Italy in February 1944, where it became part of Fifteenth Air Force's 55th Bombardment Wing. The air echelon trained for a few weeks in Tunisia before joining the remainder of the group in Italy and entering combat in April.

The group engaged in long range strategic bombing missions to enemy military, industrial and transportation targets in Italy, France, Germany, Austria, Hungary, Romania, and Yugoslavia, bombing railroad marshaling yards, oil refineries, airdrome installations, heavy industry, and other strategic objectives.

Notable missions of the Oil Campaign of World War II included Operation Tidal Wave, bombing of the Concordia Vega Refinery near Ploiești on 18 May 1944, the marshaling yards and oil refinery at Vienna on 8 July 1944, for which the squadron was awarded the Distinguished Unit Citation (DUC), and the Pardubice oil refinery and nearby railroad tracks on 24 August 1944, for which it also was awarded a DUC.

The squadron sometimes engaged in support and interdiction operations. It supported Allied forces during Operation Dragoon, the invasion of Southern France in August 1944. It hit railroad centers to assist the advance of the Red Army in southeastern Europe in March 1945. It bombed enemy supply lines to assist Operation Grapeshot, the advance of the US Fifth and British Eighth Army in northern Italy in April 1945.

After V-E Day, the squadron was assigned to the Green Project, the movement of troops from Europe to the United States via the South Atlantic Transport Route. B-24s were modified with sealed bomb bays, removal of all defensive armament and internal fuselage equipped with seating to carry approximately 30 personnel. It was assigned to Air Transport Command (ATC) at Waller Field, Trinidad. The group moved personnel from Natal, Brazil and Atkinson Field, British Guiana to Morrison Field, Florida. It provided air transport until the end of July when the unit was inactivated, and most of its personnel assigned to the South Atlantic and Caribbean Wings of ATC.

=== Replacement of reserve wing ===
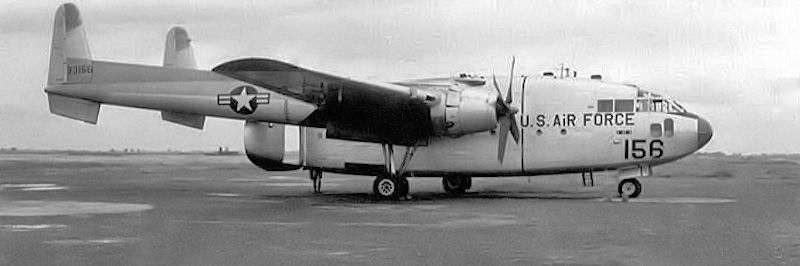
Fairchild C-119G Flying Boxcar

The squadron was reactivated as the 777th Troop Carrier Squadron and activated at Lawson Air Force Base, Georgia on 1 February 1953. The squadron replaced the 72d Troop Carrier Squadron, a reserve unit that had been called to active duty for the Korean War with its parent 434th Troop Carrier Wing. The 434th Wing was in the process of transitioning from the Curtiss C-46 Commando to the Fairchild C-119 Flying Boxcar when the squadron took over the personnel and aircraft of the 72d. In September 1954, the squadron moved to Pope Air Force Base, North Carolina where it was colocated with the Army's 82d Airborne Division at Fort Bragg.

The unit provided tactical airlift of troops and cargo, participated in joint airborne training with Army forces, and took part in tactical exercises in the United States and overseas. The squadron provided aeromedical airlift and flew humanitarian missions as required.

=== Assault operations and early Vietnam support ===
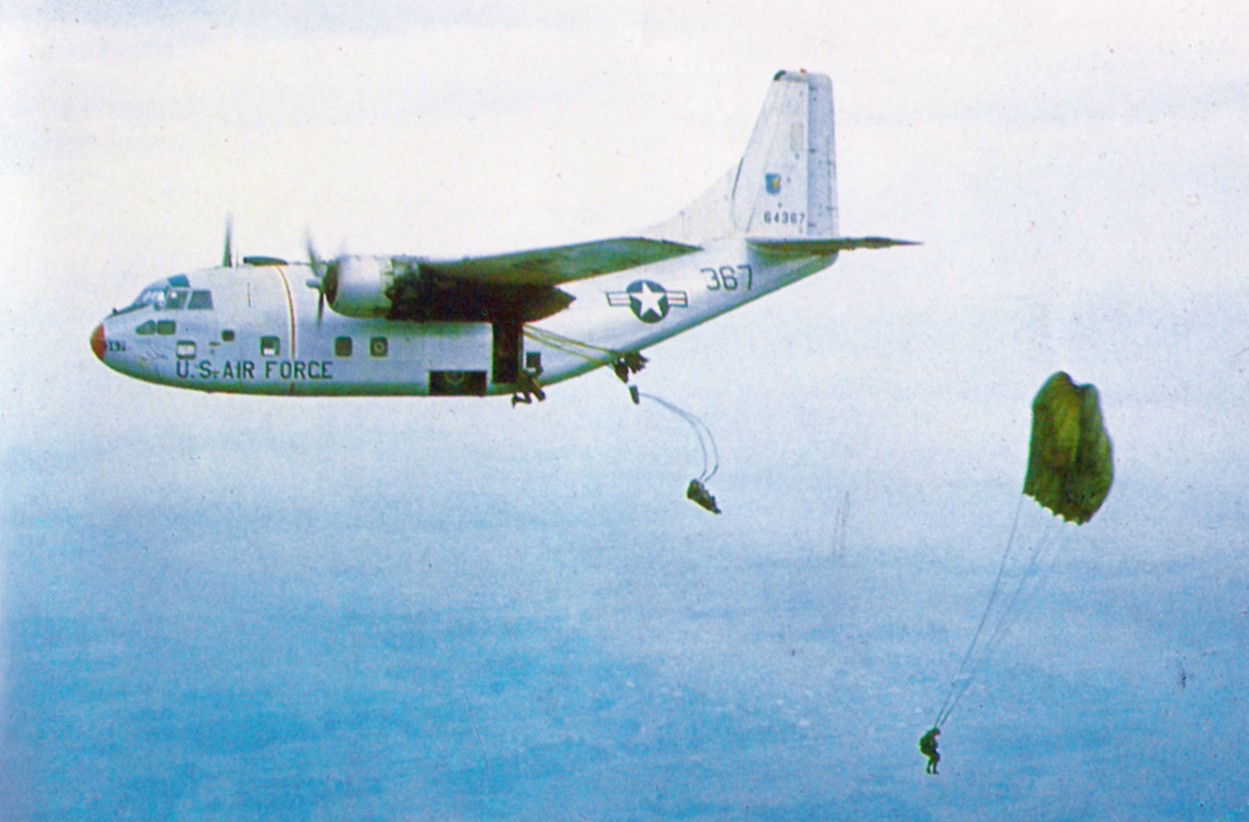
464th Wing C-123B Provider (Note: The aircraft is Fairchild C-123B serial 56-64367. The photograph is identified as being taken in Vietnam in 1966. However, the wing units' deployments to Vietnam were earlier. By 1966, C-123s in Vietnam were assigned to the 315th Air Commando Wing and were camouflaged.)

In November 1957, the 464th Troop Carrier Wing converted to the dual deputy organization. The wing's 464th Troop Carrier Group was inactivated, and the squadron was assigned directly to the wing. The squadron, meanwhile, began trading its C-119s for Fairchild C-123 Providers before the end of the year.

Project Mule Train provided airlift support in Vietnam early in the United States' involvement, and was supported by deployed C-123s. In June 1962, the Joint Chiefs of Staff directed the Air Force to double its commitment to this project. TAC deployed the squadron with sixteen aircraft and their crews. Four of the planes were stationed in Thailand, while the remainder were stationed at Da Nang Air Base, Vietnam, where they were attached to the 6492d Combat Cargo Group. In July 1963, the Air Force decided to make its airlift in Vietnam regular, and on 1 July, the 777th was reassigned to the 315th Troop Carrier Group, which had replaced the 6492d in December 1962. Its crews and planes located in Vietnam were transferred to the newly activated 311th Troop Carrier Squadron on 8 July, and it returned to the 464th Wing on the same day as a paper unit. and the squadron was ready for conversion to the Lockheed C-130 Hercules.

=== C-130 Hercules operations ===
In 1964, the Simba rebellion began in the Congo and rebels gained control of large areas of the eastern part of the country, including Stanleyville and the United States consulate there, taking several State Department employees and others captive. The United States set up a Joint Task Force, which included four C-130s of the 464th Wing to rescue State Department employees in Stanleyville. The Wing's commitment increased to 14 aircraft with the development of an expanded rescue plan called Operation Dragon Rouge. These aircraft and crews, some from the 777th Squadron, were on rotation duty with the 322d Air Division at Evreux Air Base, France and were conveniently located to airlift Belgian forces. The wing dropped Belgian paratroops into Stanleyville, and after the runways were cleared, landed additional troops at Simi-Simi Airport. Once the city was secured, The C-130s began shuttling refugees out of the city, under fire as they departed, and with 100 passengers on each plane. Five aircraft were damaged as 2,000 refugees were evacuated. (Note: Haulman gives the number of evacuees at 1200. Haulman, p. 58.) An additional 500–1000 were evacuated from Paulis in a follow-on operation, (Note: Haulman's total rescued from Paulis is 520, although it is not clear that the wing participated in more than 270 of these rescues. Haulman, p.58.) although not all hostages could be rescued and a number were executed by the Simba rebels. The 464th Wing received the Mackay Trophy for this operation.

In April 1965, the United States decided to deploy troops to the Dominican Republic following the start of a civil war there. on 30 April, aircraft of the 464th Wing airlanded the 3rd Brigade of the 82d Airborne Division at San Isidro Air Base. The 46 aircraft dispatched to San Isidro so overcrowded the field that many were unable to unload and some had to be diverted to Ramey Air Force Base, Puerto Rico. (Note: The original destination of the force had been Ramey, with an airdrop north of San Isidro. These plans were changed after the force was already in the air. Greenberg, p. 38.) The following day, "an air bridge was established between Pope and San Isidro . . . with a transport . . . landing on an average . . . once every five minutes." (Note: This included other troop carrier units. President Lyndon Johnson had directed that all USAF forces not supporting the war in Southeast Asia be made available to support the operation. Greenberg, p. 44.) In late May, the operation in the Dominican Republic came under the aegis of the Organization of American States and American planes flew in the first Latin American troops.

The squadron continued to perform tactical airlift missions until August 1971 when it was inactivated and its mission, personnel and equipment were absorbed by the 39th Tactical Airlift Squadron, which had been inactivated at Lockbourne Air Force Base, Ohio the previous month and which was activated at Pope the same day.

=== Expeditionary unit ===
The squadron was redesignated 777th Air Expeditionary Squadron and converted to provisional status in December 2001. It was activated as a C-130 Hercules airlift squadron as part of Operation Enduring Freedom a few months later. The squadron moved to Joint Base Balad in February 2006. From Balad, the squadron flew more than 43,000 sorties. In February 2007, the squadron was the first to use the more accurate Joint Precision Airdrop System in Iraq. It was part of the program to reduce ground convoy operations, switching the movement of materiel and personnel to airlift operations to avoid the vulnerability of ground convoys to improvised explosive devices and ambush. The squadron was inactivated in May 2011 and its remaining mission was absorbed by the 386th Air Expeditionary Wing.

== Lineage ==
- Constituted as the 777th Bombardment Squadron (Heavy) on 19 May 1943

Activated on 1 August 1943

- Redesignated 777th Bombardment Squadron, Heavy on 29 September 1944

Inactivated on 31 July 1945
Redesignated 777th Bombardment Squadron, Very Heavy on 14 November 1945
Redesignated 777th Troop Carrier Squadron, Medium on 15 December 1952

- Activated on 1 February 1953

Redesignated 777th Troop Carrier Squadron, Assault on 1 December 1958
Redesignated 777th Troop Carrier Squadron, Medium on 8 January 1964
Redesignated 777th Troop Carrier Squadron on 1 March 1966
Redesignated 777th Troop Tactical Airlift Squadron on 1 May 1967
Inactivated on 31 August 1971

- Converted to provisional status and redesignated 777th Expeditionary Airlift Squadron on 4 December 2001

Activated c. 1 March 2002
Inactivated 6 May 2011

=== Assignments ===
- 464th Bombardment Group, 1 August 1943 – 31 July 1945
- 464th Troop Carrier Group, 1 February 1953
- 464th Troop Carrier Wing (later 464th Tactical Airlift) Wing, 11 November 1957 – 31 August 1971 (attached to 315th Air Division, 31 March 1968 – 1 August 1968)
- Air Combat Command, to activate or inactivate as needed, 6 December 2001

Probably 407th Air Expeditionary Group, c. 1 March 2002
332d Expeditionary Operations Group, – 6 May 2011

=== Stations ===
- Wendover Field, Utah, 1 August 1943
- Gowen Field, Idaho, 22 August 1943
- Pocatello Army Air Field, Idaho, 2 October 1943 – 9 February 1944
- Pantanella Airfield, Italy, 10 April 1944
- Gioia del Colle Airfield, Italy, 20 April 1944
- Pantanella Airfield, Italy, c. 1 June 1944 – c. 6 June 1945
- Waller Field, Trinidad, 15 June 1945 – 31 July 1945
- Lawson Air Force Base, Georgia, 1 February 1953
- Pope Air Force Base North Carolina, 16 September 1954
- Da Nang Air Base, Vietnam, 1 July 1963
- Pope Air Force Base, North Carolina, 8 July 1963 – 31 August 1971
- Ali Air Base, Iraq, c. 1 March 2002
- Joint Base Balad, Iraq, February 2006 – 6 May 2011

=== Aircraft ===
- Consolidated B-24 Liberator, 1943–1945
- Curtiss C-46 Commando, 1953–1954
- Fairchild C-119 Flying Boxcar, 1953–1958
- Fairchild C-123 Provider, 1958–1968
- Lockheed C-130 Hercules, 1968–1971, 2002–2011

=== Awards and campaigns ===
Award streamer	Award	Dates	Notes
	Distinguished Unit Citation	8 July 1944	Vienna, Austria, 777th Bombardment Squadron
	Distinguished Unit Citation	24 August 1944	Pardubice, Czechoslovakia, 777th Bombardment Squadron
	Air Force Meritorious Unit Award	1 January 2005–30 April 2005	777th Expeditionary Airlift Squadron
	Air Force Outstanding Unit Award with Combat "V" Device	1 March 2002–31 May 2003	777th Expeditionary Airlift Squadron
	Air Force Outstanding Unit Award with Combat "V" Device	21 March 2003–31 March 2003	777th Expeditionary Airlift Squadron
	Air Force Outstanding Unit Award with Combat "V" Device	1 April 2003–30 June 2003	777th Expeditionary Airlift Squadron
	Air Force Outstanding Unit Award with Combat "V" Device	1 July 2004–31 May 2005	777th Expeditionary Airlift Squadron
	Air Force Outstanding Unit Award with Combat "V" Device	1 June 2005–31 May 2006	777th Expeditionary Airlift Squadron
	Air Force Outstanding Unit Award	28 November 1961-1 May 1963	777th Troop Carrier Squadron

Campaign Streamer	Campaign	Dates	Notes
	Rome-Arno	10 April 1944 – 9 September 1944	777th Bombardment Squadron
	Southern France	15 August 1944 – 14 September 1944	777th Bombardment Squadron
	Northern France	25 July 1944 – 14 September 1944	777th Bombardment Squadron
	North Apennines	10 September 1944 – 4 April 1945	777th Bombardment Squadron
	Po Valley	3 April 1945 – 8 May 1945	777th Bombardment Squadron
	Iraqi Governance	29 June 2004 – 15 December 2005	777th Expeditionary Airlift Squadron
	National Resolution	16 December 2005 – 9 January 2007	777th Expeditionary Airlift Squadron
	Iraqi Surge	10 January 2007 – 31 December 2008	777th Expeditionary Airlift Squadron
	Iraqi Sovereignty	1 January 2009 – 31 August 2010	777th Expeditionary Airlift Squadron
	New Dawn	1 September 2010 – 6 May 2011	777th Expeditionary Airlift Squadron

== See also ==
- B-24 Liberator units of the United States Army Air Forces
