= 464th Tactical Airlift Wing =

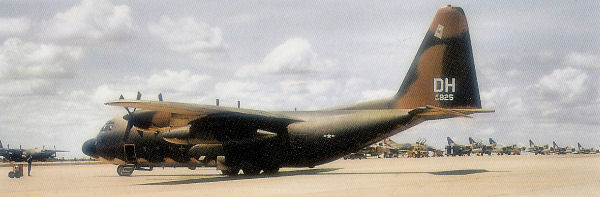
- C-130 Hercules in 1960s camouflage
- Active: 1953–1971
- Country: United States
- Branch: United States
- Role: Tactical airlift
- Motto: Certissimus in Incertis (Latin for 'Most Certain in Uncertainties')
- Decorations: Air Force Outstanding Unit Award (Note: The wing is also entitled to display the Distinguished Unit Citation earned by the 464th Bombardment Group during World War II, by temporary bestowal of the group's history and awards.)

Insignia
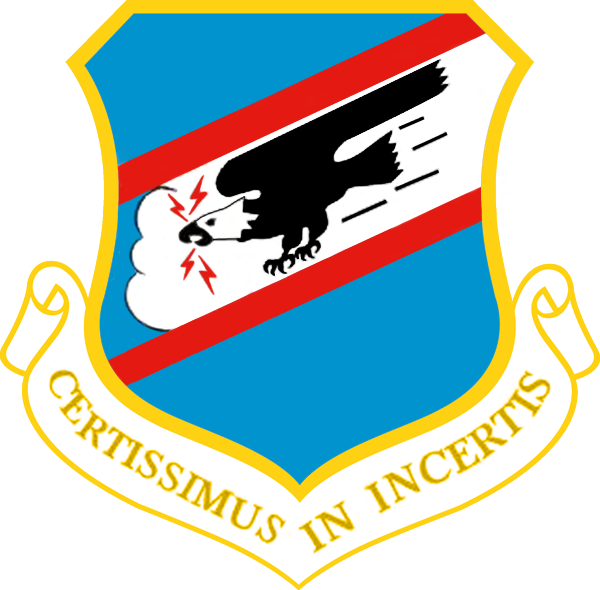
- 464th Troop Carrier Wing emblem (Note: Approved 15 April 1954.)

The 464th Tactical Airlift Wing was a theater airlift unit of the United States Air Force during the Cold War. It served in the United States under Tactical Air Command between 1953 and 1971. Its predecessor was the United States Army Air Forces 464th Bombardment Group of World War II.

== History ==
=== Replacement of reserve wing ===
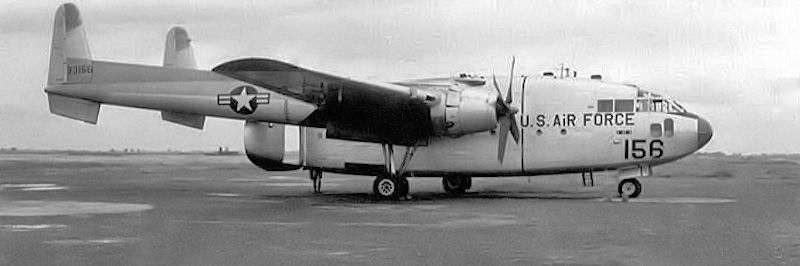
Fairchild C-119G Flying Boxcar

The wing was constituted as the 464th Troop Carrier Wing and activated at Lawson Air Force Base, Georgia on 1 February 1953, where it was assigned to Eighteenth Air Force. The wing replaced the 434th Troop Carrier Wing, a reserve unit that had been called to active duty for the Korean War. The 434th Wing was in the process of transitioning from the Curtiss C-46 Commando to the Fairchild C-119 Flying Boxcar when the wing took over the personnel and aircraft of the 434th. In September 1954, the wing moved to Pope Air Force Base, North Carolina where it was colocated with the Army's 82d Airborne Division at Fort Bragg. During its time at Pope, a major period of facility expansion occurred. The main runway, the taxiways, and the ramp were all expanded to support the 464th’s Flying Boxcar operations.

The unit provided tactical airlift of troops and cargo, participated in joint airborne training with Army forces, and took part in tactical exercises in the United States and overseas. The wing provided aeromedical airlift and flew humanitarian missions as required. From 1954 until it was inactivated, the 464th usually had two or more tactical squadrons deployed overseas at any one time, supporting airlift operations in Central America, Europe, the Middle East, the Far East, and Southeast Asia.

In February 1955, the 310th Troop Carrier Squadron, flying Sikorsky H-19 helicopters was activated at Pope and attached to the wing. While attached to the wing, the squadron supported Operation Red Wing, atomic weapon tests on Bikini and Eniwetok atolls in the Marshall Islands from February through June 1956. The squadron was inactivated in September 1956, after the Air Force conceded the helicopter airlift mission to the Army. A month after the inactivation of the 310th, the 347th Troop Carrier Squadron was activated at Pope, flying Fairchild C-123 Providers and attached to the wing.

=== Assault operations and early Vietnam support ===
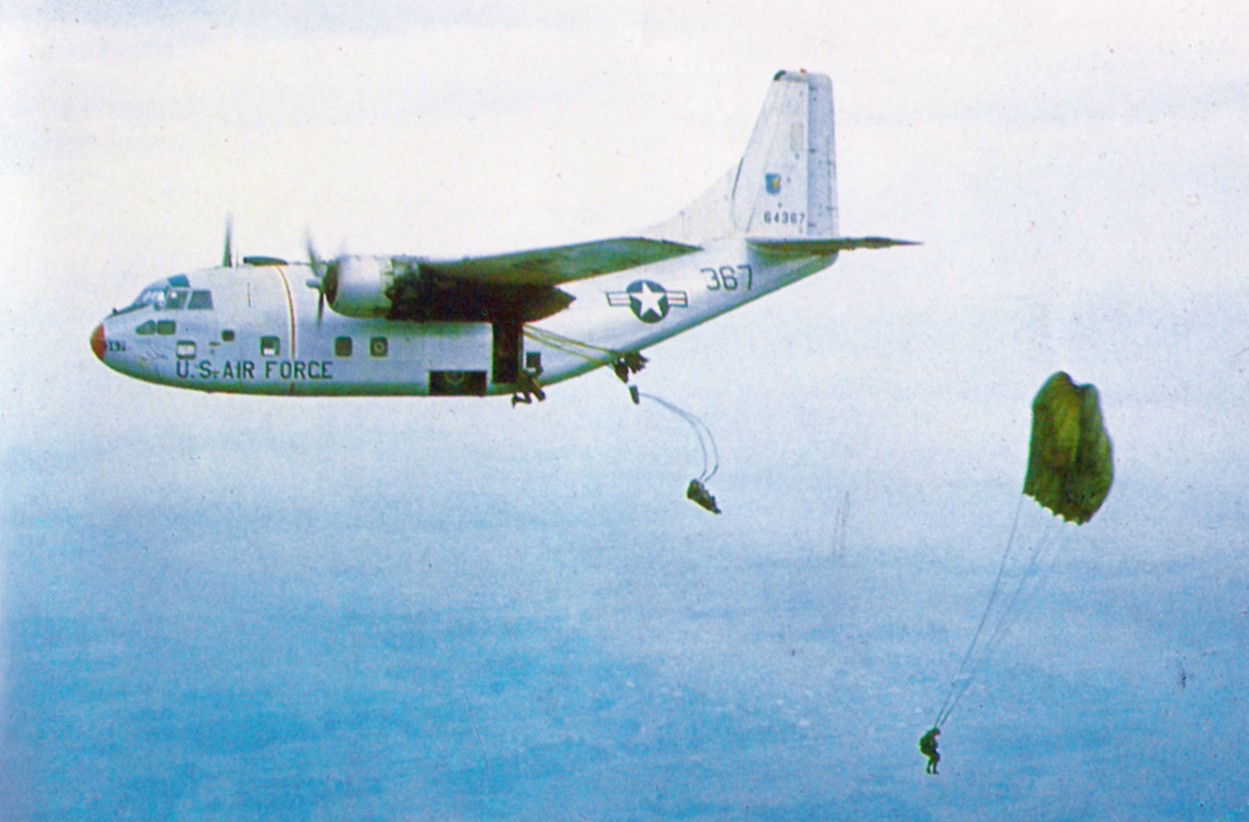
464th Wing C-123B Provider (Note: The aircraft is Fairchild C-123B serial 56-64367. The photograph is identified as being taken in Vietnam in 1966. However, the wing units' deployments to Vietnam were earlier. By 1966, C-123s in Vietnam were assigned to the 315th Air Commando Wing and were camouflaged.)

In 1957, Tactical Air Command (TAC) realigned its numbered air forces from a functional to a geographic basis and the wing was reassigned to Ninth Air Force. In November, the wing converted to the dual deputy organization, the wing's 464th Troop Carrier Group was inactivated, and the 776th, 777th, and 778th Troop Carrier Squadrons were assigned directly to the wing. A second Provider squadron, the 346th Troop Carrier Squadron, moved to Pope from Sewart Air Force Base, Tennessee and was attached to the wing. The wing's three assigned squadrons, meanwhile, began trading their C-119s for Providers before the end of the year.

Project Mule Train provided airlift support in Vietnam early in the United states' involvement, and was supported by deployed C-123s. In June 1962, the Joint Chiefs of Staff directed the Air Force to double its commitment to this project. TAC deployed the wing's 777th Troop Carrier Squadron with sixteen aircraft and their crews. Four of the planes were stationed in Thailand, while the remainder were stationed at Da Nang Air Base, Vietnam, where they were attached to the 6492d Combat Cargo Group. In July 1963, the Air Force decided to make its airlift in Vietnam regular, and on 1 July, the 777th (on its second deployment and located at Tan Son Nhut Airport and the 776th Squadrons were reassigned to the 315th Troop Carrier Group, which had replaced the 6492d in December 1962. Their crews and planes located in Vietnam were transferred to the newly-activated 310th and 311th Troop Carrier Squadrons on 1 July, and they were returned to the 464th Wing on 8 July as paper units. The two attached Provider squadrons moved to Dyess Air Force Base, Texas to form the 516th Troop Carrier Wing and the wing's three squadrons were ready for conversion to the Lockheed C-130 Hercules.

=== C-130 Hercules operations ===
In 1963, the first C-130 Hercules arrived, appropriately named The North Carolina. The wing added a fourth squadron, the 779th to its roster, but the 777th Squadron remained non-operational until September, when it could begin transitioning into the new airlifter. The wing had completed its conversion to the Hercules by the spring of 1964. On 1 April, the 775th Troop Carrier Squadron was activated and the wing's remaining Providers and associated resources were assigned to it. On 15 April, the 775th moved to Eglin Air Force Auxiliary Field No. 9 (Hurlburt Field), where it was assigned to the 1st Air Commando Wing. In July, the squadron was inactivated at Hurlburt and replaced by the 317th Air Commando Squadron. (Note: At p. 259, Ravenstein indicates the squadron was detached from 15 April until it was inactivated, but at p. 3 he states it was reassigned to the 1st Wing.)

In 1964, the Simba rebellion began in the Congo and rebels gained control of large areas of the eastern part of the country, including Stanleyville and the United States consulate there, taking several State Department employees and others captive. The United States set up a Joint Task Force, which included four C-130s of the 464th Wing to rescue State Department employees in Stanleyville. The Wing's commitment increased to 14 aircraft with the development of an expanded rescue plan called Operation Dragon Rouge. These aircraft, from the 776th and 777th Squadrons, were on rotation duty with the 322d Air Division at Evreux Air Base, France and were conveniently located to airlift Belgian forces. The wing dropped Belgian paratroops into Stanleyville, and after the runways were cleared, landed additional troops at Simi-Simi Airport. Once the city was secured, The C-130s began shuttling refugees out of the city, under fire as they departed, and with 100 passengers on each plane. Five aircraft were damaged as 2,000 refugees were evacuated. (Note: Haulman gives the number of evacuees at 1200. Haulman, p. 58.) An additional 500–1000 were evacuated from Paulis in a follow-on operation, (Note: Haulman's total rescued from Paulis is 520, although it is not clear that the wing participated in more than 270 of these rescues. Haulman, p.58.) although not all hostages could be rescued and a number were executed by the Simba rebels. The 464th received the Mackay Trophy for this operation.

In April 1965, the United States decided to deploy troops to the Dominican Republic following the start of a civil war there. on 30 April, the wing airlanded the 3rd Brigade of the 82d Airborne Division at San Isidro Air Base. The 46 aircraft dispatched to San Isidro so overcrowded the field that many were unable to unload and some had to be diverted to Ramey Air Force Base, Puerto Rico. (Note: The original destination of the force had been Ramey, with an airdrop north of San Isidro. These plans were changed after the force was already in the air. Greenberg, p. 38.) The following day, "an air bridge was established between Pope and San Isidro . . . with a transport . . . landing on an average . . . once every five minutes." (Note: This included other troop carrier units. President Lyndon Johnson had directed that all USAF forces not supporting the war in Southeast Asia be made available to support the operation. Greenberg, p. 44.) In late May, the operation in the Dominican Republic came under the aegis of the Organization of American States and American planes flew in the first Latin American troops. American forces began to withdraw, and by December only a few detachments remained. The wing's support continued until the termination of the Inter-American Peace Force in September 1966.

During the wing's support for this operation, in December 1965, the 776th Troop Carrier Squadron moved to Ching Chuan Kang Air Base to reinforce airlift forces in Southeast Asia, and was reassigned. Along with TAC's other troop carrier organizations, the 464th was redesignated 464th Tactical Airlift Wing on 1 May 1967. The wing was inactivated on 31 August 1971, when it was replaced by the 317th Tactical Airlift Wing, which moved to Pope on paper from Lockbourne Air Force Base, Ohio, which was being transferred from TAC to Strategic Air Command.

== Lineage ==
- Established as the 464th Troop Carrier Wing, Medium on 16 December 1952

Activated on 1 February 1953
Redesignated as 464th Troop Carrier Wing, Assault on 16 December 1958
Redesignated as 464th Troop Carrier Wing, Medium on 8 January 1964
Redesignated as 464th Troop Carrier Wing on 1 March 1966
Redesignated as 464th Tactical Airlift Wing on 1 May 1967
Inactivated on 31 August 1971

=== Assignments ===
- Eighteenth Air Force, 1 February 1953
- Ninth Air Force, 1 September 1957
- 838th Air Division, 1 July 1963
- 839th Air Division, 9 November 1964 – 31 August 1971

=== Components ===
Group

- 464th Troop Carrier Group: 1 February 1953 – 11 November 1957

Squadrons

- 310th Troop Carrier Squadron: (attached 8 February 1955 – 7 September 1956)
- 346th Troop Carrier Squadron: (attached 1 July 1958 – 1 April 1963)
- 347th Troop Carrier Squadron: (attached 8 October 1956 – 1 April 1963) (Note: Ravenstein says the attachment began on 8 October 1955, but this appears to be a typographic error. The 347th was inactivated along with its former parent 516th Troop Carrier Group in July 1956. It was reactivated at Pope on 8 October 1956.)
- 775th Troop Carrier Squadron: 1 April–15 April 1964
- 776th Troop Carrier Squadron: 11 November 1957 – 1 July 1963; 8 July 1963 – 26 December 1965
- 777th Troop Carrier Squadron (later 777th Tactical Airlift Squadron): 11 November 1957 – 1 July 1963 (attached to 6492d Combat Cargo Group 6 June 1962–1962, 315th Troop Carrier Group 5 April–1 July 1963), 8 July 1963 – 31 August 1971 (not operational until 30 September 1963) ( attached to 315th Air Division 10 April – 1 August 1968, detached 10 May–10 August 1969, 5 January–19 March 1970, 30 September–8 November 1970 and 3 March–17 May 1971)
- 778th Troop Carrier Squadron (later 778th Tactical Airlift Squadron): 11 November 1957 – 31 August 1971 (attached to 315th Air Division 1–23 August 1968, detached 13 January–15 April 1969, 13 October–31 December 1969 and 5 July–16 September 1970)
- 779th Troop Carrier Squadron (later 779th Tactical Airlift Squadron): 1 July 1963 – 31 August 1971 (attached to 315th Air Division 4 February – c. 10 April 1968, detached 25 September–22 November 1968, 3 August–22 October 1969, 5 April–19 June 1970 and 15 December 1970 – 17 February 1971)
- 4419th Flying Training Squadron (attached 1 May–1 August 1953, but not operational)

=== Stations ===
- Lawson Air Force Base, Georgia, 1 February 1953
- Pope Air Force Base, North Carolina, 21 September 1954 – 31 August 1971

=== Aircraft ===
- Curtiss C-46 Commando, 1953–1954
- Fairchild C-119 Flying Boxcar, 1953–1958
- Sikorsky H-19, 1955–1956
- Fairchild C-123 Provider, 1956–1964
- Lockheed C-130 Hercules, 1963–1971

=== Awards and campaigns ===
| Award streamer | Award | Dates | Notes |
|---|---|---|---|
| | Air Force Outstanding Unit Award | 28 November 1961-1 May 1963 | 464th Troop Carrier Wing |
| | Air Force Outstanding Unit Award | 20 November 1964-28 November 1964 | 464th Troop Carrier Wing |
| | Air Force Outstanding Unit Award | 1 July 1967-30 June 1968 | 464th Troop Carrier Wing |

| Expeditionary Streamer | Campaign | Dates | Notes |
|---|---|---|---|
| | Operation Dragon Rouge | 17 November 1964 – 2 December 1964 | 464th Troop Carrier Wing |
| | Operation Power Pack | 29 April 1965 – 21 September 1966 | 464th Troop Carrier Wing |

== See also ==
- List of inactive AFCON wings of the United States Air Force
- List of Lockheed C-130 Hercules operators
