= 464th Troop Carrier Group =

464th Troop Carrier Group

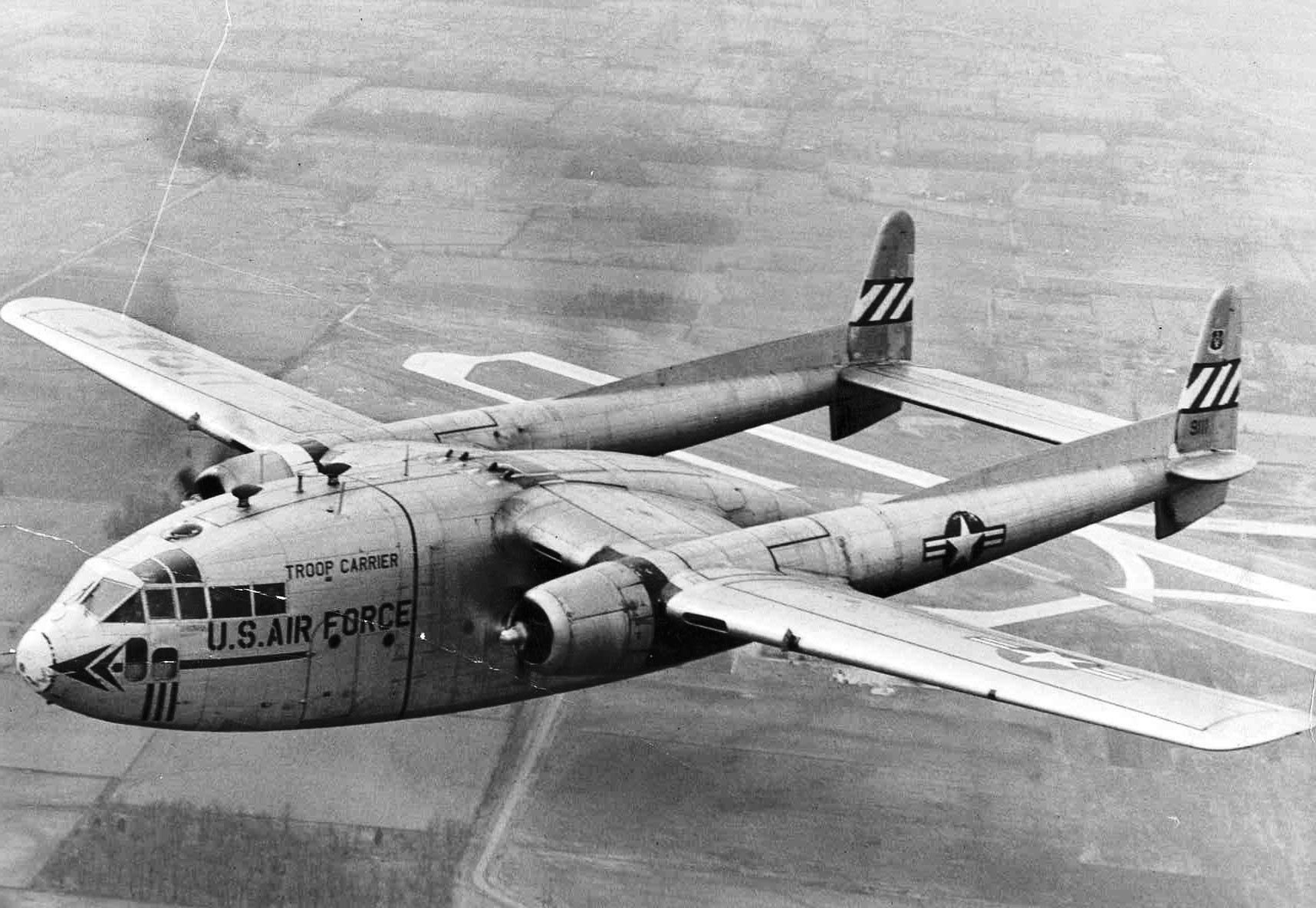
- C-119 Flying Boxcar
- Active: 1943–1945, 1953–1971
- Country: United States
- Branch: United States Air Force
- Role: Airlift
- Part of: Tactical Air Command
- Motto: Certissimus in Incertis Latin Most Certain in Uncertainties
- Engagements: Mediterranean Theater of Operations
- Decorations: Distinguished Unit Citation

Insignia
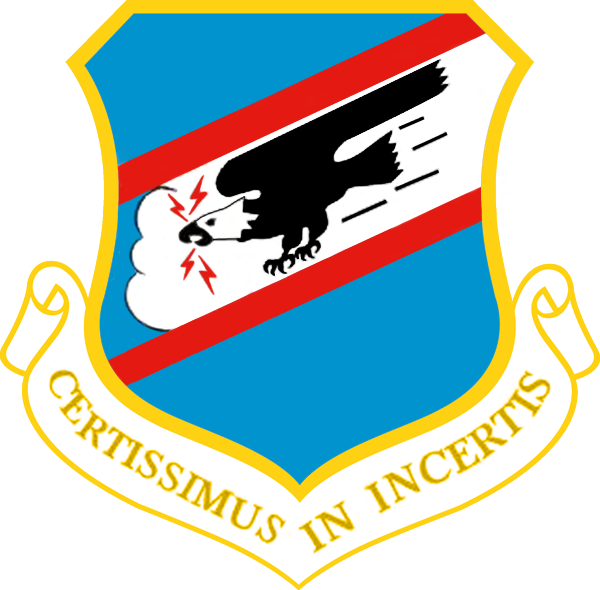
- 464th Troop Carrier Group emblem (Approved 15 April 1954) (Note: The group uses the wing emblem with the group designation on the scroll. Air Force Instruction 84-105, Organizational Lineage, Honors and Heraldry, 19 March 2013, para 3.3.3)

The 464th Troop Carrier Group was a theater airlift unit of the United States Air Force during the Cold War. It served in the United States under Tactical Air Command between 1953 and 1957. The group operated Fairchild C-119 Flying Boxcar and Fairchild C-123 Provider aircraft as the flying element of the 464th Troop Carrier Wing until being inactivated when the wing was reorganized.

The group was first organized in 1943 in the United States Army Air Forces as the 464th Bombardment Group. During World War II. the group served in the Mediterranean Theater of Operations with Consolidated B-24 Liberator heavy bombers. It was awarded the Distinguished Unit Citations for attacks on marshaling yards near Vienna, Austria in July 1944 and on an oil refinery near Pardubice, Czechoslovakia (now the Czech Republic) in August 1944. After V-E Day, the group moved to the Caribbean, where it was assigned to Air Transport Command and participated in the return of military personnel to the United States until it was inactivated in July 1945.

== History ==
=== World War II ===
Media related to 464th Bombardment Group (United States Army Air Forces) at Wikimedia Commons

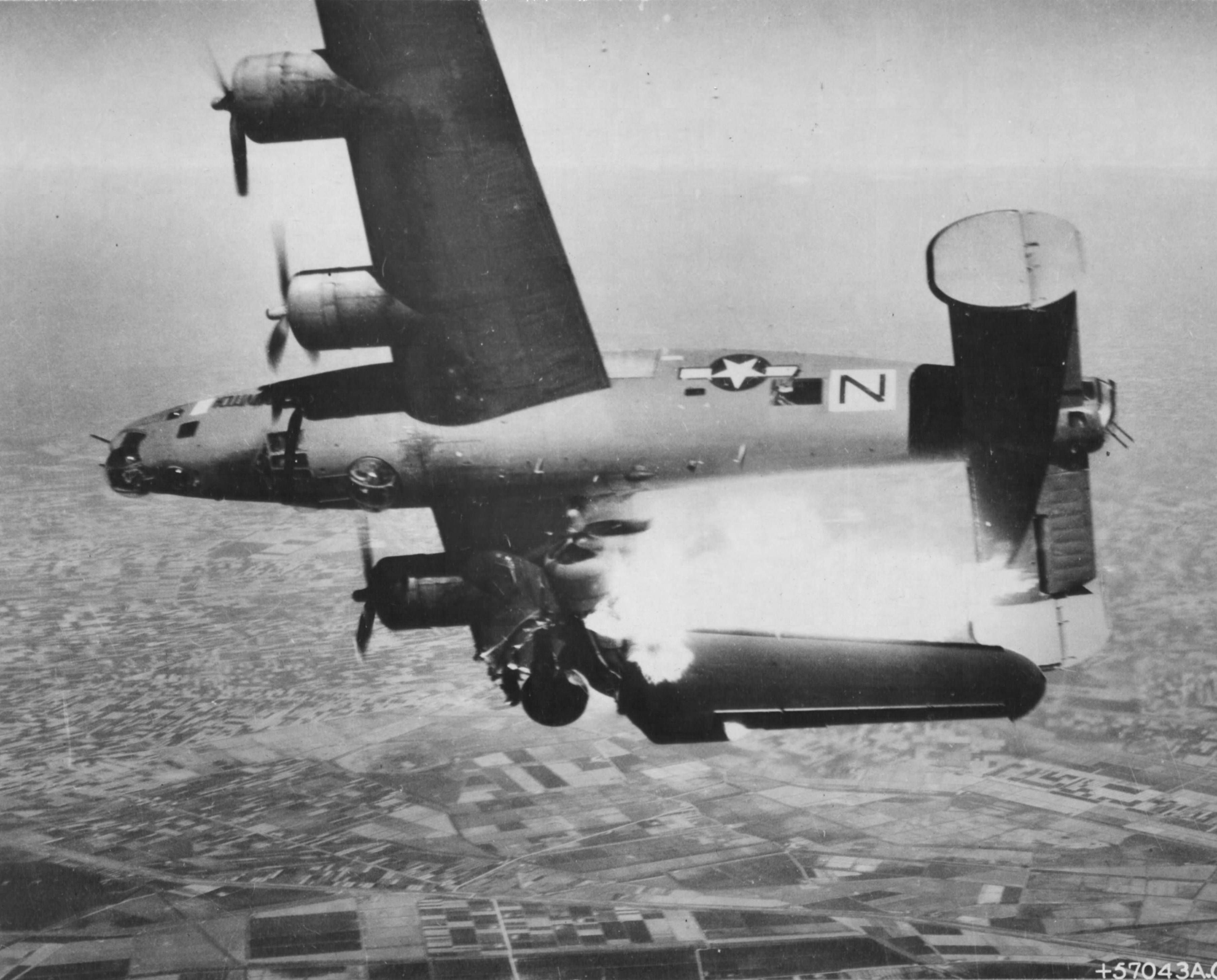
464th B-24 hit by Flak

The 464th Bombardment Group (Heavy) was activated on 1 August 1943 at Wendover Field, Utah as a Consolidated B-24 Liberator heavy bombardment unit. The group's squadrons were the 776th, 777th, 778th and 779th Bombardment Squadrons. After gathering its initial cadre, the group moved to Gowen Field, Idaho for training with II Bomber Command. After training in Idaho and Utah, the group began its move to the Mediterranean Theater of Operations in February 1944.

The 464th deployed to southern Italy in February 1944, where it was assigned to Fifteenth Air Force's 55th Bombardment Wing. The air echelon trained for a few weeks in Tunisia before joining the remainder of the group in Italy and entering combat in April.

The group engaged in long range strategic bombing missions to enemy military, industrial and transportation targets in Italy, France, Germany, Austria, Hungary, Romania, and Yugoslavia, bombing railroad marshaling yards, oil refineries, airdrome installations, heavy industry, and other strategic objectives.

Notable missions of the Oil Campaign of World War II included Operation Tidal Wave, bombing of the Concordia Vega Refinery near Ploiești on 18 May 1944, the marshaling yards and oil refinery at Vienna on 8 July 1944, for which the group was awarded the Distinguished Unit Citation, and the Pardubice oil refinery and nearby railroad tracks on 24 August 1944, for which it also was awarded a Distinguished Unit Citation.

The group sometimes engaged in support and interdiction operations. It supported Allied forces during Operation Dragoon, the invasion of Southern France in August 1944. It hit railroad centers to assist the advance of Red Army in southeastern Europe in March 1945. It bombed enemy supply lines to assist the advance of US Fifth and British Eighth Army in northern Italy in April 1945. In January 1945, the various units that had been supporting the 464th at Pantanella Airfield were reorganized into the 517th Air Service Group.

After V-E Day, the group was assigned to the Green Project, the movement of troops from Europe to the United States via the South Atlantic Transport Route. B-24s were modified with sealed bomb bays, removal of all defensive armament and internal fuselage equipped with seating to carry approximately 30 personnel. It was assigned to Air Transport Command at Waller Field, Trinidad. The group moved personnel from Natal, Brazil and Atkinson Field, British Guiana to Morrison Field, Florida. It provided air transport until the end of July when the unit was inactivated.

=== Cold War ===
The group was redesignated the 464th Troop Carrier Group and activated at Lawson Air Force Base, Georgia. on 1 February 1953. It was assigned to the 464th Troop Carrier Wing under the Wing Base organization system. The group replaced the 434th Troop Carrier Group, a reserve unit that had been called to active duty for the Korean War. It took over the personnel and Curtiss C-46 Commando and Fairchild C-119 Flying Boxcar aircraft of the 434th.

The unit provided tactical airlift of troops and cargo, participated in joint airborne training with Army forces, and took part in tactical exercises in the United States and overseas. The wing provided aeromedical airlift and flew humanitarian missions as required. The group was inactivated in 1957, when Tactical Air Command converted its flying wings to the dual deputy organization., (Note: Under this plan flying squadrons reported to the wing Deputy Commander for Operations)

The group was redesignated the 464th Tactical Airlift Group in inactive status on 31 July 1985.

== Lineage ==
- Constituted as the 464th Bombardment Group (Heavy) on 19 May 1943

Activated on 1 August 1943

- Redesignated 464th Bombardment Group, Heavy on 29 September 1944

Inactivated on 31 July 1945

- Redesignated 464th Troop Carrier Group, Medium on 16 December 1952

Activated on 1 February 1953
Inactivated on 11 November 1957

- Redesignated 464th Tactical Airlift Group on 31 July 1985

=== Assignments ===
- II Bomber Command, 1 August 1943
- 55th Bombardment Wing, 2 October 1943
- Caribbean Wing, Air Transport Command, 1 June – 31 July 1945
- 464th Troop Carrier Wing, 1 February 1953 – 11 November 1957

=== Components ===
- 776th Bombardment Squadron (later 776th Troop Carrier Squadron): 1 August 1943 – 31 July 1945, 1 February 1953 – 11 November 1957
- 777th Bombardment Squadron (later 777th Troop Carrier Squadron): 1 August 1943 – 31 July 1945, 1 February 1953 – 11 November 1957
- 778th Bombardment Squadron (later 778th Troop Carrier Squadron): 1 August 1943 – 31 July 1945, 1 February 1953 – 11 November 1957
- 779th Bombardment Squadron (later 779th Troop Carrier Squadron): 1 August 1943 – 31 July 1945, 8 June 1955 – 1 August 1957

=== Awards and campaigns ===
Award streamer	Award	Dates	Notes
	Distinguished Unit Citation	8 July 1944	Vienna, Austria, 464th Bombardment Group
	Distinguished Unit Citation	24 August 1944	Pardubice, Czechoslovakia, 464th Bombardment Group

Campaign Streamer	Campaign	Dates	Notes
	Rome-Arno	10 April 1944 – 9 September 1944	464th Bombardment Group
	Southern France	15 August 1944 – 14 September 1944	464th Bombardment Group
	Northern France	25 July 1944 – 14 September 1944	464th Bombardment Group
	North Apennines	10 September 1944 – 4 April 1945	464th Bombardment Group
	Po Valley	3 April 1945 – 8 May 1945	464th Bombardment Group

=== Stations ===
- Wendover Field, Utah, 1 August 1943
- Gowen Field, Idaho, 22 August 1943
- Pocatello Army Air Field, Idaho, 2 October 1943 – 9 February 1944
- Pantanella Airfield, Italy, March 1944
- Gioia del Colle Airfield, Italy, 21 April 1944
- Pantanella Airfield, Italy, c. 1 June 1944 – c. May 1945
- Waller Field, Trinidad, 1 June – 31 July 1945
- Lawson Air Force Base, Georgia, 1 February 1953
- Pope Air Force Base, North Carolina, 21 September 1954 – 11 November 1957

=== Aircraft ===
- Consolidated B-24 Liberator, 1943–1945
- Curtiss C-46 Commando 1953–1954
- Fairchild C-119 Flying Boxcar 1953–1957
- Fairchild C-123 Provider 1955–1957

== See also ==
- List of United States Air Force Groups
- B-24 Liberator units of the United States Army Air Forces
