= KLSF =

KLSF may refer to:

- KLSF (FM), a radio station (89.7 FM) licensed to Juneau, Alaska, United States
- Lawson Army Airfield (ICAO code KLSF)
