= 779th Expeditionary Airlift Squadron =

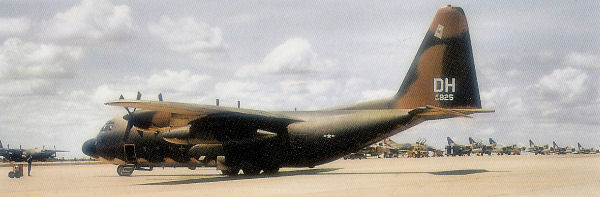
- C-130 Hercules in 1960s camouflage
- Active: 1943-1945; 1953-1957; 1963–1971; 2006; 2008; c. 2018-2021
- Country: United States
- Branch: United States Air Force
- Role: Airlift
- Engagements: Mediterranean Theater of Operations; Vietnam War
- Decorations: Distinguished Unit Citation; Air Force Outstanding Unit Award with Combat "V" Device; Republic of Vietnam Gallantry Cross with Palm

Insignia
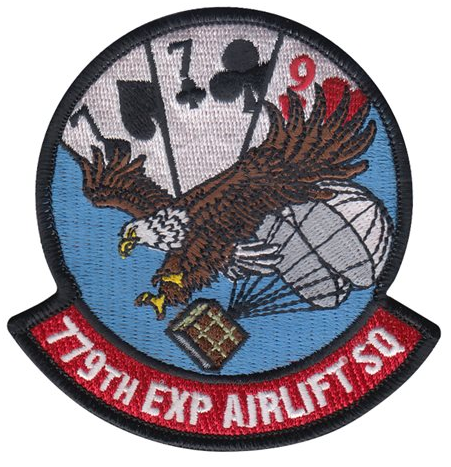
- Patch with 779th Expeditionary Airlift Squadron emblem

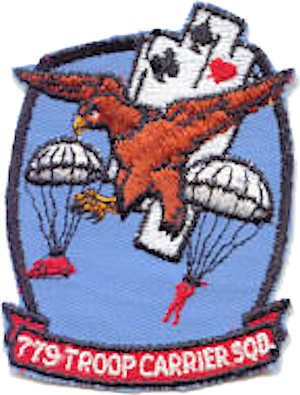
- Patch with 779th Troop Carrier Squadron emblem

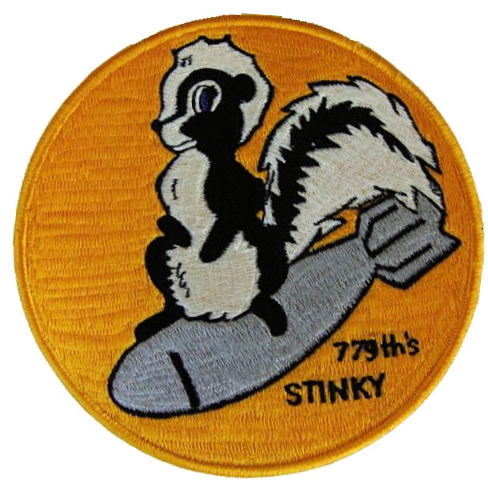
- 779th Bombardment Squadron emblem
- Tail Code after 1968: PR

The 779th Expeditionary Airlift Squadron was a provisional United States Air Force unit. Its most recent activation was in 2018 for Operation Inherent Resolve. The squadron was based at Ali Al Salem Air Base, Kuwait, and was filled by rotating Air National Guard and Air Force Reserve Command C-130 wings. The last two units that made up the 779th were the Delaware Air National Guard's 166th Airlift Wing and Air Force Reserve Command's 908th Airlift Wing. The squadron was redesignated as the 61st Expeditionary Airlift Squadron on 2 November 2021. It has also been activated for contingency operations at Ramstein Air Base.

The squadron was first active during World War II as the 779th Bombardment Squadron. After training in the United States, the squadron flew Consolidated B-24 Liberators in the Mediterranean Theater of Operations in the strategic bombing campaign against Germany. It earned two Distinguished Unit Citations for its actions during this campaign. Following the war, the squadron served in Air Transport Command to transport troops back to the United States from a base in South America before inactivating.

In June 1955, the squadron was reactivated as the 779th Troop Carrier Squadron at Pope Air Force Base, North Carolina, when the 464th Troop Carrier Group expanded from three to four operational squadrons. It was inactivated in 1957, but activated again in 1965 as the 464th Troop Carrier Wing was converting from the Fairchild C-123 Provider to the Lockheed C-130 Hercules. It was inactivated on 31 August 1971, when the 41st Tactical Airlift Squadron replaced it at Pope.

== History ==
=== World War II ===
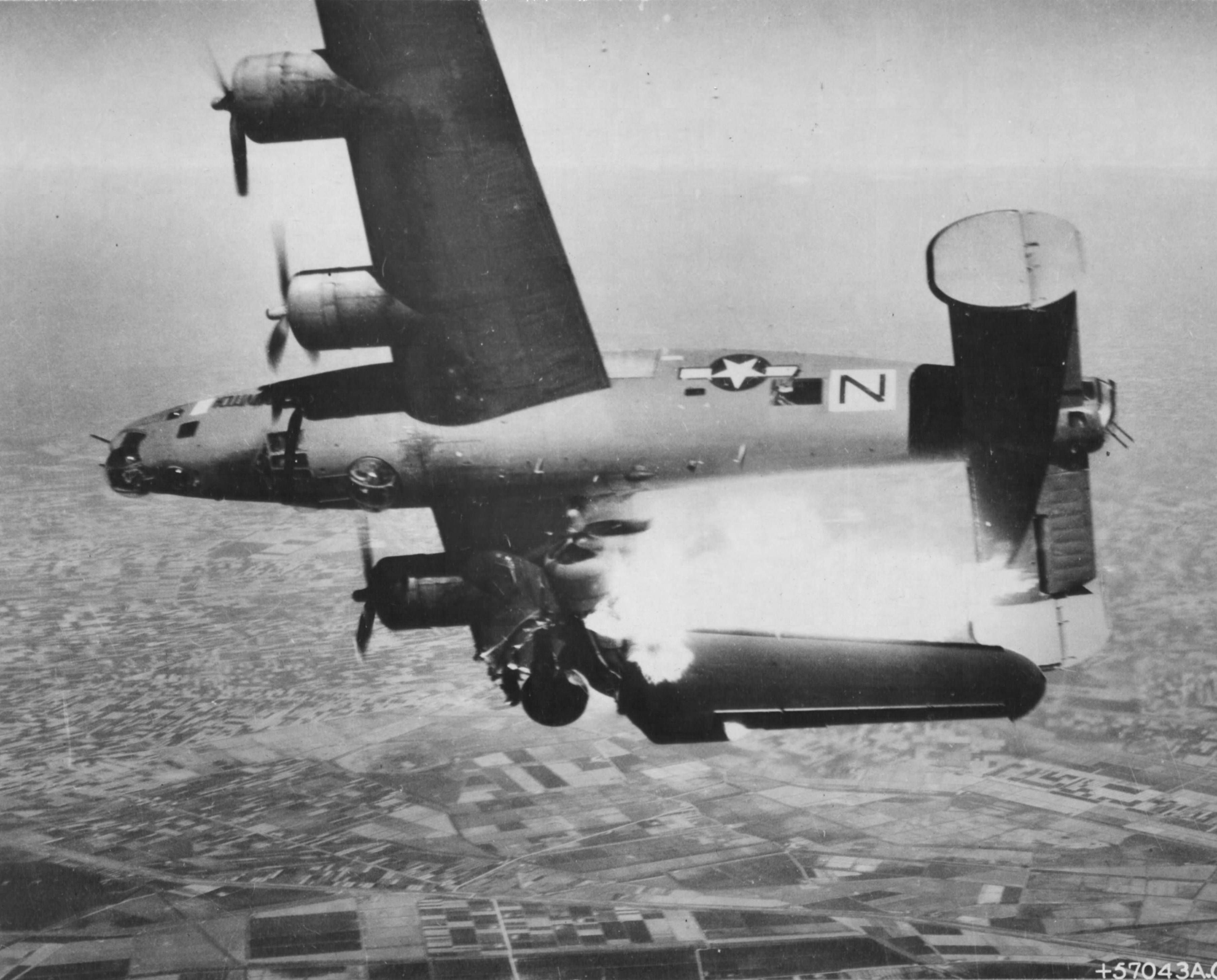
464th B-24 hit by Flak

The 779th Bombardment Squadron was activated on 1 August 1943 at Wendover Field, Utah as a Consolidated B-24 Liberator heavy bombardment unit. The squadron was one of the 464th Bombardment Group's four original squadrons, After gathering its initial cadre, the squadron moved to Gowen Field, Idaho for training with II Bomber Command. After training in Idaho and Utah, the squadron began its move to the Mediterranean Theater of Operations in February 1944.

The 779th deployed to southern Italy in February 1944, where it became part of Fifteenth Air Force's 55th Bombardment Wing. The air echelon trained for a few weeks in Tunisia before joining the remainder of the group in Italy and entering combat in April.

The group engaged in long range strategic bombing missions to enemy military, industrial and transportation targets in Italy, France, Germany, Austria, Hungary, Romania, and Yugoslavia, bombing railroad marshaling yards, oil refineries, airdrome installations, heavy industry, and other strategic objectives.

Notable missions of the Oil Campaign of World War II included Operation Tidal Wave, bombing of the Concordia Vega Refinery near Ploiești on 18 May 1944, the marshaling yards and oil refinery at Vienna on 8 July 1944, for which the squadron was awarded the Distinguished Unit Citation, and the Pardubice oil refinery and nearby railroad tracks on 24 August 1944, for which it also was awarded a Distinguished Unit Citation.

The squadron sometimes engaged in support and interdiction operations. It supported Allied forces during Operation Dragoon, the invasion of Southern France in August 1944. It hit railroad centers to assist the advance of the Red Army in southeastern Europe in March 1945. It bombed enemy supply lines to assist Operation Grapeshot, the advance of the US Fifth and British Eighth Army in northern Italy in April 1945.

After V-E Day, the squadron was assigned to the Green Project, the movement of troops from Europe to the United States via the South Atlantic Transport Route. B-24s were modified with sealed bomb bays, removal of all defensive armament and internal fuselage equipped with seating to carry approximately 30 personnel. It was assigned to Air Transport Command at Waller Field, Trinidad. The group moved personnel from Natal, Brazil and Atkinson Field, British Guiana to Morrison Field, Florida. It provided air transport until the end of July when the unit was inactivated.

=== C-119 Operations ===
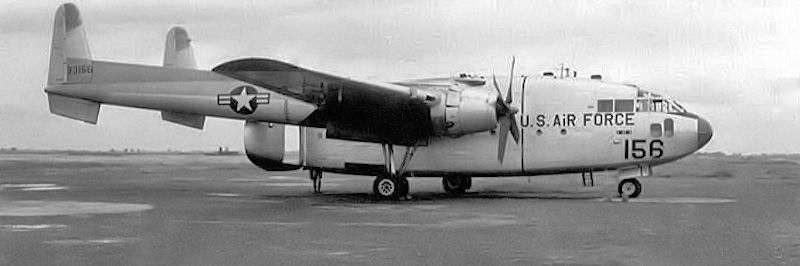
Fairchild C-119G Flying Boxcar

The squadron was reactivated as the 779th Troop Carrier Squadron at Pope Air Force Base, North Carolina on 8 June 1955, when the 464th Troop Carrier Group expanded from three to four operational squadrons. It was equipped with Fairchild C-119 Flying Boxcars The unit provided tactical airlift of troops and cargo, participated in joint airborne training with Army forces, and took part in tactical exercises in the United States and overseas. The squadron provided aeromedical airlift and flew humanitarian missions as required until inactivating in August 1957.

=== C-130 operations ===
The squadron was reactivated at Pope on 1 July 1963 as the 464th Troop Carrier Wing began to convert its other squadrons to the Lockheed C-130 Hercules aircraft and equipped with Fairchild C-123 Providers from the wing's other squadrons.

In 1965 the squadron received twelve modified C-130E-(I)s for special operations use and began training with the new airplanes in early 1966. The C-130E-(I)s were assigned to Detachment 1, 779th Troop Carrier Squadron. The squadron was placed on alert shortly after the USS Pueblo was captured by North Korea in January 1968. They were deployed to Tachikawa Air Base, Japan shortly thereafter. After a few days at Tachikawa they deployed to Cam Ranh Bay Air Base, Vietnam where they flew supply and troop transport during the Tet Offensive. While at Cam Ranh, enemy rockets were fired at the base from the overlooking hills striking fuel drums and a fuel bladder but no damage was don to the C-130s parked nearby. In early April 1968 they returned to Pope and were replaced in Cam Ranh Bay by the 778th Tactical Airlift Squadron also from Pope AFB, NC. The detachment was replaced by the 318th Special Operations Squadron in the late 1960s.

In August 1971, the squadron was inactivated and its mission, personnel and equipment were transferred to the 41st Tactical Airlift Squadron, which was activated at Pope the same day.

=== Expeditionary operations ===
The squadron was converted to provisional status as the 779th Expeditionary Airlift Squadron. It was activated at Ramstein Air Base, Germany, and inactivated on 15 April 2006. The unit was also active, operating out of Ali Al Salem Air Base, Kuwait, from 2018-2021. The unit's aircrews flew different models of the C-130.

== Lineage ==
- Constituted as the 779th Bombardment Squadron (Heavy) on 19 May 1943

Activated on 1 August 1943

- Redesignated 779th Bombardment Squadron, Heavy on 29 September 1944

Inactivated on 31 July 1945
Redesignated 779th Bombardment Squadron, Very Heavy on 14 November 1945 (Remained inactive)
Redesignated 779th Troop Carrier Squadron, Medium on 15 December 1952

- Activated on 8 June 1955

Inactivated on 1 August 1957

- Redesignated 779th Troop Carrier Squadron, Assault and activated on 12 June 1963 (not organized)

Organized on 1 July 1963
Redesignated 779th Troop Carrier Squadron on 1 March 1966
Redesignated 779th Tactical Airlift Squadron on 1 May 1967
Inactivated on 31 August 1971

- Redesignated 779th Expeditionary Airlift Squadron and converted to provisional status c. 3 May 2002

Activated unknown date
Inactivated 15 April 2006

=== Assignments ===
- 464th Bombardment Group, 1 August 1943 – 31 July 1945
- 464th Troop Carrier Group, 1 February 1953 – 1 August 1957
- 464th Troop Carrier Wing (later 464th Tactical Airlift Wing), 1 July 1963 – 31 August 1971 (attached to 315th Air Division 7 February 1968 – 31 March 1968)
- Air Mobility Command to activate or inactivate as needed c. 3 May 2002

721st Air Mobility Operations Group, unknown – 15 April 2006

=== Stations ===
- Wendover Field, Utah, 1 August 1943
- Gowen Field, Idaho, 22 August 1943
- Pocatello Army Air Field, Idaho, 2 October 1943 – 9 February 1944
- Pantanella Airfield, Italy, 10 April 1944
- Gioia del Colle Airfield, Italy, 20 April 1944
- Pantanella Airfield, Italy, c. 1 June 1944-c. 6 June 1945
- Waller Field, Trinidad, 15 June-31 July 1945
- Pope Air Force Base, North Carolina, 8 June 1955 – 1 August 1957
- Pope Air Force Base, North Carolina, 1 July 1963 – 31 August 1971
- Ramstein Air Base, Germany, unknown – 15 April 2006
- Ali Al Salem Air Base, Kuwait, ~2018 – 2 November 2021

=== Aircraft ===
- Consolidated B-24 Liberator, 1943–1945
- Fairchild C-119 Flying Boxcar, 1953–1958
- Fairchild C-123 Provider 1963–1966
- Lockheed C-130 Hercules, 1966–1971 & 2018–2021

=== Awards and campaigns ===
Award streamer	Award	Dates	Notes
	Distinguished Unit Citation	8 July 1944	Vienna, Austria, 779th Bombardment Squadron
	Distinguished Unit Citation	24 August 1944	Pardubice, Czechoslovakia, 779th Bombardment Squadron
	Air Force Outstanding Unit Award with Combat "V" Device	1 July 1967-10 April 1968	779th Tactical Airlift Squadron
	Republic of Vietnam Gallantry Cross with Palm	1 July 1967-10 April 1968	779th Tactical Airlift Squadron

Campaign Streamer	Campaign	Dates	Notes
	Rome-Arno	10 April 1944 – 9 September 1944	779th Bombardment Squadron
	Southern France	15 August 1944 – 14 September 1944	779th Bombardment Squadron
	Northern France	25 July 1944 – 14 September 1944	779th Bombardment Squadron
	North Apennines	10 September 1944 – 4 April 1945	779th Bombardment Squadron
	Po Valley	3 April 1945 – 8 May 1945	779th Bombardment Squadron
	Vietnam Air/Ground	22 January 1968 – 7 July 1968	779th Tactical Airlift Squadron
	Vietnam Air Offensive, Phase III	1 April 1968 – 31 October 1968	779th Tactical Airlift Squadron
	Vietnam Air Offensive, Phase IV	1 November 1968 – 22 February 1969	779th Tactical Airlift Squadron

== See also ==
- List of United States Air Force squadrons
