= Simisini Air Base =

Military airport of Kisangani, Democratic Republic of the Congo

Kisangani Simisini Air Base Kisangani Ville Airport
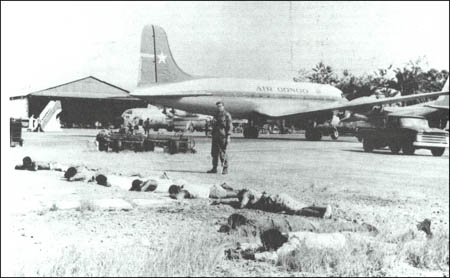
- The Airport during Operation Dragon Rouge in 1964
- IATA: none; ICAO: FZIA

Summary
- Airport type: Military
- Serves: Kisangani
- Elevation AMSL: 1,290 ft / 393 m
- Coordinates: 0°31′02″N 25°09′20″E

Map
- Location of the airport in Democratic Republic of the Congo

Runways
Direction	Length		Surface
Direction	m	ft	Surface
10/28	2,200	7,218	Asphalt
- Sources: GCM Google Maps SkyVector

Kisangani Simisini Air Base (ICAO: FZIA) is a military airport in the city of Kisangani, capital of the Tshopo Province of the Democratic Republic of the Congo.

Located in the western portion of Kisangani, 1 kilometre (0.6 mi) north of the Congo River, most of its traffic has moved to Bangoka International Airport. The airport is now a military airfield, though it also serves humanitarian flights and some private operations.

Navigation is supported by a VOR-DME and a non-directional beacon at Bangoka International Airport.

== History ==
As Kisangani Ville Airport, it was the original airport of the city, then named Stanleyville. In the turbulent times of Congo's independence and the subsequent struggles, it was the city's only airport, and was the scene of severe fighting during the Simba Rebellion and the associated Operation Dragon Rouge in 1964.

== See also ==
- Transport in the Democratic Republic of the Congo
- List of airports in the Democratic Republic of the Congo
