= 55th Fighter Wing =

55th Fighter Wing

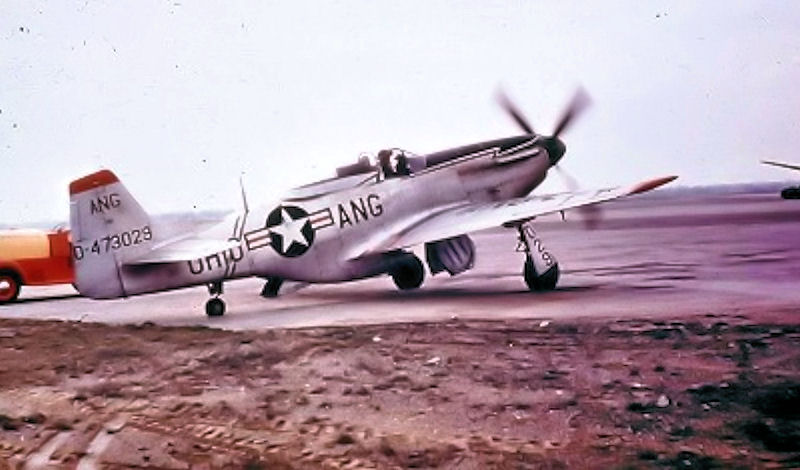
- F-51D Mustang from the Wing's 166th Fighter Squadron (Note: Aircraft is North American F-51D-25-NA Mustang serial 44-73029.)
- Active: 1943–1945; 1947-1950
- Country: United States
- Branch: United States Air Force
- Type: Wing
- Role: Command and Control
- Part of: Ohio Air National Guard
- Engagements: Mediterranean Theater of Operations

Insignia
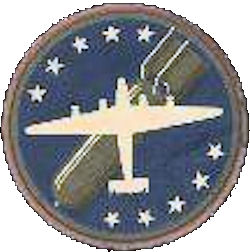
- Unofficial 55th Bombardment Wing emblem (Note: Maurer indicates the wing had no approved emblem. Maurer, Combat Units, pp. 397-398)

The 55th Fighter Wing is a disbanded unit of the United States Air Force, last stationed at Lockbourne Air Force Base, Ohio. It was withdrawn from the Ohio Air National Guard and inactivated on 31 October 1950 when the Guard adopted the Wing Base organizational model and formed the cadre for the 121st Fighter Wing.

During World War II, the wing served as the 55th Bombardment Wing in the Mediterranean Theater of Operations, flying strategic bombardment missions against areas under Axis control.

== History ==
=== World War II ===
The wing was first activated as the 55th Bombardment Operational Training Wing in March 1943 at MacDill Field, Florida. Various groups were attached to the wing for short periods for training, but none were permanently assigned.

Assigned to Fifteenth Air Force, being stationed at Bari, Italy and was inactivated on 9 September 1945.

=== Air National Guard ===
Allocated to the Ohio Air National Guard for command and control origination for units in the Ohio River Valley region of the United States. Extended federal recognition and activated on 21 August 1946.

At the end of October 1950, the Air National Guard converted to the wing-base (Hobson Plan) organization. As a result, the wing was withdrawn from the Ohio ANG and was inactivated on 31 October 1950. The 121st Fighter Wing was established by the National Guard Bureau, allocated to the state of Ohio, recognized and activated 1 November 1950; assuming the personnel, equipment and mission of the inactivated 55th Fighter Wing.

== Lineage ==
- Constituted as the 55th Bombardment Operational Training Wing (Medium) on 17 March 1943

Activated on 31 March 1943
Redesignated 55th Bombardment Wing (Medium) in October 1943
Redesignated 55th Bombardment Wing (Heavy) in December 1943
Inactivated 9 September 1945

- Redesignated 55th Fighter Wing and allotted to the National Guard on 21 August 1946

Activated and extended federal recognition on 7 December 1947
Inactivated on 31 October 1950

- Disbanded on 15 June 1983

=== Assignments ===
- III Bomber Command, 31 March 1943
- XV Bomber Command, March 1944 – 9 September 1945
- Ohio Air National Guard, 7 December 1947 – 31 October 1950

=== Stations ===
- MacDill Field, Florida, 31 March 1943 – c. February 1944
- Spinazzola Airfield, Italy, March 1944
- Bari Airfield, Italy, c. July – September 1945
- Lockbourne Air Force Base, Ohio, 7 December 1947 – 31 October 1950

=== Components ===
==== World War II ====
- 460th Bombardment Group, c. 5 February 1944 – 15 June 1945
- 461st Bombardment Group, 5 February 1944 – 15 June 1945
- 464th Bombardment Group, 2 October 1943 – 31 June 1945
- 465th Bombardment Group, 1 April 1944 – 15 June 1945
- 485th Bombardment Group, 1 April 1944 May-15 May 1945

==== Ohio Air National Guard ====
- 121st Fighter Group, 26 June 1948 – 31 October 1950
- 122d Fighter Group, 7 December 1947 – 31 October 1950 (Indiana ANG)
- 123d Fighter Group, 7 December 1947 – 10 October 1950 (Kentucky ANG)
- 112th Bombardment Squadron (Light), 7 December 1947 – 31 October 1950
- 149th Fighter Squadron, 21 June 1947 – 31 October 1950 (Virginia ANG)
- 162d Fighter Squadron, 7 December 1947 – 26 June 1948
- 164th Fighter Squadron, 20–26 June 1948
- 166th Fighter Squadron, 10 November 1947 – 26 June 1948
- 167th Fighter Squadron, 7 March 1957 – 10 October 1950 (West Virginia ANG)
