= San Isidro Air Base =

San Isidro Air Base Base Aérea de San Isidro
- IATA: none; ICAO: MDSI

Summary
- Airport type: Military
- Operator: Dominican Air Force
- Built: 1953
- Occupants: Comando Aéreo
- Elevation AMSL: 112 ft / 34 m
- Coordinates: 18°30′10″N 69°45′45″W

Map
- Location of the airport in the Dominican Republic

Runways
Direction	Length		Surface
Direction	m	ft	Surface
03/21	2,134	7,000	Asphalt
- Source: GCM Google Maps

The San Isidro Air Base (Spanish: Base Aérea de San Isidro) (ICAO: MDSI) became operational on March 23, 1953, and is located 25 km east of Santo Domingo. It was named Base Aérea Trujillo until 1961, when the name was changed to San Isidro. Most of the units, aircraft, and helicopters of the Dominican Air Force are based there.

The San Isidro track also has been a venue for automobile racing events.

The Punta Caucedo VOR/DME (Ident: CDO) is located 6.8 nautical miles (12.6 km) west of the airport. The San Isidro VOR/DME (Ident: SIS) is located on the field.

== See also ==
- Transport in the Dominican Republic
- List of airports in the Dominican Republic
