= Lawson Army Airfield =

United States military installation

Lawson Army Airfield (Fort Benning)
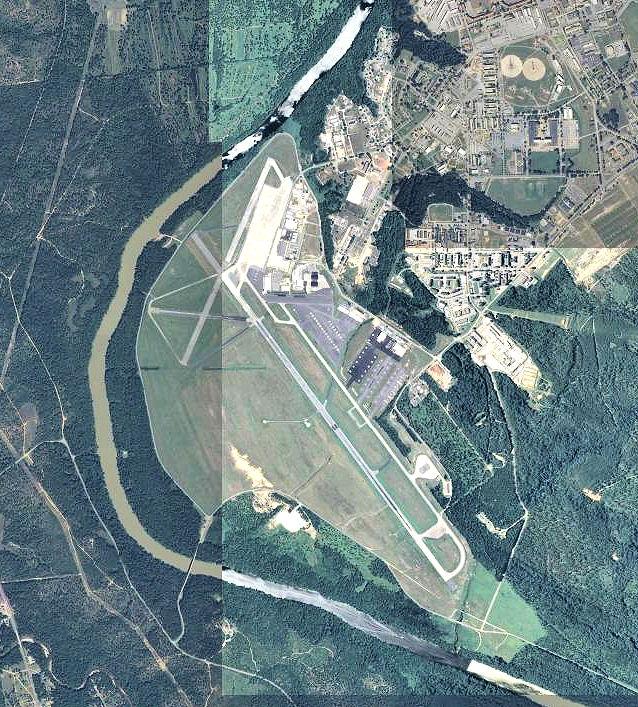
- 2006 USGS airphoto
- IATA: LSF; ICAO: KLSF; FAA LID: LSF

Summary
- Airport type: Military
- Owner: United States Army
- Location: Fort Benning; Columbus, Georgia
- Elevation AMSL: 232 ft (71 m)
- Coordinates: 32°20′14″N 084°59′29″W

Map
- Location of Lawson Army Airfield

Runways
Direction	Length		Surface
Direction	ft	m	Surface
15/33	10,000	3,048	Asphalt
- Source: Federal Aviation Administration

Lawson Army Airfield (IATA: LSF, ICAO: KLSF, FAA LID: LSF) is a military airport located at Fort Benning in Chattahoochee County, Georgia, south of the city of Columbus, Georgia. It is Fort Benning's primary force projection platform.

== Facilities ==
Lawson Army Airfield has one runway:

- Runway 15/33: 10,000 ft. x 150 ft. (3,048 x 46 m), Surface: Asphalt

== History ==
=== Origins ===
In late 1918, the U.S. Army established a new camp for the Infantry School of Arms south of Columbus on the Bussey Plantation. The camp was named in honor of Henry Lewis Benning, a Columbus native who served as a Confederate general during the American Civil War and later as a justice of the Georgia Supreme Court. The Army created a rudimentary landing field at Benning in 1919 with the initial mission of determining if data obtained by balloon observation would benefit the infantry. The airfield consisted of two small hangars that housed the balloon unit.

In 1922, the Army made the facility a permanent Army post renaming the camp Fort Benning. From 1921 to 1931, aircraft from Maxwell Field near Montgomery, Alabama occasionally utilized the airfield for maneuvers and other purposes. In 1928, the balloon unit transferred and the airfield was without any permanent occupation for three years.

In August 1931, the Army named the airfield in honor of Capt. Walter R. Lawson, a Georgia native who had been killed in the crash of a Martin MB-2 at McCook Field, Ohio on 21 April 1923. Lawson served with the 41st French Escadrille during World War I, had one victory, and received the Distinguished Flying Cross for heroism in action. The same year, Flight B of Ft. Riley, Kansas' 16th Observation Squadron, consisting of five officers and 35 enlisted men, moved to Lawson. Flight B operated three Douglas 0-25 aircraft out of a double hangar. Units from Fort Bragg, North Carolina later joined Flight B. The mission of Flight B involved directing artillery fire and spotting enemy positions during maneuvers.

In 1933, the Army spent $855,060 upgrading Lawson's facilities. On 1 September 1940, Lawson Field separated from the Infantry School and became an Army Airfield under the Commanding General of the Army Air Corps. By the fall of 1940, the 16th Reconnaissance Squadron, the 97th Tactical Reconnaissance Squadron and the 15th Bombardment Squadron (Light) had been transferred to the field.

=== World War II ===
During 1941, as the Army Air Corps transitioned to the U.S. Army Air Forces, a major project took place at Lawson with the construction of barracks, runways, parking aprons and other facilities. Several additional observation, reconnaissance, and light bomber squadrons passed through Lawson during 1941 and the first of 1942. The 74th Observation Group (27 February 1942 – 10 April 1942) Trained personnel in aerial reconnaissance, medium bombardment, and fighter techniques.

The continued growth of parachute training at Lawson led the Army to turn the field over to the I Troop Carrier Command on 26 August 1942. The 316th Troop Carrier Group (TCG) with four C-47 squadrons had already arrived at Lawson on 8 August.

Other Army Air Force Troop Carrier C-47 units assigned to Lawson during World War II were:

- 314th Troop Carrier Group (20 February 1943 – May 1943)
- 63d Troop Carrier Group (7 May 1943 – 3 June 1943)
- 10th Troop Carrier Group (30 November 1943 – 21 January 1944)
- 438th Troop Carrier Group (1 October – 15 November 1945) (Used Lawson for unit inactivation)

For all of the war, a Troop Carrier Group (TCG) was always present at Lawson conducting training and providing aircraft for the Parachute School. In June 1943, the 10th TCG became a Replacement Training Unit in addition to the mission of dropping troopers for the Parachute School. The 3rd Composite Squadron was also present at Lawson from April 1942 to November 1945 with a wide variety of fighter, light bombers, and liaison/observation aircraft to provide aerial support for training by the Infantry School.

Lawson and Ft. Benning had many distinguished visitors during the war including Gen. George C. Marshall, Gen. Hap Arnold, Lord Louis Mountbatten and Anthony Eden, the British Foreign Secretary. When President Franklin Roosevelt visited the base on 15 April 1943, the School conducted a parachute drop for his viewing.

Fort Benning and Lawson Field

=== Postwar use ===
Following the war, Troop Carrier Squadrons remained at Lawson in support of the Parachute School with the C-46. Lawson Air Force Base came into existence in 1947 with the creation of the United States Air Force. Postwar Air Force units assigned were:

- 434th Troop Carrier Wing (23 January 1952 – 1 February 1953) Curtiss C-46 Commando
- 464th Troop Carrier Wing (1 February 1953 – 21 September 1954) C-119 Flying Boxcar

In 1954, the Air Force turned Lawson over to the Army, and it has operated continually since that time as Lawson Army Airfield.

Lawson received a major expansion program in 1965 including an 8,200-ft. runway capable of handling large jet transports.

In 1967, Lawson Army Airfield was used for filming as part of the production of The Green Berets (film). It served as a stand-in for Da Nang Air Base, South Vietnam.

Presently Army aviation assets at Lawson support the Infantry School and other units stationed at Fort Benning.

On 9 January 2025, Special Air Mission 39 flew the casket of the late President Jimmy Carter from Andrews Air Force Base in Camp Springs, MD to Lawson Army Airfield after his state funeral in Washington D.C.

== See also ==
- Georgia World War II Army Airfields
- I Troop Carrier Command
