= 15th Airlift Squadron =

15th Airlift Squadron

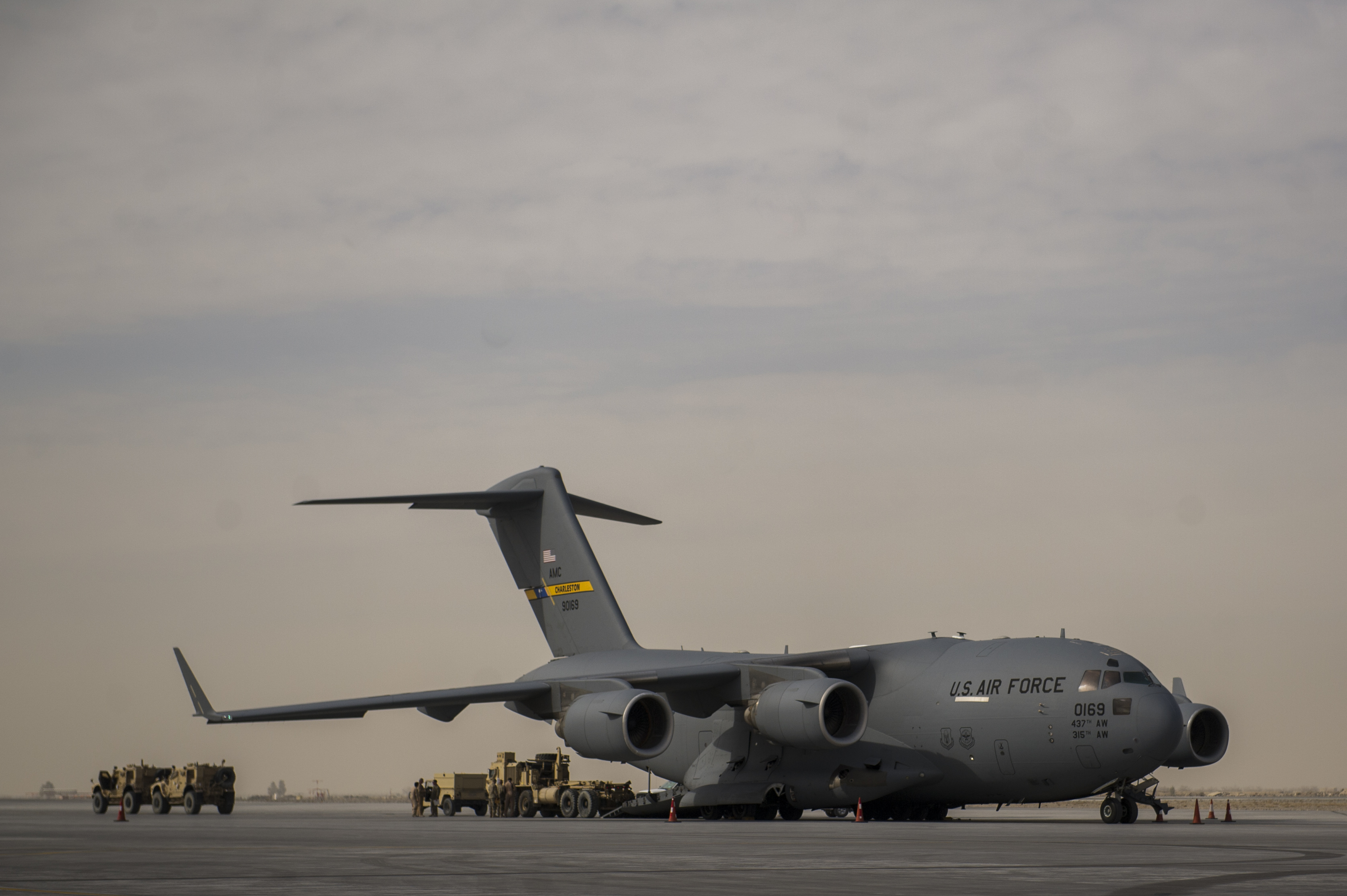
- A 437th Airlift Wing C-17A Globemaster III deployed to Kandahar Airfield, Afghanistan
- Active: 1940–1945; 1946–1993; 1993–present
- Country: United States
- Branch: United States Air Force
- Role: Airlift
- Part of: Air Mobility Command
- Garrison/HQ: Charleston Air Force Base
- Nickname: Global Eagles
- Engagements: Mediterranean Theater of Operations; European Theater of Operations; Korean War
- Decorations: Distinguished Unit Citation; Air Force Outstanding Unit Award; Republic of Korea Presidential Unit Citation; Republic of Vietnam Gallantry Cross with Palm

Insignia
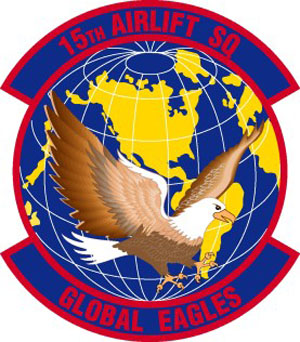
- 15th Airlift Squadron emblem (approved 14 June 1977)

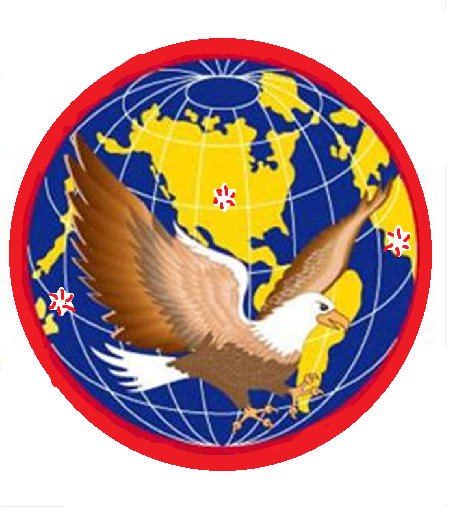
- 15th Troop Carrier Squadron emblem (Note: Approved 16 July 1952. Description: On a terrestrial sphere, light blue, with land markings yellow, longitude and latitude lines white, an American Bald Eagle flying, in natural colors, on the sphere three eight-pointed stars white, shaded red, all within a piping red, and border dark blue.)
- World War II Fuselage marking: Y9

The 15th Airlift Squadron is part of the 437th Airlift Wing at Charleston Air Force Base, South Carolina. It operates Boeing C-17 Globemaster III aircraft supporting the United States Air Force global reach mission worldwide.

== Mission ==
The 15th Airlift Squadron, "Global Eagles", provides combat-ready C-17 aircrews for strategic airlift missions worldwide. The squadron is tasks include emergency nuclear airlift, Presidential support and humanitarian relief efforts.

== History ==
=== World War II ===
Constituted as the 15th Transport Squadron on 20 Nov 1940. Activated on 4 Dec 1940 at Duncan Field, Texas, and was assigned to the 61st Transport Group (later 61st Troop Carrier Group). The squadron flew the Douglas C-33 and then Douglas C-39 between 1941 and 1942. Converted to Douglas C-47 Skytrains in early 1942, trained under I Troop Carrier Command for combat operations. Redesignated 15th Troop Carrier Squadron on 4 Jul 1942.

=== Post World War II ===
Reactivated on 30 Sep 1946 at Eschborn Air Base, Germany. Then, relocated to Rhein-Main Air Base, Germany, on 9 February 1947, it was redesignated as the 15th Troop Carrier Squadron, Medium, on 1 July 1948.

The 15th moved to McChord Air Force Base, Washington, on 26 July 1950, before relocating to Ashiya Air Base, Japan on 13 December 1950. During the Korean War it provided aerial transportation from the US to Japan, from August–December 1950, and between Japan and Korea, from 13 December 1950-November 1952. The squadron relocated from Tachikawa Air Base, Japan, relocating there on 26 March 1952, to Larson Air Force Base, Washington on 21 November 1952. During 1952 also saw the 15th transition to the Douglas C-124 Globemaster II aircraft, and the following year, the squadron was tasked was tasked with providing worldwide airlift.

The squadron moved to Donaldson Air Force Base, South Carolina on 25 August 1954, before being reassigned to the 63d Troop Carrier Group on 8 October 1959, and to the 63d Troop Carrier Wing (later, 63rd Military Airlift) Wing, on 18 January 1963. The unit relocated to Hunter Air Force Base, Georgia, on 1 April 1963. The squadron was redesignated as the 15th Military Airlift Squadron on 8 January 1966.

=== Global airlift ===
The 15th relocated to Norton Air Force Base, California, on 1 April 1967. That same year, it transitioned to the Lockheed C-141 Starlifter. The squadron was reassigned to the 63d Military Airlift Group on 1 October 1978; and to the 63rd Military Airlift Wing on 1 July 1980. The squadron provided airlift to Southeast Asia, 1966–1973; and to Grenada, Operation Urgent Fury, from October–November 1983; to Panama, Operation Just Cause, from 18 December 1989 – 8 January 1990; and to Southwest Asia, from August 1990-January 1991.

Redesignated the 15th Airlift Squadron on 1 January 1992 under the 63rd Operations Group, the 15th inactivated on 26 July 1993.

The squadron reactivated on 1 October 1993 at Charleston Air Force Base, South Carolina, and was assigned to the 437th Operations Group. The 15th received its first McDonnell Douglas C-17 Globemaster III in June 1993.

== Lineage ==
- Constituted as the 15th Transport Squadron on 20 November 1940

Activated on 4 December 1940
Redesignated 15th Troop Carrier Squadron on 4 July 1942
Inactivated on 31 July 1945

- Activated on 30 September 1946

Redesignated 15th Troop Carrier Squadron, Medium on 1 July 1948
Redesignated 15th Troop Carrier Squadron, Heavy on 15 August 1948
Redesignated 15th Military Airlift Squadron on 8 January 1966
Redesignated 15th Airlift Squadron on 1 January 1992
Inactivated on 26 July 1993

- Activated on 1 October 1993

=== Assignments ===
- 61st Transport Group (later 61st Troop Carrier Group), 4 December 1940 – 31 July 1945
- 61st Troop Carrier Group, 30 September 1946
- 63d Troop Carrier Group, 8 October 1959
- 63d Troop Carrier Wing (later 63d Military Airlift Wing), 18 January 1963
- 63d Military Airlift Group, 1 October 1978
- 63d Military Airlift Wing, 1 July 1980
- 63d Operations Group, 1 January 1992 – 26 July 1993
- 437th Operations Group, 1 October 1993 – present

=== Stations ===
- Duncan Field, Texas, 4 December 1940
- Augusta Airport, Georgia, 12 July 1941
- Pope Field, North Carolina, 24 May 1942
- Lubbock Army Air Field, Texas, 15 November 1942
- Pope Field, North Carolina, 26 February–30 April 1943
- Lourmel Airfield, Algeria, 15 May 1943
- Kairouan Airfield, Tunisia, 21 June 1943
- Licata Airfield, Sicily, 3 September 1943
- Sciacca Airfield, Sicily, 6 October 1943 – 12 February 1944
- RAF Barkston Heath (AAF-483), England, 18 February 1944
- Abbeville/Drucat Airfield (B-92), France, 13 March–19 May 1945
- Waller Field, Trinidad, 19 May–31 July 1945
- AAF Station Eschborn, Germany, 30 September 1946
- AAF Station Frankfurt (later Rhein-Main Air Base), Germany, 9 February 1947 – 21 July 1950
- McChord Air Force Base, Washington, 26 July–4 December 1950
- Ashiya Air Base, Japan, 13 December 1950
- Tachikawa Air Base, Japan, 26 March–18 November 1952
- Larson Air Force Base, Washington, 21 November 1952
- Donaldson Air Force Base, South Carolina, 25 August 1954
- Hunter Air Force Base, Georgia, 1 April 1963
- Norton Air Force Base, California, 1 April 1967 – 26 July 1993
- Charleston Air Force Base (later Joint Base Charleston), South Carolina, 1 October 1993 – present

=== Aircraft ===
- Douglas C-33 (1941)
- Douglas C-39 (1941–1942)
- Douglas C-47 Skytrain (1942–1945, 1946–1948)
- Douglas C-54 Skymaster (1948–1952)
- Douglas C-124 Globemaster II (1952–1967)
- Lockheed C-141 Starlifter (1967–1997)
- Boeing C-17 Globemaster III (1997–present)

=== Awards and campaigns ===
- Campaigns. World War II: Sicily; Naples-Foggia; Normandy; Northern France; Rhineland; Central Europe. Korea: CCF Intervention; First UN Counteroffensive; CCF Spring Offensive; UN Summer-Fall Offensive; Second Korean Winter; Korean Summer-Fall, 1952.
- Decorations. Distinguished Unit Citations: Sicily, 11 July 1943; France, [6–7] Jun 1944; Korea, 13 December 1950 – 21 April 1951. Air Force Outstanding Unit Awards: 1 July 1957 – 10 December 1962; 1 July 1968 – 30 June 1969; 1 July 1970 – 30 June 1971; 1 June 1978 – 31 May 1980; 1 Jan-31 Dec 1983; 1 Jan-31 Dec 1987; 1 January 1990 – 30 April 1991. Republic of Korea Presidential Unit Citation: 1 Jul 1951–[18 Nov 1952]. Republic of Vietnam Gallantry Cross with Palm: 1 April 1966 – 8 January 1973.
