= 53rd Airlift Squadron =

53d Airlift Squadron

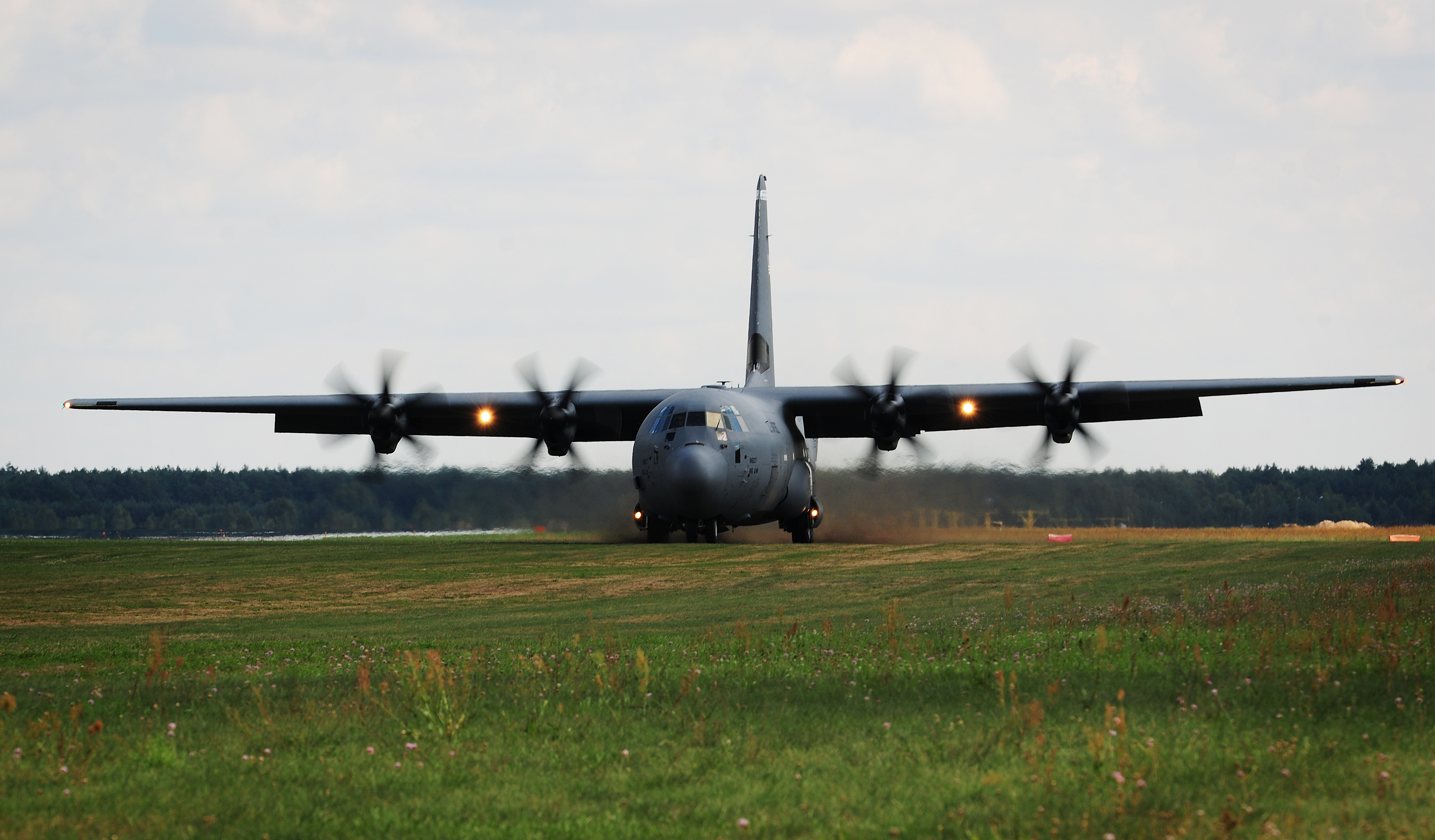
- C-130J Super Hercules lands on an unimproved runway
- Active: 1942–1945; 1946–1966; 1972–1993; 1993–2008; 2008–2016
- Country: United States
- Branch: United States Air Force
- Role: Airlift
- Part of: Air Mobility Command
- Garrison/HQ: Little Rock Air Force Base
- Nickname: Blackjack
- Motto: Primus Cum Plurimi Latin First with the Most (1953-present)
- Engagements: European Theater of Operations; Mediterranean Theater of Operations; Korean War
- Decorations: Distinguished Unit Citation; Air Force Outstanding Unit Award; Republic of Korea Presidential Unit Citation; Republic of Vietnam Gallantry Cross with Palm

Insignia
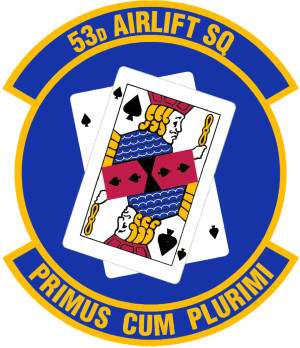
- 53d Airlift Squadron emblem (Note: Approved 9 December 1994.)

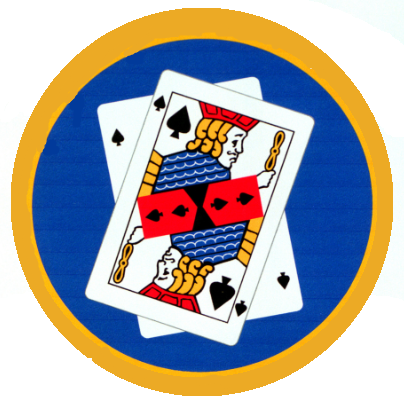
- 53d Airlift Squadron emblem (Note: Approved 10 September 1953.)

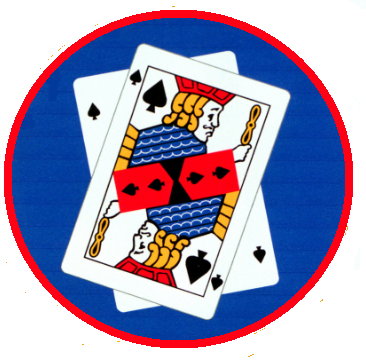
- 53d Airlift Squadron emblem

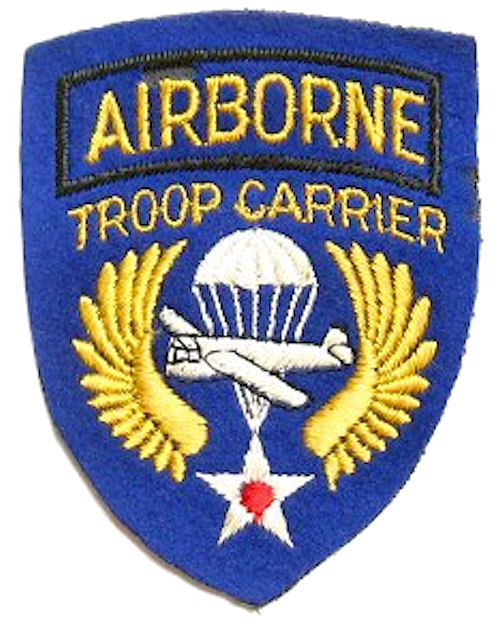
- 53d Troop Carrier Squadron emblem (D-Day WWII)

The 53d Airlift Squadron is an inactive United States Air Force unit, last part of the 19th Airlift Wing at Little Rock Air Force Base, Arkansas. It operated Lockheed C-130 Hercules aircraft for airlift and airdrop operations.

The squadron was first activated in June 1942 as the 53d Troop Carrier Squadron. After training in the United States, it deployed to the Mediterranean Theater of Operations, where it participated in the airborne assault on Sicily, for which it earned a Distinguished Unit Citation (DUC). It moved to England, where it participated in the D Day airborne assault, for which it earned a second DUC, and in Operation Market Garden, the attempt to secure a bridgehead across the Rhine River in the Netherlands. 53d TCS assigned C-47's during the D-Day operations utilized the 3A fuselage code. Following V-E Day, it participated in the movement of American troops back to the United States before inactivating in July 1945.

The squadron was reactivated in France in 1946, moving to Germany, where it participated in the Berlin Airlift. It returned to the United States in 1950, but soon deployed to Japan, where it provided airlift during the Korean War. The squadron was inactivated in 1966, but reactivated as the 53d Military Airlift Squadron in 1972. Except for a brief period of inactivation in 1993, it has been a strategic airlift unit since then.

== History ==
=== World War II ===
Constituted as 53 Transport Squadron on 30 May 1942 and activated on 1 June 1942 with C-47s at Pope Field, NC. 2 Lt Glen A. Myers was the unit's first commanding officer.

Assigned to I Troop Carrier Command as a troop carrier squadron, trained in the United States. Assigned to Twelfth Air Force and deployed North Africa during May 1943. The squadron's aircraft flew supplies to front-line units in Algeria and Tunisia during the North African Campaign as soon as suitable landing strips were available and evacuated casualties back to rear area field hospitals. Redesignated 53 Troop Carrier Squadron on 4 July 1942.

Squadron engaged in combat operations, dropping airborne units into Sicily during the Operation Husky invasion and later into areas around Anzio, Italy as part of Operation Shingle, the invasion of mainland Italy and the initiation of the Italian Campaign, January 1944. Moved north through Italy, in 1943 in support of Allied ground forces, evacuated wounded personnel and flew missions behind enemy lines in Italy and the Balkans to haul guns, ammunition, food, clothing, medical supplies, and other materials to the partisans and to drop propaganda leaflets.

Was moved to England in February 1944, assigned to IX Troop Carrier Command. Prepared for the invasion of Nazi-occupied Europe. In June 1944, subordinate units dropped paratroops in Normandy, subsequently flying numerous missions to bring in reinforcements and needed supplies. 53rd TCS assigned C-47's during the D-Day operations utilized the 3A fuselage code. During the airborne attack on The Netherlands (Operation Market Garden, September 1944), the squadron dropped paratroops, towed gliders, and flew resupply missions. Several of its subordinate units also participated in the invasion of southern France in August 1944. The 50th supported the 101st Airborne Division in the Battle of the Bulge by towing gliders full of supplies near Bastogne on 27 December 1944.

When the Allies made the air assault across the Rhine River in March 1945, each aircraft towed two gliders with troops of the 17th Airborne Division and released them near Wesel. The squadron also hauled food, clothing, medicine, gasoline, ordnance equipment, and other supplies to the front lines and evacuated patients to rear zone hospitals.

In late May 1945, after V-E Day, the squadron was moved to Waller Field, Trinidad and attached to Air Transport Command. From Trinidad, the squadron ferried returning military personnel to Morrison Field, Florida, where they were sent on to other bases or prepared for separation after the war. Redesignated 53 Troop Carrier Squadron, Medium, on 1 July 1948 and 53 Troop Carrier Squadron, Heavy, on 15 Aug 1948.

=== Berlin airlift ===
The squadron participated in the Berlin Airlift, 1948–1949.

=== Korean war ===
It conducted aerial transportation from the U.S. to Japan from August–December 1950, and between Japan and Korea from 13 December 1950 – November 1952.

=== Airlift operations ===
It conducted worldwide airlift operations from 1953 to 1966, including resupply to Antarctica from 1957 to 1958, and missions to Southeast Asia during the Vietnam War. Redesignated 53 Military Airlift Squadron on 8 January 1966. Inactivated, on 8 July 1966. Reactivated on 8 January 1972 and converted to C-141 Starlifters.

The 53d again conducted worldwide airlift from 1972 to 1993 flying missions into Grenada, 23 October 1983 – 9 November 1983, during the invasion of Panama, 20 December 1989, and to Southwest Asia, August 1990 – June 1991. Redesignated 53 Airlift Squadron on 1 January 1992. Inactivated on 30 Apr 1993. Activated on 1 Oct 1993 with C-130 Hercules, as a training unit. The squadron was inactivated 11 January 2008 and detached from AETC. It was reactivated on 15 May 2008 as a part of the 19th Airlift Wing. providing worldwide airlift capability until formal inactivation on 30 September 2016.

== Lineage ==
- Constituted as the 53d Transport Squadron on 30 May 1942

Activated on 1 June 1942
Redesignated 53d Troop Carrier Squadron on 4 July 1942
Inactivated on 31 July 1945

- Activated on 30 September 1946

Redesignated 53d Troop Carrier Squadron, Medium on 1 July 1948
Redesignated 53d Troop Carrier Squadron, Heavy on 15 August 1948
Redesignated 53d Military Airlift Squadron on 8 January 1966
Discontinued and inactivated on 8 July 1966

- Activated on 8 January 1972

Redesignated 53d Airlift Squadron on 1 January 1992
Inactivated on 30 April 1993

- Activated on 1 October 1993

Inactivated on 11 January 2008

- Activated on 15 May 2008

Inactivated 30 September 2016

=== Assignments ===
- 61st Transport Group (later 61st Troop Carrier Group), 1 June 1942 – 31 July 1945
- 61st Troop Carrier Group, 30 September 1946 (attached to Airlift Task Force, Provisional, August 1958 – February 1959, February–July 1960, and 5 January 1961 – April 1962)
- 63d Troop Carrier Group, 8 October 1959
- 63d Troop Carrier Wing (later 63d Military Airlift Wing), 18 January 1963 – 8 July 1966
- 63d Military Airlift Wing, 8 January 1972
- 63d Military Airlift Group, 1 October 1978
- 63d Military Airlift Wing, 1 July 1980
- 63d Operations Group, 1 January 1992 – 30 April 1993
- 314th Operations Group, 1 October 1993 – 11 January 2008
- 463d Airlift Group, 15 May 2008 – 1 October 2008
- 19th Operations Group, 1 October 2008 – 30 September 2016

=== Stations ===
- Sedalia Army Air Field, Missouri, 23 October 1942
- Lubbock Army Air Field, Texas, 15 November 1942
- Pope Field, North Carolina, 26 Feb-30 Apr 1943
- Lourmel Airfield, Algeria, 15 May 1943
- Kairouan Airfield, Tunisia, 21 June 1943
- Licata Airfield, Sicily, 3 September 1943
- Sciacca Airfield, Sicily, 6 Oct 1943 – 12 Feb 1944
- RAF Barkston Heath (AAF-483), England, 18 February 1944
- Abbeville/Drucat Airfield (B-92), France, 13 Mar-19 May 1945
- Waller Field, Trinidad, 29 May-31 Jul 1945
- Orly Field, France, 30 September 1946
- AAF Station Eschborn, Germany, 14 December 1946
- AAF Station Frankfurt, Germany, 8 August 1947
- Tempelhof Air Base, Germany, 20 January 1948
- Rhein-Main Air Base, Germany, 22 April 1948 – 21 July 1950
- McChord Air Force Base, Washington, 26 July–12 December 1950
- Ashiya Air Base, Japan, 13 December 1950
- Johnson Air Base, Japan, 13 September–18 November 1952
- Larson Air Force Base, Washington, 21 November 1952
- Donaldson Air Force Base, South Carolina, 21 August 1954 (deployed at Rhein-Main Air Base, Germany, August 1958 – February 1959, February–July 1960, and 5 January 1961 – April 1962)
- Hunter Air Force Base, Georgia, 1 April 1963 – 8 July 1966
- Norton Air Force Base, California, 8 January 1972 – 30 April 1993
- Little Rock Air Force Base, Arkansas, 1 October 1993 – 11 January 2008
- Little Rock Air Force Base, Arkansas, 15 May 2008 – 30 September 2016

=== Aircraft ===
- Douglas C-47 Skytrain (1942–1945)
- Curtiss C-46 Commando (1946–1948)
- Douglas C-54 Skymaster (1948–1952)
- Douglas C-124 Globemaster II (1952–1966)
- Lockheed C-141 Starlifter (1972–1993)
- Lockheed C-130 Hercules (1993–2016)
