= 14th Airlift Squadron =

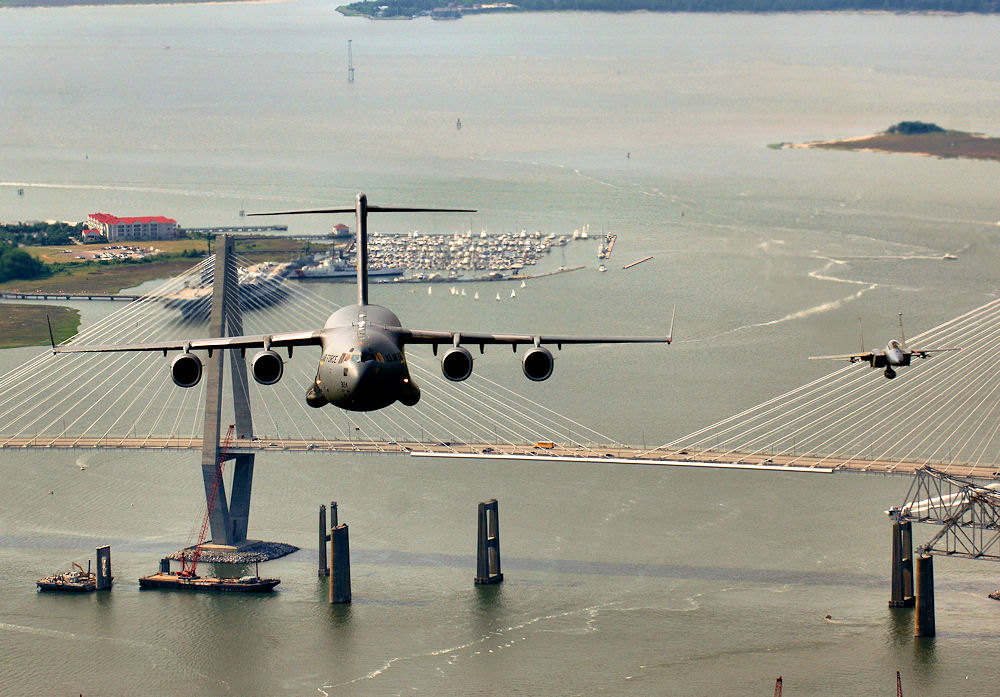
- A C-17 Globemaster III from Charleston AFB flies over the USS Yorktown and the Ravenel Bridge near Charleston, South Carolina
- Active: 1940–1945; 1946–present
- Country: United States
- Branch: United States Air Force
- Role: Airlift
- Size: ~172 Members
- Part of: Air Mobility Command
- Garrison/HQ: Charleston Air Force Base
- Nickname: The Pelicans
- Motto: Once a Pelican ... Always a Pelican!
- Mascot: Pelican
- Engagements: Mediterranean Theater of Operations; Korean War
- Decorations: Distinguished Unit Citation; Air Force Outstanding Unit Award; Republic of Korea Presidential Unit Citation; Republic of Vietnam Gallantry Cross with Palm

Commanders
- Current commander: Lt Col Daniel P. Holder (Pelican 01)
- Notable commanders: Gen Darren W. McDew, Lt Gen Samuel D. Cox, Lt Gen Ricky N. Rupp, Brig Gen Steven A. Roser, Brig Gen Joseph M. Reheiser

Insignia
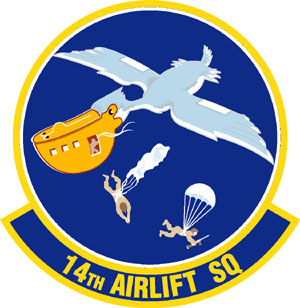
- 14th Airlift Squadron emblem (approved 28 December 1942)

The 14th Airlift Squadron (the Pelicans) is an active unit of the United States Air Force, assigned to the 437th Airlift Wing, Air Mobility Command. It is based at Joint Base Charleston, South Carolina. The squadron operates Boeing C-17 Globemaster III aircraft supporting the United States Air Force's global reach mission worldwide.

== Mission ==
The 14th Airlift Squadron "Pelicans" provide combat-ready Boeing C-17A Globemaster III aircrews for worldwide airlift missions supporting Department of Defense and National Command Authority directives. They conduct airdrop and airland operations supporting global contingencies for combatant commanders by projecting and sustaining combat forces directly into theater drop zones and austere airfields.

"Pelicans" perform emergency nuclear airlift, aeromedical evacuation & humanitarian relief missions in the technologically advanced, $262.7M C-17A airlift aircraft in all phases of ground and flight activity.

== History ==
=== World War II ===
Activated in December 1940 flying converted Douglas DC-2 transport aircraft as a GHQ Air Force transport squadron. Converted to Douglas C-47 Skytrains in early 1942, trained under I Troop Carrier Command for combat operations. Assigned to Twelfth Air Force and deployed North Africa during May 1943. The squadron's aircraft flew supplies to front-line units in Algeria and Tunisia during the North African Campaign as soon as suitable landing strips were available and evacuated casualties back to rear area field hospitals.

Squadron engaged in combat operations, dropping airborne units into Sicily during Operation Husky and later into areas around Anzio, Italy as part of Operation Shingle, the invasion of mainland Italy and the initiation of the Italian Campaign, January 1944. Moved north through Italy, in 1943 in support of Allied ground forces, evacuated wounded personnel and flew missions behind enemy lines in Italy and the Balkans to haul guns, ammunition, food, clothing, medical supplies, and other materials to the partisans and to drop propaganda leaflets.

Moved to England in February 1944, assigned to IX Troop Carrier Command. Prepared for the invasion of Nazi-occupied Europe. In June 1944, subordinate units dropped paratroops in Normandy, subsequently flying numerous missions to bring in reinforcements and needed supplies. During the airborne attack on The Netherlands (Operation Market Garden, September 1944), the squadron dropped paratroops, towed gliders, and flew resupply missions. Several of its subordinate units also participated in the invasion of southern France in August 1944. The 50th supported the 101st Airborne Division in the Battle of the Bulge by towing gliders full of supplies near Bastogne on 27 December 1944.

When the Allies made the air assault across the Rhine River in March 1945, each aircraft towed two gliders with troops of the 17th Airborne Division and released them near Wesel. The squadron also hauled food, clothing, medicine, gasoline, ordnance equipment, and other supplies to the front lines and evacuated patients to rear zone hospitals.

In late May 1945, after V-E Day, the squadron was moved to Waller Field, Trinidad and attached to Air Transport Command. From Trinidad, the squadron ferried returning military personnel to Morrison Field, Florida, where they were sent on to other bases or prepared for separation after the war.

=== Berlin Airlift ===
During the Cold War the 14th was involved in the Berlin Airlift from 1948 to 1949.

An accident occurred to 2 C-47 of the squadron in the French Alps in January 1948; see Cheval Blanc Mountain.

=== Korean War ===
Conducted aerial transport from the U.S. to Japan, August – December 1950, and between Japan and Korea, 16 November 1951 – 1 December 1952.

=== Strategic airlift ===
Conducted worldwide airlift since 1953, including to Southeast Asia from 1966 to 1973 and supporting military operations in Grenada, October–November 1983, Panama, 18 December 1989 – 8 January 1990, and to Southwest Asia, August 1990 – January 1991.

=== Operations and decorations ===
- Combat Operations. World War II: Included airborne assaults on Sicily, Normandy, the Netherlands, and Germany; aerial transportation in MTO and ETO. Berlin Airlift, 1948–1949. Korea: Aerial transportation from US to Japan, Aug–Dec 1950, and between Japan and Korea, 13 December 1950 – Nov 1952. Worldwide airlift, 1953–1993, including to Southeast Asia, 1966–1973; Operation Urgent Fury (The invasion of Grenada), Oct–Nov 1983; Operation Just Cause (The invasion of Panama), 18 December 1989 – 8 January 1990; and Operation Desert Storm (The Persian Gulf War), Aug 1990 – Jan 1991. Operation Desert Storm (The Persian Gulf War); Operation Iraqi Freedom (Iraq 2003–Present); Operation Enduring Freedom (Afghanistan 2001 - August 2021); Operation Inherent Resolve (Iraq/Syria 2015 - Present).

Other operations included:

- Operation Husky
- Operation Overlord
- Operation Garden
- Operation Eagle Thrust
- Operation Homecoming
- Operation Nickle Grass
- Operation Night Reach
- Operation Babylift and Operation New Life
- Operation Urgent Fury
- Operation Just Cause
- Operation Desert Shield
- Operation Desert Storm
- Operation Provide Comfort I and II
- Operation Fiery Vigil
- Operation Provide Hope
- Operation Provide Comfort
- Operation Provide Relief
- Operation Restore Hope
- Operation Southern Watch
- Operation Provide Promise
- Operation Uphold Democracy
- Operation Support Hope
- Operation Joint Endeavor
- Operation Unified Assistance
- Operation Enduring Freedom
- Operation Iraqi Freedom/New Dawn
- Operation Inherent Resolve
- Operation Allies Refuge

- Campaigns. World War II: Sicily; Naples-Foggia; Normandy; Northern France; Rhineland; Central Europe. Korea: CCF Intervention; First UN Counteroffensive; CCF Spring Offensive; UN Summer-Fall Offensive; Second Korean Winter; Korean Summer-Fall, 1952.
- Decorations. Distinguished Unit Citations: Sicily, 11 July 1943; France, [6–7] Jun 1944; Korea, 13 December 1950 – 21 April 1951. Air Force Outstanding Unit Awards: 1 July 1957 – 10 December 1962; 1 July 1968 – 30 June 1969; 1 July 1970 – 30 June 1971; 1 June 1978 – 31 May 1980; 1 Jan-31 Dec 1983; 1 Jan-31 Dec 1987; 1 January 1990 – 30 April 1991. Republic of Korea Presidential Unit Citation: 1 Jul 1951–[18 Nov 1952]. Republic of Vietnam Gallantry Cross with Palm: 1 April 1966 – 8 January 1973.

== Lineage ==
- Constituted as the 14th Transport Squadron on 20 November 1940

Activated on 4 December 1940
Re-designated: 14th Troop Carrier Squadron on 4 July 1942
Inactivated on 31 July 1945

- Activated on 30 September 1946

Redesignated 14th Troop Carrier Squadron, Medium on 1 July 1948
Redesignated 14th Troop Carrier Squadron, Heavy on 15 August 1948
Redesignated 14th Military Airlift Squadron on 8 January 1966
Redesignated 14th Airlift Squadron on 1 January 1992

=== Assignments ===
- 61st Transport Group (later 61st Troop Carrier Group), 4 December 1940 – 31 July 1945
- 61st Troop Carrier Group, 30 September 1946 (attached to 62d Troop Carrier Group, 5 December 1950 – 16 November 1951)
- 63d Troop Carrier Group, 8 October 1959
- 63d Troop Carrier Wing (later 63d Military Airlift Wing), 18 January 1963
- 63d Military Airlift Group, 1 October 1978
- 63d Military Airlift Wing, 1 July 1980
- 63d Operations Group, 1 January 1992
- 437th Operations Group, 1 April 1992 – present

=== Stations ===
- Duncan Field, Texas, 4 December 1940
- Augusta Airport, Georgia, 12 July 1941
- Pope Field, North Carolina, 24 May 1942
- Lockbourne, Ohio, 10 Sep 1942
- Dalhart Army Air Field, Texas, 9 October 1942
- Pope Field, North Carolina, 27 February–30 April 1943
- Lourmel Airfield, Algeria, 14 May 1943
- Kairouan Airfield, Tunisia, 21 June 1943
- Licata Airfield, Sicily, Italy, 6 September 1943
- Sciacca Airfield, Sicily, Italy, 6 October 1943 – 12 February 1944
- RAF Barkston Heath (AAF-483), England, 18 February 1944
- Abbeville/Drucat Airfield (B-92), France, 13 March–19 May 1945
- Waller Field, Trinidad, 29 May–31 July 1945
- AAF Station Eschborn, Germany, 30 September 1946
- AAF Station Frankfurt, Germany, 15 January 1947 – 21 July 1950
- McChord Air Force Base, Washington, 26 July–4 December 1950
- Ashiya Air Base, Japan, 13 December 1950
- Tachikawa Air Base, Japan, 26 March–18 November 1952
- Larson Air Force Base, Washington, 21 November 1952
- Donaldson Air Force Base, South Carolina, 25 August 1954
- Hunter Air Force Base, Georgia, 1 April 1963
- Norton Air Force Base, California, 1 April 1967 – 26 July 1993
- Charleston Air Force Base, South Carolina, 1 October 1993 – present

=== Aircraft ===
- Douglas C-33 (1941)
- Douglas C-39 (1941–1942)
- Douglas C-47 Skytrain (1942–1945, 1946–1948)
- Douglas C-54 Skymaster (1948–1952)
- Douglas C-124 Globemaster II (1952–1967)
- Lockheed C-141 Starlifter (1967–1995)
- Boeing C-17 Globemaster III (1993 – present)
