= 59th Troop Carrier Squadron =

- Active: 1942-1945
- Country: United States
- Branch: United States Air Force

The 59th Troop Carrier Squadron is an inactive United States Air Force unit. It was last assigned to the 61st Troop Carrier Group, based at Waller Field, Trinidad. It was inactivated on 31 Jul 1945.

== History ==
Activated in June 1942 as a I Troop Carrier Command C-47 Skytrain troop carrier squadron, trained in the United States. Assigned to Twelfth Air Force and deployed North Africa during May 1943. The squadron's aircraft flew supplies to front-line units in Algeria and Tunisia during the North African Campaign as soon as suitable landing strips were available and evacuated casualties back to rear area field hospitals.

Squadron engaged in combat operations, dropping airborne units into Sicily during the Operation Husky invasion and later into areas around Anzio, Italy as part of Operation Shingle, the invasion of mainland Italy and the initiation of the Italian Campaign, January 1944. Moved north through Italy, in 1943 in support of Allied ground forces, evacuated wounded personnel and flew missions behind enemy lines in Italy and the Balkans to haul guns, ammunition, food, clothing, medical supplies, and other materials to the partisans and to drop propaganda leaflets.

Was moved to England in February 1944, assigned to IX Troop Carrier Command, Ninth Air Force. Prepared for the invasion of Nazi-occupied Europe. In June 1944, subordinate units dropped paratroops in Normandy, subsequently flying numerous missions to bring in reinforcements and needed supplies. During the airborne attack on the Netherlands (Operation Market Garden, September 1944), the squadron dropped paratroops, towed gliders, and flew resupply missions. Several of its subordinate units also participated in the invasion of southern France in August 1944. The 50th supported the 101st Airborne Division in the Battle of the Bulge by towing gliders full of supplies near Bastogne on 27 December 1944.

When the Allies made the air assault across the Rhine River in March 1945, each aircraft towed two gliders with troops of the 17th Airborne Division and released them near Wesel. The squadron also hauled food, clothing, medicine, gasoline, ordnance equipment, and other supplies to the front lines and evacuated patients to rear zone hospitals.

In late May 1945, after V-E Day, the squadron was moved to Waller Field, Trinidad and attached to Air Transport Command. From Trinidad, the squadron ferried returning military personnel to Morrison Field, Florida, where they were sent on to other bases or prepared for separation after the war. The squadron was inactivated in place as an administrative unit on 31 Jul 1945.

=== Operations and decorations ===
- Combat Operations. Included airborne assaults on Sicily, Normandy, the Netherlands, and Germany; aerial transportation in MTO and ETO.
- Campaigns. Sicily; Naples-Foggia; Normandy; Northern France; Rhineland; Central Europe.
- Decorations. Distinguished Unit Citations: Sicily, 11 Jul 1943; France, [6-7] Jun 1944

=== Lineage ===
- Constituted 59th Troop Carrier Squadron on 13 Oct 1942

Activated on 23 Oct 1942
Inactivated on 31 Jul 1945

=== Assignments ===
- 61st Troop Carrier Group, 23 Oct 1942 – 31 Jul 1945

=== Stations ===
- Sedalia Army Air Field, Missouri, 23 Oct 1942
- Lubbock Army Airfield, Texas, 15 Nov 1942
- Pope Field, North Carolina, 26 Feb-30 Apr 1943
- Lourmel Airfield, Algeria, 15 May 1943
- Kairouan Airfield, Tunisia, 21 Jun 1943
- Licata Airfield, Sicily, 3 Sep 1943
- Sciacca Airfield, Sicily, 6 Oct 1943 – 12 Feb 1944
- RAF Barkston Heath (AAF-483), England, 18 Feb 1944
- Abbeville/Drucat Airfield (B-92), France, 13 Mar-19 May 1945
- Waller Field, Trinidad, 29 May-31 Jul 1945

=== Aircraft ===
- C-47 Skytrain, 1942-1945.
