= Buigny =

Buigny may refer to...

- Buigny-lès-Gamaches, a commune in Hauts-de-France in northern France
- Buigny-l'Abbé, a commune in Hauts-de-France in northern France.
- Buigny-Saint-Maclou, a commune in Hauts-de-France in northern France.

== See also ==
- Bligny (disambiguation)
