= 59th Squadron =

59th Squadron may refer to:

- 59th Bombardment Squadron, U.S. Air Force
- 59th Commando Engineer Squadron, British Army Royal Engineers
- 59th Ferrying Squadron, U.S. Army Air Forces
- 59th Test and Evaluation Squadron, U.S. Air Force
- 59th Troop Carrier Squadron, U.S. Air Force
- 59th Weather Reconnaissance Squadron, U.S. Air Force
