= Space Base Delta 3 =

United States Space Force unit

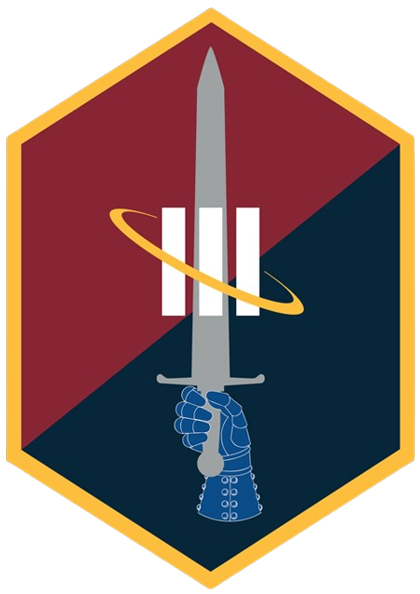
- Delta emblem
- Active: 1940–1945; 1946–1959; 1984–1992; 1994–present
- Country: United States
- Branch: United States Space Force
- Part of: Space Systems Command
- Headquarters: Los Angeles Air Force Base, El Segundo, California, U.S.

Commanders
- Commander: Col Andrew C. Dermanoski
- Deputy Commander: Lt Col John D. Huntsman
- Senior Enlisted Leader: CMSgt Sarah R. L. Morgan
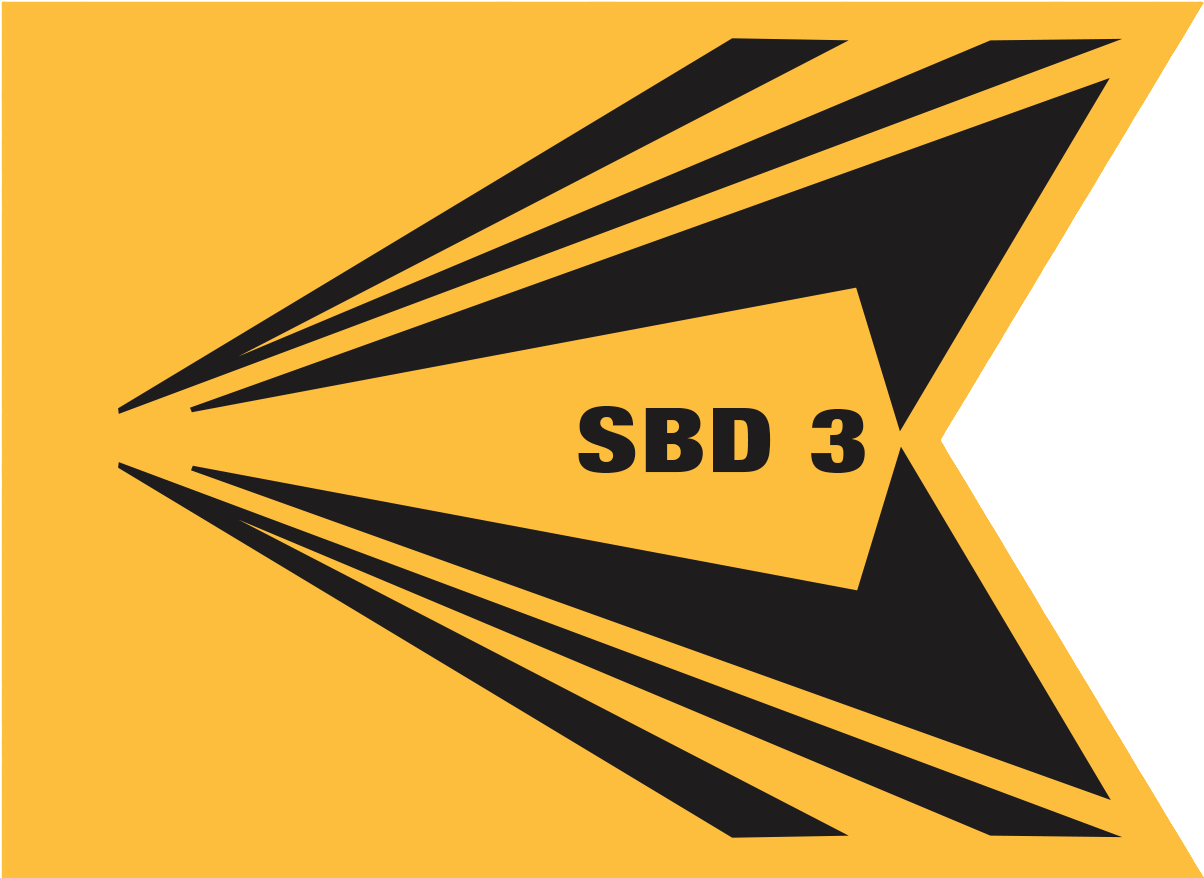
- SPACE BASE DELTA 3 GUIDON

Space Base Delta 3 (SBD 3) is a United States Space Force unit that provides base support for Los Angeles Air Force Base (plus Fort MacArthur) in El Segundo, California, United States, via its components: 61st Medical Squadron, 61st Civil Engineer and Logistics Squadron, 61st Communications Squadron, 61st Force Support Squadron, 61st Security Forces Squadron, and 11 staff agencies.

The garrison is assigned to and supports Space Systems Command. It is the successor to the 61st Air Base Group of the United States Air Force and the Los Angeles Garrison, which existed through the first two years of the Space Force.

The origins date to World War II where the 61st Troop Carrier Group (61 TCG) was a Douglas C-47 Skytrain transport unit assigned to both Twelfth and Ninth Air Forces in North Africa, Italy and Western Europe. The 61 TCG was highly decorated for its combat parachute infantry drops during the Invasion of Sicily (Operation Husky); Invasion of Italy (Operation Avalanche); Invasion of France (Operation Overlord); the airborne invasion of the Netherlands (Operation Market-Garden); and the airborne crossing of the Rhine River (Operation Varsity).

== History ==
For additional history and lineage, see 61st Air Base Wing

The group was established before the Attack on Pearl Harbor, in December 1940, with Douglas C-47 Skytrain transport aircraft. It initially trained under I Troop Carrier Command in the southeast United States. Trained in paratroop missions and glider towing, it was deployed to the Mediterranean Theater of Operations (MTO) and flew combat missions in the North African and Tunisian Campaigns under Twelfth Air Force.

It flew airborne assault and resupply airdrop missions during the invasions of Sicily and Italy in 1943 and transported cargo and personnel throughout the North African and Mediterranean theaters.

Reassigned to Ninth Air Force and was moved to England in the European Theater of Operations (ETO). Flew airborne assault missions during the Normandy invasion and later supported Operation Market Garden in the Netherlands. In 1945 it participated in the airborne assault across the Rhine. Also provided transport services in the European theater, hauling gasoline, ammunition, food, medicine, and other supplies, and evacuating wounded personnel.

Moved to Trinidad in May 1945. Assigned to Air Transport Command. Used C-47's to transport troops returning to the US. Inactivated in Trinidad on 31 July 1945.

=== Cold War ===
It was reactivated in Germany on 30 September 1946. Assigned to United States Air Forces in Europe. Redesignated 61st Troop Carrier Group (Medium) in July 1948, and 61st Troop Carrier Group (Heavy) in August 1948. In Germany, the group participated in the Berlin Airlift, from June 1948 to May 1949, the group's C-54 aircraft ferried coal, flour, and other cargo into Berlin.

In 1950, the group moved to the United States shortly after the outbreak of the Korean War for duty with Military Air Transport Service. Attached to Far East Air Forces, it flew airlift missions on the Northern Pacific Route from the United States to Japan in support of UN forces in Korea before moving to Japan and conducting airlift missions from Japan to Korea from 1950 to 1952.

Returned to the US in November 1952 to join Tactical Air Command, to which the group had been assigned in October 1951. Converted from C-54 to C-124 aircraft and carried out worldwide strategic airlift operations from 1952 to 1959. Inactivated on 8 October 1959.

The 61st Military Airlift Group was reactivated at Howard Air Force Base, Panama on 1 December 1984. At Howard, the group was the parent unit for the 310th Military Airlift Squadron (310th MAS) with a diverse array of aircraft (C-21A, CT-43A, C-130E/H, C-27A). The C-21 and CT-43 provided VIP airlift support for the Commander-In-Chief, U.S. Southern Command (CINCSOUTH). The C-130s and C-27s flew tactical airlift operations in Central and South America from 1984 to 1992. The unit was inactivated and its assets absorbed by the 24th Wing when the 310th's mission was transferred to Air Combat Command on 1 June 1992.

=== Base support ===
The 61st Air Base Group operated Los Angeles Air Force Base and supported the Space and Missile Systems Center (SMC) since 1994.

On 14 July 2022, the Los Angeles Garrison became Space Base Delta 3.

Now-Space Base Delta 3 continues to provide facilities support for the successor to SMC, Space Systems Command.

== Lineage ==
- Established as 61st Transport Group on 20 November 1940

Activated on 1 December 1940
Redesignated 61st Troop Carrier Group on 4 July 1942
Inactivated on 31 July 1945

- Activated on 30 September 1946

Redesignated: 61st Troop Carrier Group, Medium, on 1 July 1948
Redesignated: 61st Troop Carrier Group, Heavy, on 15 August 1948
Inactivated on 8 October 1959

- Redesignated 61st Military Airlift Group, and activated, on 1 December 1984

Inactivated on 1 June 1992

- Redesignated 61st Air Base Group on 16 September 1994

Activated on 1 October 1994

- Redesignated 61st Mission Support Group on 1 August 2006
- Redesignated 61st Air Base Group on 30 July 2010
- Redesignated Los Angeles Garrison on 13 August 2021, and became part of the Space Force that day
- Redesignated Space Base Delta 3 on 14 July 2022

=== Assignments ===
- Unknown, 1 December 1940 – 31 March 1942
- 50th Transport Wing, 31 March 1942
- 51st Transport Wing (later 51st Troop Carrier Wing), 1 June 1942
- 52d Troop Carrier Wing, 6 August 1942
- 50th Troop Carrier Wing, 12 October 1942
- 53d Troop Carrier Wing, 3 November 1942
- 52d Troop Carrier Wing, 15 February 1943
- Air Transport Command, 7 May 1945
- Attached to Caribbean Division, Air Transport Command, 29 May – 31 July 1945
- 51st Troop Carrier Wing (known as European Air Transport Service, Provisional), 30 September 1946
- United States Air Forces in Europe, 20 December 1947
- 61st Troop Carrier Wing, 1 July 1948

Attached to: 1st Airlift Task Force, 5–26 November 1948
Attached to: Airlift Wing [Provisional], 26 November 1948 – 20 January 1949
Attached to: 7497th Airlift Wing, 20 January – 10 July 1949
Attached to: Military Air Transport Service, 21–26 July 1950
Attached to: North Pacific Air Transport Wing, Provisional, 26 July – 24 August 1950
Attached to: 1705th Air Transport Wing, 24 August – 10 December 1950
Attached to: Far East Air Force Combat Cargo Command, Provisional, 10 December 1950 – 1 January 1951

- 1705th Air Transport Wing, 1 January 1951

Attached to: Far East Air Forces Combat Cargo Command, Provisional, 1–25 January 1951
Attached to: 315th Air Division, 25 January – 1 October 1951

- Eighteenth Air Force, 1 October 1951

Attached to: 315th Air Division, 1 October – 5 November 1951
Attached to: 6122 Air Base Wing, 5 November 1951 – 26 March 1952
Attached to: 374th Troop Carrier Wing, 26 March – 21 November 1952
Attached to: 62d Troop Carrier Wing, 21 November 1952 – 25 August 1954
Attached to: 63d Troop Carrier Wing, 25 August 1954 – 1 July 1957

- 63d Troop Carrier Wing, 1 July 1957 – 8 October 1959
- Twenty-First Air Force, 1 December 1984 – 1 June 1992
- Space and Missile Systems Center, 1 October 1994
- 61st Air Base Wing, 1 August 2006
- Space and Missile Systems Center, 30 July 2010 – present

=== Components ===
- 4th Troop Carrier Squadron: attached 10 December 1950 – 24 July 1951
- 12th Troop Carrier Squadron: attached 30 September – 15 October 1946
- 13th Transport (later, 13th Troop Carrier) Squadron: 1 December 1940-c. 10 October 1942
- 14th Transport (later, 14th Troop Carrier) Squadron: 4 December 1940 – 31 July 1945; 30 September 1946 – 8 October 1959 (detached c. 5 December 1950 – 26 March 1952; 21 November – 1 December 1952; August 1956 – March 1957; August-8 October 1959)
- 15th Transport (later, 15th Troop Carrier) Squadron: 4 December 1940 – 31 July 1945; 30 September 1946 – 8 October 1959 (detached February–August 1957)
- 53d Transport (later, 53d Troop Carrier) Squadron: 1 June 1942 – 31 July 1945; 30 September 1946 – 8 October 1959 (detached 26 March – 14 September 1952; September 1958-c. March 1959)
- 59th Troop Carrier Squadron: 23 October 1942 – 31 July 1945
- 310th Military Airlift Squadron: 1 December 1984 – 1 June 1992.

==== Current squadrons ====
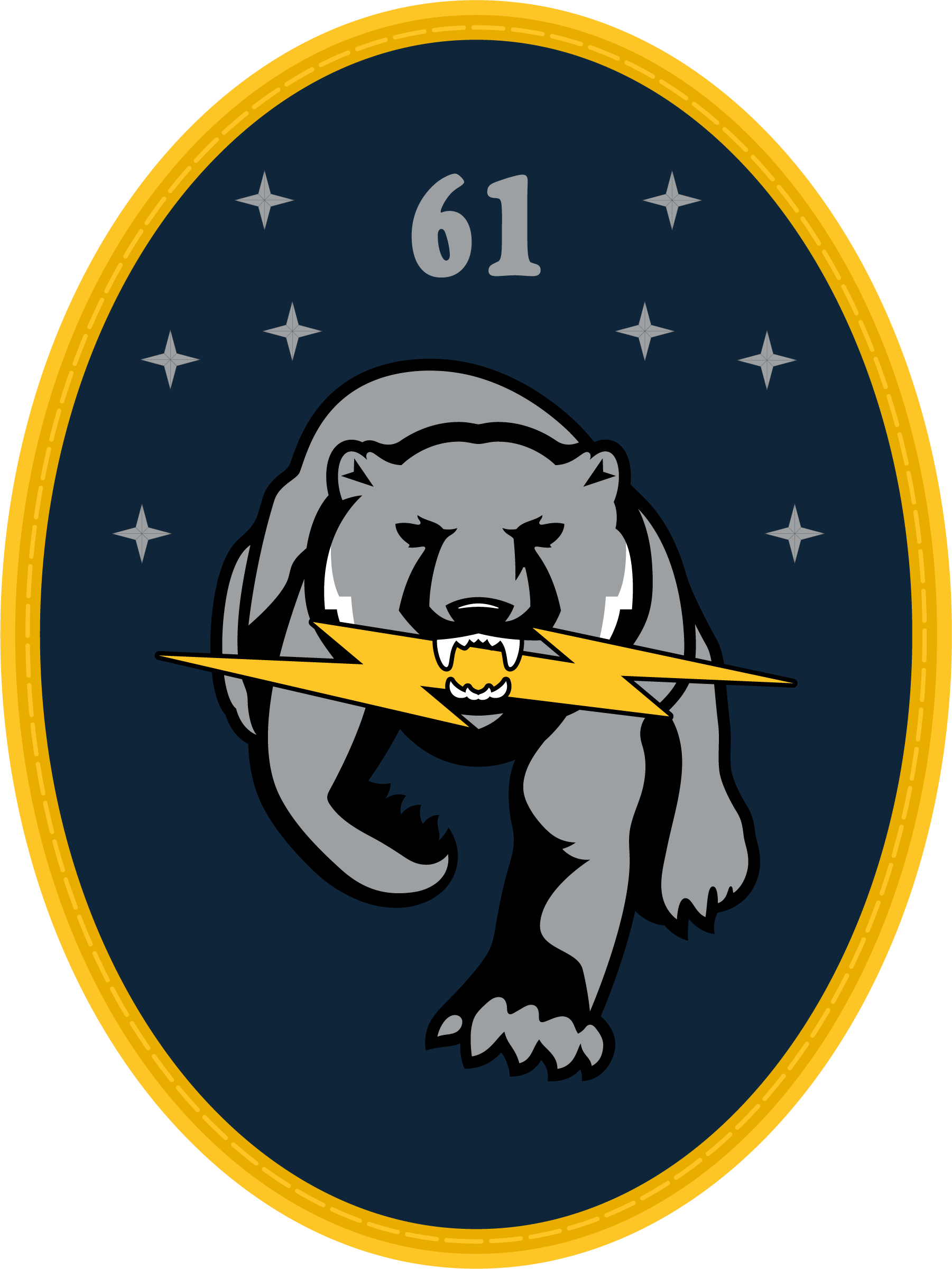
61st Space Communications Squadron

=== Stations ===
- Olmsted Field, Pennsylvania, 1 December 1940
- Daniel Field, Georgia, 9 July 1941
- Pope Field, North Carolina, 26 May 1942
- Lubbock Army Air Field, Texas, 23 September 1942
- Pope Field, North Carolina, 26 February 1943 – 4 May 1943
- Lourmel Airfield, Morocco, 15 May 1943
- Kairouan Airfield, Tunisia, 21 June 1943
- Licata Airfield, Sicily, Italy, 1 September 1943
- Sciacca Airfield, Sicily, Italy, 6 October 1943
- RAF Barkston Heath (AAF-483), England, 18 February 1944
- Abbeville/Drucat Airfield (B-92), France, 13 March – 19 May 1945
- Waller Field, Trinidad, 29 May – 31 July 1945
- Eschborn Airfield, Germany, 30 September 1946
- Rhein-Main Air Base, Germany, 11 February 1947 – 21 July 1950
- McChord Air Force Base, Washington, 26 July – 5 December 1950
- Ashiya Air Base, Japan, 10 December 1950
- Tachikawa Air Base, Japan, 26 March – 15 November 1952
- Larson Air Force Base, Washington, 21 November 1952
- Donaldson Air Force Base, South Carolina, 25 August 1954 – 8 October 1959
- Howard Air Force Base, Panama, 1 December 1984 – 1 June 1992
- Los Angeles Air Force Base, California, 1 October 1994 – present

=== Aircraft ===
- C-47 Skytrain, 1942–1945; 1946–1948
- CG-4 Waco (Glider), 1942–1945
- C-54 Skymaster, 1948–1952
- C-124 Globemaster, 1952–1959
- C-130 Hercules, 1984–1992.
- C-22A (Boeing 727-30), 1985–1990

== List of commanders ==
=== Commanders of the 61st Air Base Group ===
- Col Andrew Jasinski, 1 October 1994 – 8 September 1995
- Col Gilbert A. Engel, 8 September 1995 – 12 September 1997
- Col Dieter V. Barnes, 12 September 1997 – 18 June 1999
- Col David E. Price, 18 June 1999 – 26 September 2000 (later promoted to brigadier general)
- Col Phil W. Parker, 26 September 2000 – 27 September 2002
- Col Brian E. Kistner, 27 September 2002 – 11 May 2004
- Col Carl E. Brazelton, 11 May 2004 – 21 July 2004
- Col Joseph M. Codispoti, 21 July 2004 – 29 June 2006
- Col Nannette Benitez, 29 June 2006 - July 2008

The 61st Air Base Group redesignated 61st Mission Support Group, 20 June 2006

Activated 1 August 2006

- Col Theresa Katein, July 2008 - 1 August 2010

The 61st Air Base Wing inactivated 30 July 2010

61st Mission Support Group redesignated as 61st Air Base Group

- Col Frank W. Simcox, 1 August 2010 - 29 June 2012
- Col Sam McNiel, 29 June 2012
- Col Donna Turner
- Col Charles P. Roberts, 30 June 2016 – 11 July 2018
- Col Ann M. Igl, 11 July 2018 – 15 July 2020
- Col Becky M. Beers, 15 July 2020 – 14 July 2022

=== Commanders of the 61st Air Base Wing ===
61st Air Base Group redesignated 61st Air Base Wing, 20 Jun 2006

Activated, 1 Aug 2006

- Col Joseph H. Schwarz, 1 Aug 2006 - 22 July 2008
- Col Anita E. Latin, 22 Jul 2008

=== Commanders of Space Base Delta 3 ===
No.	Commander		Term			Ref
No.	Portrait	Name	Took office	Left office	Duration	Ref
1	Mia L. Walsh	Colonel; Mia L. Walsh	14 July 2022	29 May 2024	1 year, 320 days	
2	Andrew C. Dermanoski	Colonel; Andrew C. Dermanoski	29 May 2024	Incumbent	2 years, 62 days	
