= 314th Air Refueling Squadron =

US Air Force unit

314th Air Refueling Squadron

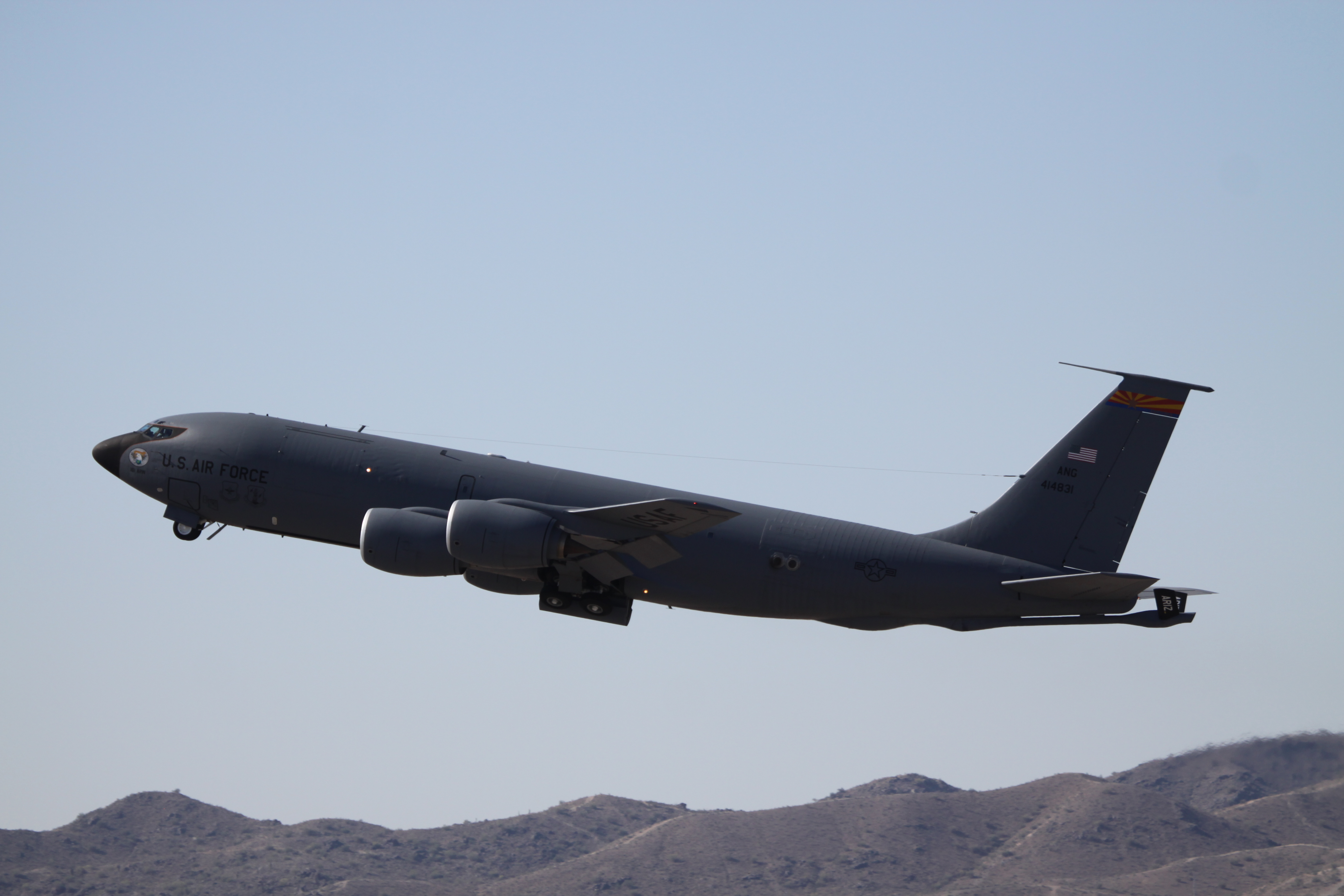
- KC-135R as flown by the squadron
- Active: 1943–1946 1949–1951 1952–2009; 2016–present
- Country: United States
- Branch: United States Air Force
- Role: Aerial refueling
- Part of: Air Force Reserve Command
- Garrison/HQ: Beale Air Force Base
- Mottos: Strength and Persistence
- Mascot: Pegasus Burro ("PegBur")
- Engagements: European Theater of Operations; Operation Noble Anvil; Desert Storm
- Decorations: Air Force Outstanding Unit Award; Republic of Vietnam Gallantry Cross with Palm

Insignia
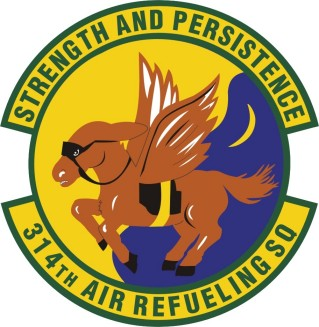
- 314th Air Refueling Squadron emblem (approved 28 September 1961)

The 314th Air Refueling Squadron is an active United States Air Force unit within the Air Force Reserve Command. It is currently assigned to the 940th Air Refueling Wing, based at Beale Air Force Base, California. It was inactivated on 1 July 2009 and reactivated on 1 June 2016.

== Mission ==
It operates the Boeing KC-135 Stratotanker aircraft conducting aerial refueling missions.

== History ==
=== World War II ===
Activated in late 1943 as a Douglas C-47 Skytrain troop carrier squadron, trained under I Troop Carrier Command in the United States. Was not deployed until the spring of 1945 to England, being assigned to the IX Troop Carrier Command. Was not used in combat operations, however did transport supplies and equipment to the front-line ground forces primarily into Germany and evacuated casualties to rear areas. Returned to the United States in September 1945 and was a transport squadron for Continental Air Forces until its inactivation in September 1946.

=== Reserve troop carrier operations ===
It trained in the reserve for troop carrier missions from, 1949–1951, for fighter-bomber missions from, 1952–1957, and resumed its current role as an airlift squadron in 1957 until 1976.

=== Reserve air refueling operations ===
The squadron has performed air refueling missions worldwide since 1977 and maintained an alert responsibility for Strategic Air Command until the command's inactivation in June 1992. It deployed aircraft and personnel to Saudi Arabia and European locations in support of the Gulf War and later contingency operations in Somalia and the Balkans.

The squadron was inactivated in 2009 pursuant to 2005 Base Realignment and Closure Commission action that eliminated the 940th Air Refueling Wing's KC-135 flying mission and redesignated it as the 940th Wing as an associate unit to the 9th Reconnaissance Wing in support of RQ-4 Global Hawk remotely piloted (e.g., uncrewed) aircraft operations. In 2016, the wing returned to its former designation as an air refueling wing and reacquired its crewed flying mission and KC-135R aircraft, with the reactivation of the squadron occurring the same year.

== Lineage ==
- Constituted as the 314th Troop Carrier Squadron on 23 October 1943

Activated on 1 November 1943
Inactivated on 31 July 1946

- Redesignated '314th Troop Carrier Squadron'[, Medium on 10 May 1949

Activated in the reserve on 27 June 1949
Ordered to active service on 1 April 1951
Inactivated on 2 April 1951

- Redesignated 314th Fighter-Bomber Squadron on 26 May 1952

Activated in the reserve on 13 June 1952
Redesignated 314th Troop Carrier Squadron, Medium on 1 September 1957
Ordered to active service on 28 October 1962
Released from active service on 28 November 1962
Redesignated 314th Troop Carrier Squadron, Heavy on 1 April 1965
Redesignated 314th Air Transport Squadron, Heavy on 1 December 1965
Redesignated 314th Military Airlift Squadron on 1 January 1966
Redesignated 314th Tactical Airlift Squadron on 1 April 1972
Redesignated 314th Air Refueling Squadron, Heavy on 1 January 1977
Redesignated 314th Air Refueling Squadron on 1 February 1992
Inactivated on 1 July 2009

- Activated 29 April 2016

=== Assignments ===
- 349th Troop Carrier Group, 1 November 1943 – 31 July 1946
- 349th Troop Carrier Group, 27 June 1949 – 2 April 1951
- 349th Fighter-Bomber Group (later 349th Troop Carrier Group), 13 June 1952
- 349th Troop Carrier Wing, 14 April 1959
- 940th Troop Carrier Group (later 940th Air Transport Group, 940th Military Airlift Group, 940th Tactical Airlift Group, 940th Air Refueling Group), 11 February 1963
- 940th Operations Group, 1 August 1992 – 1 July 2009
- 940th Operations Group, 29 April 2016 – present

=== Stations ===
- Sedalia Army Air Field, Missouri, 1 November 1943
- Alliance Army Air Field, Nebraska, 20 January 1944
- Pope Field, North Carolina, 11 March 1944
- Baer Field, Indiana, 7–15 March 1945
- RAF Barkston Heath (AAF-483), England, 30 March 1945
- Roye-Amy Airfield (A-73), France, 18 April – 13 July 1945
- Bergstrom Field, Texas, 17 September 1945 – 7 September 1946
- Hamilton Air Force Base, California, 27 June 1949 – 2 Apr 1951
- Hamilton Air Force Base, California, 13 June 1952
- Hill Air Force Base, Utah, 14 October 1955
- Mather Air Force Base, California, 1 January 1977
- McClellan Air Force Base, California, 1 July 1993
- Beale Air Force Base, California, 1 October 1997 – 1 July 2009, 19 April 2016 - present

=== Aircraft ===
- Douglas C-53 Skytrooper (1943–1944)
- Douglas C-47 Skytrain (1943–1944, 1945–1946)
- Curtiss C-46 Commando (1944–1946, 1949–1951, 1952–1958)
- Waco CG-4 (1944 – c. 1946)
- Consolidated C-109 Liberator Express (1945)
- North American T-6 Texan (1949–1950, 1952–1954)
- Beechcraft T-7 Navigator (1949–1951)
- Beechcraft T-11 Kansan (1949–1951)
- North American T-28 Trojan (1953–1956)
- Fairchild C-119 Flying Boxcar (1958–1965)
- Douglas C-124 Globemaster II (1965–1972)
- Lockheed C-130 Hercules (1972–1975)
- Boeing KC-135 Stratotanker (1976–2009, 2016–present)
