= 63rd Air Expeditionary Wing =

63d Air Expeditionary Wing

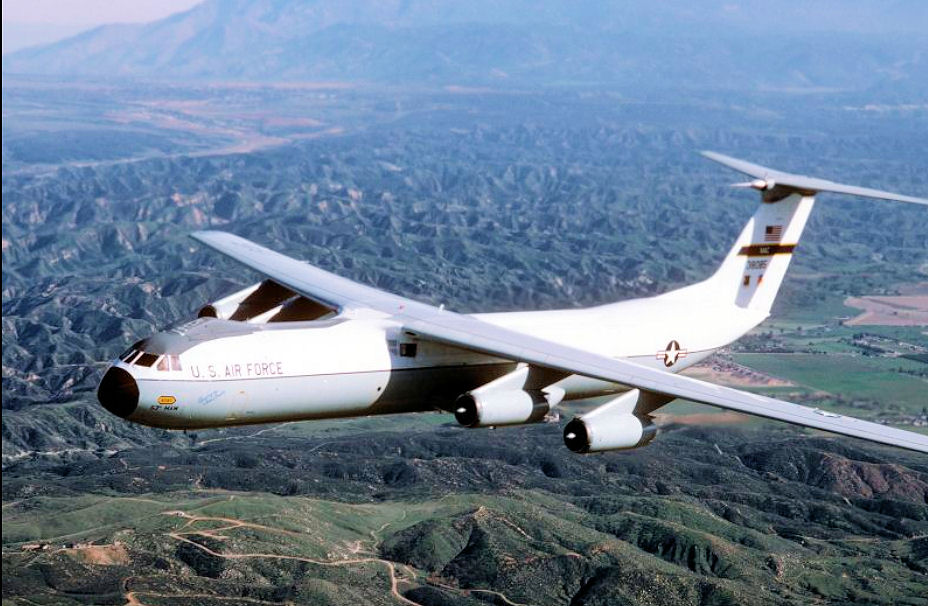
- 63d Wing C-141 Starlifter (Note: Aircraft is Lockheed C-141B-10-LM Starlifter serial 63-8085, named Spirit of the Inland Empire. Built as a C-141A, shown after being updated to C-141B configuration about 1980/81. Updated to C-141C in 2000. Retired to AMARC as CR0190 14 October 2003.)
- Active: 1949–1951; 1953–1994
- Country: United States
- Branch: United States Air Force
- Role: Command of air expeditionary units
- Part of: Air Mobility Command
- Mottos: Omnia, Ubique, Semper (Latin for 'Anything, Anywhere, Anytime')
- Decorations: Air Force Outstanding Unit Award

Insignia
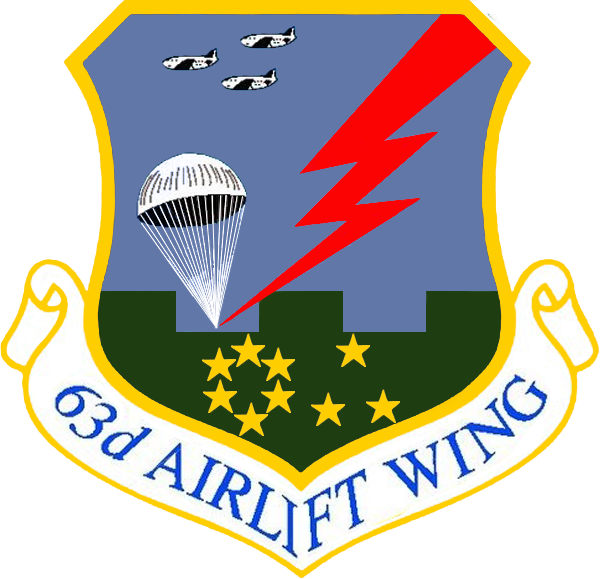
- 63d Air Expeditionary Wing emblem (Note: Approved 2 October 1953.)

The 63d Air Expeditionary Wing is a provisional unit of the United States Air Force. It is assigned to Air Mobility Command to activate or inactivate as needed. No publicly available information indicates it has been active as an expeditionary unit. The wing was last active as the 63d Airlift Wing at Norton Air Force Base, California, where it was inactivated on 1 April 1994.

The wing was first activated as the 63d Troop Carrier Wing in the Air Force Reserve in June 1949, when Continental Air Command reorganized its units under the wing base organizational model. It was ordered into active duty for the Korean War in May 1951 and, after its personnel were used as fillers for other units, inactivated a week later.

The wing was activated as a heavy troop carrier unit in 1953 under Tactical Air Command. In 1957, heavy troop carrier units in the United States, including the wing, were transferred to Military Air Transport Service. The unit continued to fly the Douglas C-124 Globemaster II until 1967, when it moved to Norton Air Force Base and began to operate the Lockheed C-141 Starlifter. The wing served as a strategic airlift unit until it was inactivated in 1994.

== History ==
Related history at 63d Operations Group

Media related to 63d Air Expeditionary Wing (United States Air Force) at Wikimedia Commons

=== Air Force Reserve ===
The wing was first activated in June 1949 as the 63d Troop Carrier Wing, when Continental Air Command reorganized its flying units under the wing base organization system. The formation of the wing also responded to the reduction in Air Force units required by President Truman’s 1949 defense budget. Although the wing was a new unit, the 91st Air Division and 66th Reconnaissance Group at Newark Municipal Airport and the 320th Bombardment Group at Mitchel Air Force Base, all reserve units in the New York City area, were simultaneously inactivated. The new wing was manned at only 25% of normal strength but its 63d Troop Carrier Group was authorized four squadrons rather than the three of active duty units.

It trained in the Air Force Reserve until 1951, initially with trainer aircraft. From the middle of 1950 until it was ordered into active service, the wing performed limited troop carrier operations with Douglas C-47 Skytrains. In May 1951 the wing was ordered into active service, as were all reserve combat wings. Its personnel were used as fillers and its aircraft distributed to other units. The unit was inactivated only a few days after its mobilization.

=== Troop carrier operations ===
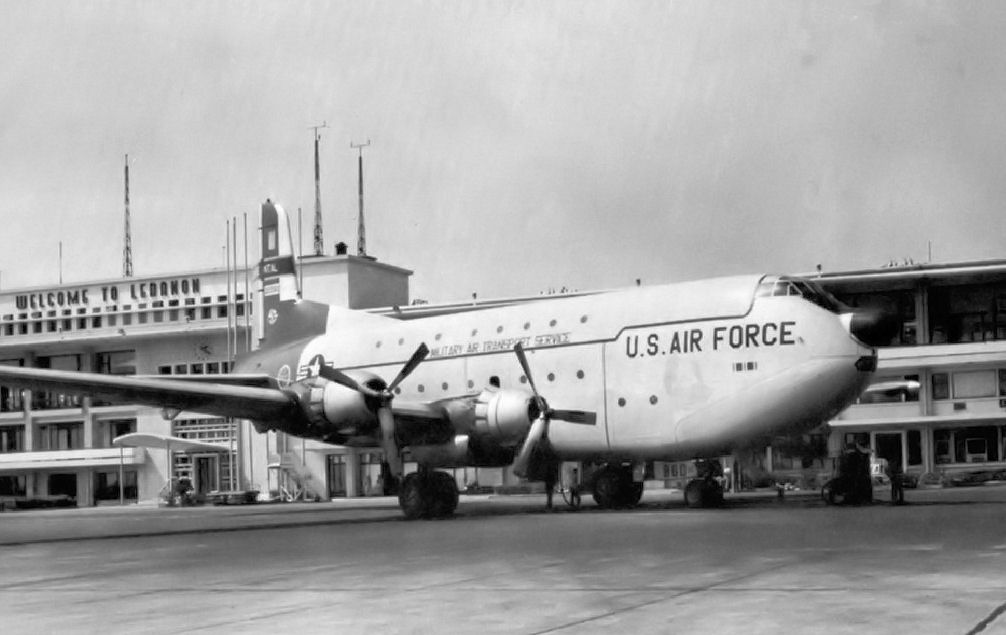
Wing C124 in Lebanon during the 1958 crisis

The wing was activated again as a component of Tactical Air Command (TAC) in 1953. Its tactical components underwent Douglas C-124 Globemaster II training from June through October 1953. When the wing began global airlift missions, including humanitarian missions, using its C-124s as primary carriers.

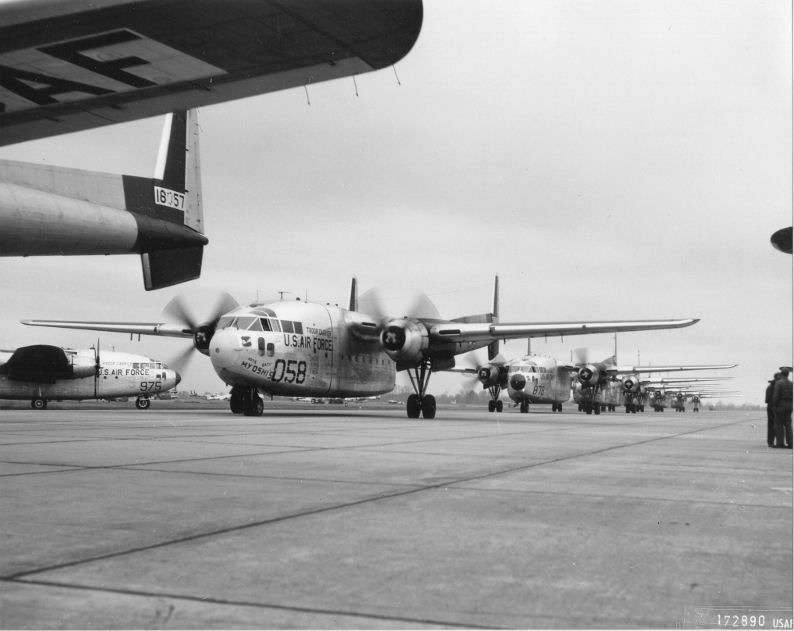
465th Troop Carrier Group C-119 Flying Boxcars

In October 1953, the 465th Troop Carrier Group, which was training at Donaldson with Fairchild C-119 Flying Boxcars and preparing to move to France, was attached to the wing. The 465th Group's parent wing was located in New York without operational aircraft. In November 1953, the group moved to Toul-Rosières Air Base and was reassigned. Another C-119 unit at Donaldson, the 64th Troop Carrier Wing was also attached to the 63d Wing in October. The 64th Wing was phasing out in preparation for inactivation, and its flying mission was transferred entirely to its 64th Troop Carrier Group, which was also attached to the 63d Wing. In February 1954, the plan to inactivate the 64th was changed and it was instead to transfer overseas. The 64th Group was reassigned to the 64th Wing, whose attachment ended in March, also ending the 63d Wing's operation of C-119.

In October 1954, the 309th Troop Carrier Squadron was activated at Donaldson. Although the squadron was assigned to Eighteenth Air Force, it was attached to the wing for operational control. The 309th operated Sikorsky H-19 and Piasecki H-21 Workhorse helicopters as an assault troop carrier squadron. In July 1956, the 309th inactivated and transferred its mission, personnel and H-21s to the 21st Helicopter Squadron, which was activated in its place. The 21st was also attached to the wing until July 1957, when the wing was transferred to Military Air Transport Service (MATS).

In August 1954, TAC increased its C-124 operations on the east coast, moving the 61st Troop Carrier Group from Larson Air Force Base, Washington to Donaldson and attaching it to the wing. When TAC transferred its heavy troop carrier units to MATS, MATS assigned the 61st Group to the wing until the group was inactivated on 8 October 1959.

Notable operations for the wing included airlifts and airdrops in the North American Arctic during construction and subsequent operation of the Distant Early Warning Line between 1954 and 1956. In the same region it supported scientific stations on floating ice islands in the Arctic Ocean from 1957 until 1966. On the other end of the world, it flew airlift and airdrop missions supporting the United States Navy's Operation Deep Freeze in Antarctica from 1956 until 1966. The wing maintained a complete tactical squadron on rotation to Europe between August 1956 and January 1967.

=== Strategic airlift ===
Recognizing that its missions focused on strategic airlift, the wing dropped the "troop carrier" designation and became the 63d Military Airlift Wing in January 1966.

Plans to move the wing to Norton Air Force Base, California and equip it with Lockheed C-141 Starlifters were set in motion on 1 July 1966, when Military Airlift Command organized the Military Airlift Wing, Provisional, 63d. For the next nine months, the provisional wing expanded as a full C-141 wing. On 1 April 1967, the wing moved to Norton without personnel or equipment and assumed the mission, personnel and Starlifters of the provisional unit, which was discontinued.

The wing flew airlift missions to the Far East and Southeast Asia during the Vietnam War between 1967 and 1973.

By 1968 regular air force military airlift squadrons were operating the Lockheed C-141 Starlifter, while the reserves still flew the obsolete C-124. As the Globemaster was retired, the Air Force Reserve formed associate units with the C-141. In this program reserve units flew and maintained aircraft owned by an associated regular unit. In March 1968, the 944th Military Airlift Group moved to Norton from March Air Force Base without personnel or equipment and was attached to the wing, flying the regular unit's Starlifters. In July 1973, the associate program was expanded and the 445th Military Airlift Wing replaced the 944th as the reserve associate unit at Norton. The 445th remained an associate of the 63d until 1993, when it was assigned its own aircraft.

These missions included the evacuation of former American prisoners of war from North Vietnam during Operation Homecoming in early 1973. It also supported the airlift of Vietnamese refugees to the United States in Operation New Life during 1975. From 1976 until it inactivated in 1994, the wing commanded airlift and supporting units to airlift troops, cargo, equipment, passengers, mail and aeromedical evacuation/airlift to and from areas around the world.

== Lineage ==
- Established as the 63d Troop Carrier Wing, Medium, on 10 May 1949

Activated in the reserve on 27 June 1949
Ordered to active service on 1 May 1951
Inactivated on 9 May 1951

- Redesignated 63d Troop Carrier Wing, Heavy on 18 December 1952

Activated on 8 January 1953

- Redesignated 63d Military Airlift Wing on 8 January 1966
- Redesignated 63d Airlift Wing on 1 January 1992

Inactivated on 1 April 1994

- Redesignated 63d Air Expeditionary Wing and converted to provisional status on 12 June 2002

=== Assignments ===
- First Air Force, 27 June 1949 – 9 May 1951
- Eighteenth Air Force, 8 January 1953
- Continental Division, Military Air Transport Service (later Western Transport Air Force), 1 July 1957
- Eastern Transport Air Force (later Twenty-First Air Force) 1 October 1958
- Twenty-Second Air Force, 1 April 1967
- Fifteenth Air Force, 1 July 1993 – 1 April 1994
- Air Mobility Command to activate or inactivate at any time on or after 12 June 2002

=== Stations ===
- Floyd Bennett Naval Air Station, New York, 27 June 1949 – 9 May 1951
- Altus Municipal Airport (later Altus Air Force Base), OK, 8 January 1953
- Donaldson Air Force Base, South Carolina, 15 October 1953
- Hunter Air Force Base, Georgia, 1 April 1963
- Norton Air Force Base, California, 1 April 1967 – 1 April 1994

=== Components ===
Wings

- 64th Troop Carrier Wing: attached 15 October 1953 – 1 March 1954
- 445th Military Airlift Wing: attached 1 July 1973 – 1 July 1993

Groups

- 61st Troop Carrier Group: attached 25 August 1954 – 30 June 1957, assigned 1 July 1957 – 8 October 1959 (attached to Airlift Task Force, Provisional 23 July – c. 15 Sep 1958 )
- 63d Troop Carrier Group (later 63d Military Airlift Group, 63d Operations Group): 27 June 1949 – 9 May 1951, 20 June 1953 – 18 January 1963, 15 September 1978 – 1 July 1980, 1 January 1992 – c. 1 April 1994 (Note: Robertson omits the 1992–1994 assignment.)
- 64th Troop Carrier Group: attached 15 October 1953 – 15 February 1954
- 465th Troop Carrier Group: attached 15 October – 30 November 1953
- 944th Military Airlift Group: attached 25 March 1968 – 1 July 1973

Squadrons

- 7th Air Transport Squadron: 1 July 1964 – 8 January 1966
- 14th Troop Carrier Squadron (later 14th Military Airlift Squadron): 18 January 1963 – 1 October 1978, 1 July 1980 – 1 January 1992
- 15th Troop Carrier Squadron (later 15 Military Airlift Squadron): 18 January 1963 – 1 October 1978 (not operational c. February – 14 August 1967); 1 July 1980 – 1 January 1992
- 21st Helicopter Squadron: attached 9 July 1956 – 30 June 1957
- 52d Troop Carrier Squadron (later 52d Military Airlift Squadron): 18 January 1963 – 8 January 1967 (attached to 322d Air Division 18 January 1963 – 8 January 1967); 1 June 1988 – 1 January 1992
- 53d Troop Carrier Squadron (later 53 Military Airlift Squadron): 18 January 1963 – 8 July 1966, 8 January 1972 – 1 October 1978, 1 July 1980 – 1 January 1992
- 54th Troop Carrier Squadron: 1 July 1957 – 8 October 1959 (attached to 63d Troop Carrier Group after 1 July 1957), 18 January 1963 – 25 January 1965
- 58th Military Airlift Squadron: 8 January – 1 July 1966
- 309th Troop Carrier Squadron: attached 8 October 1954 – 9 July 1956

=== Aircraft ===
- North American T-6 Texan, 1949–1950
- Beechcraft T-7 Navigator, 1949–1951
- Beechcraft T-11 Kansan, 1949–1951
- Douglas C-47 Skytrain, 1949–1951
- Fairchild C-119 Flying Boxcar, 1953–1954
- Douglas C-124 Globemaster II, 1953–1967
- Sikorsky H-19, 1954–1956
- Piasecki H-21 Workhorse, 1956–1957
- Lockheed C-141 Starlifter, 1967–1993

=== Awards ===
Award streamer	Award	Dates	Notes
	Air Force Outstanding Unit Award	2 March 1955 – 31 May 1955	63d Troop Carrier Wing
	Air Force Outstanding Unit Award	1 July 1957 – 10 December 1962	63d Troop Carrier Wing
	Air Force Outstanding Unit Award	1 July 1968 – 30 June 1969	63d Military Airlift Wing
	Air Force Outstanding Unit Award	1 July 1970 – 30 June 1971	63d Military Airlift Wing
	Air Force Outstanding Unit Award	1 June 1978 – 31 May 1980	63d Military Airlift Wing
	Air Force Outstanding Unit Award	1 January 1983 – 31 December 1983	63d Military Airlift Wing
	Air Force Outstanding Unit Award	1 January 1987 – 31 December 1987	63d Military Airlift Wing
	Air Force Outstanding Unit Award	1 January 1990 – 30 April 1991	63d Military Airlift Wing
