= Bligny =

Bligny is the name or part of the name of the following communes in France:

- Bligny, Aube, in the Aube department
- Bligny, Marne, in the Marne department
- Bligny-le-Sec, in the Côte-d'Or department
- Bligny-lès-Beaune, in the Côte-d'Or department
- Bligny-sur-Ouche, in the Côte-d'Or department
