= Buigny-Saint-Maclou =

- Commune
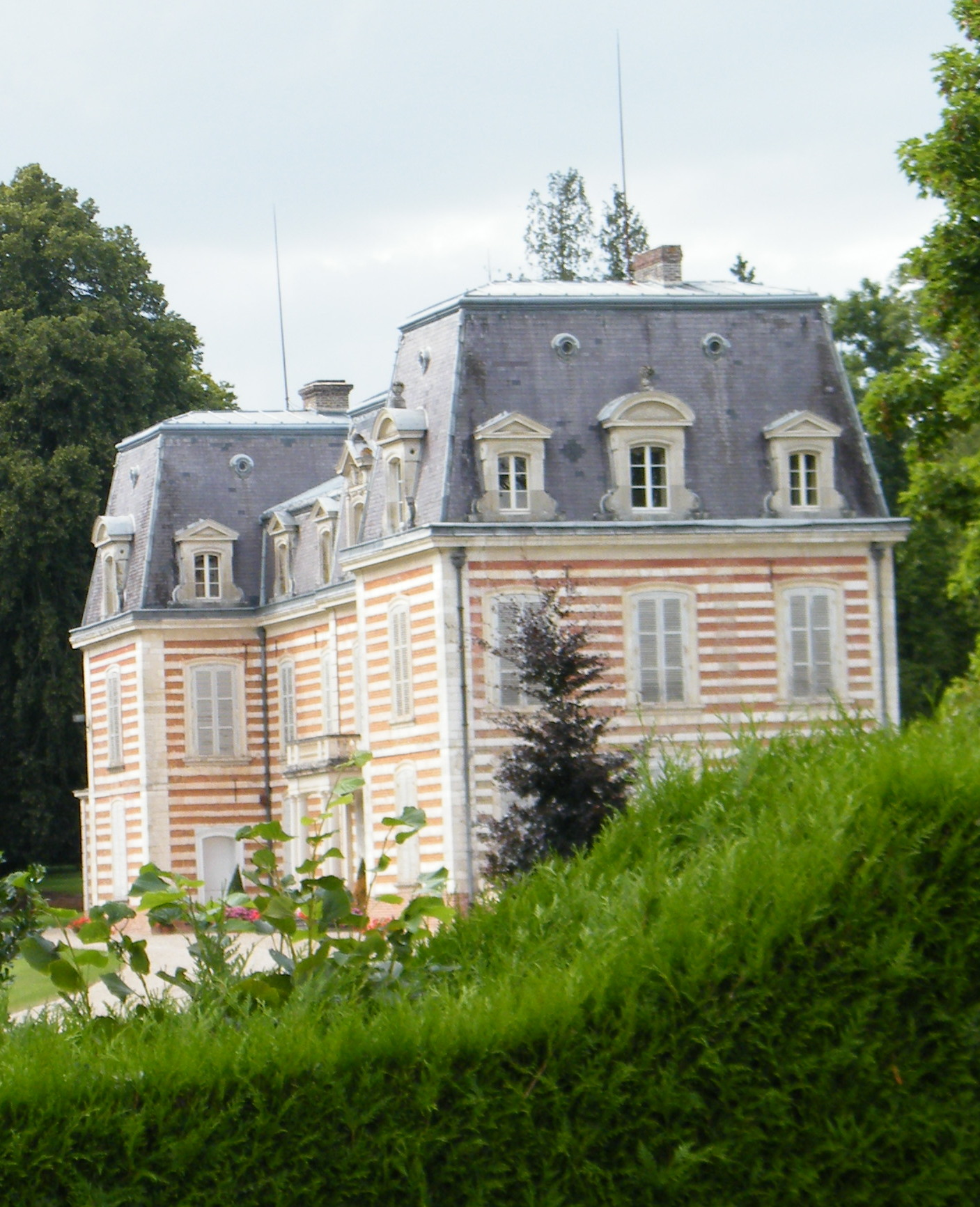
- The chateau in Buigny-Saint-Maclou

- Coat of arms
- Location of Buigny-Saint-Maclou
- Location within France Location within Hauts-de-France
- Coordinates: 50°09′21″N 1°48′51″E
- Country: France
- Region: Hauts-de-France
- Department: Somme
- Arrondissement: Abbeville
- Canton: Abbeville-1
- Intercommunality: CC Ponthieu-Marquenterre

Government
  - Mayor (2020–2026): Eric Mouton
- Area^{1}: 7.3 km^{2} (2.8 sq mi)
- Elevation: 40 m (130 ft)
- Highest elevation: 71 m (233 ft)
- Lowest elevation: 33 m (108 ft)
- Population (2023): 514
  - Density: 70/km^{2} (180/sq mi)
- Time zone: UTC+01:00 (CET)
  - Summer (DST): UTC+02:00 (CEST)
- INSEE/Postal code: 80149 /80132
- ^{1} French Land Register data, which excludes lakes, ponds, glaciers > 1 km^{2} (0.386 sq mi or 247 acres) and river estuaries.

Buigny-Saint-Maclou (French pronunciation: [bɥiɲi sɛ̃ maklu]; Picard: Bugny-Saint-Maclou) is a commune in the Somme department in Hauts-de-France in northern France.

== Geography ==
The commune is situated on the N1 road, just 4 miles (6 km) north of Abbeville. The Abbeville airport is within the boundaries of the commune.

== Population ==
Historical population
Year	Pop.	±% p.a.
1968	335	—
1975	292	−1.94%
1982	467	+6.94%
1990	548	+2.02%
1999	523	−0.52%
2007	519	−0.10%
2012	514	−0.19%
2017	517	+0.12%
2023	514	−0.10%
Source: INSEE

== See also ==
- Communes of the Somme department
