= 63rd Operations Group =

United States Air Force unit

63d Troop Carrier Group
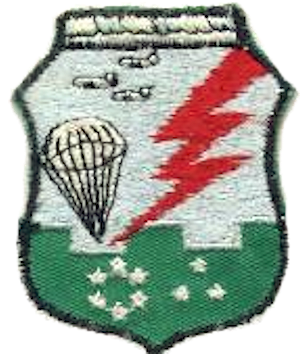
- Emblem of the 63d Troop Carrier Group
- Active: 1940–1963
- Country: United States
- Branch: United States Air Force
- Type: Airlift

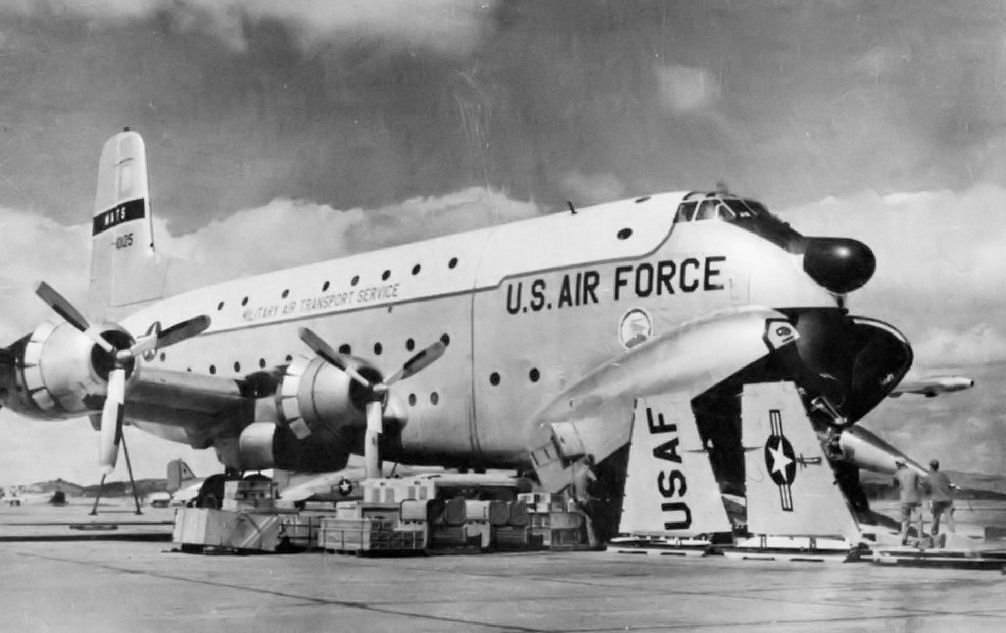
63d TCG C-124 at Hamilton AFB, California being prepared to load a Lockheed F-104 Starfighter being transported to Formosa, 1958

The 63d Troop Carrier Group is an inactive United States Air Force unit. Its last was assigned to the 63d Troop Carrier Wing, Eastern Transport Air Force (MATS), stationed at Hunter Air Force Base, Georgia. It was inactivated on 18 January 1963.

== History ==
For additional history and lineage, see 63d Airlift Wing

Activated in 1940 as a training organization for transport crews. During World War II continued training mission for troop carrier aircraft, being associated with I Troop Carrier Command. Inactivated in April 1944.

On 10 May 1949 the group was reconstituted as an Air Force Reserve group as part of Tactical Air Command It was equipped with C-54 Skymasters and assigned to Floyd Bennett Field, New York. It was activated to Federal Service on 1 May 1951, and its personnel and equipment were sent to Japan to be used in the Korean War with the 61st Troop Carrier Group. With its personnel and equipment deployed, the group was inactivated on 9 May 1951.

Reactivated in 1953 under Eighteenth Air Force, Tactical Air Command flying C-119 Flying Boxcars. Transported personnel and supplies, and participated in exercises and maneuvers with Army airborne troops. Upgraded to C-124 Globemaster II heavy strategic transports in 1954 and participated in maneuvers, exercises and the airlift of personnel and cargo to many points throughout the world.

Parent 63d Troop Carrier Wing became part of Military Air Transport Service on 1 July 1957 however retained troop carrier identity and were remained dedicated to support TAC on troop deployments. Under MATS, performed global airlift missions, including occasional humanitarian or mercy missions, using C-124s as its primary aircraft in the 1958 Lebanon crisis; the 1958 Taiwan Strait Crisis when group assisted intercontinental transport of a complete operational Air Force squadron being airlifted in a single-package operation; the Congo Crisis of 1962 and to Southeast Asia where C-124s transported Thai and United States Marines to locations near the Mekong River in Thailand to deter communist aggression in 1962.

Inactivated in 1963 when parent wing moved to Hunter AFB and squadrons were assigned directly to the wing under the Tri-Deputate organization.

== Lineage ==
- Constituted as the 63d Transport Group on 20 November 1940

Activated on 1 December 1940
Redesignated 63d Troop Carrier Group in Jul 1942
Disbanded on 14 April 1944

- Reconstituted and redesignated 63d Troop Carrier Group, Medium on 10 May 1949

Activated in the reserve on 27 June 1949
Activated to Federal Service on 1 May 1951
Inactivated on 9 May 1951

- Redesignated 63d Troop Carrier Group, Heavy on 1 June 1953

Activated on 20 June 1953
Inactivated on 18 January 1963

- Redesignated 63d Military Airlift Group

Activated on 15 September 1978
Inactivated on 1 July 1980

- Redesignated 63d Operations Group

Activated on 1 January 1992
Inactivated 1 October 1993

- Redesignated 63d Expeditionary Operations Group and converted to provisional statuson 12 June 2002

=== Assignments ===
- Air Service Command (ASC), 1 December 1940 – April 1942
- 53rd Troop Carrier Wing, April 1942 – July 1943
- Army Air Forces Training Command, July 1943 – 14 April 1944
- First Air Force, 27 June 1949 – 9 May 1951
- 63d Troop Carrier Wing, 20 June 1953 – 18 January 1963
- 63d Military Airlift Wing, 15 September 1978 – 1 July 1980
- 63d Airlift Wing, 1 January 1992 – c. 1 April 1994
- Air Mobility Command to activate or inactivate as needed, 12 June 2002

=== Components ===
- 3rd Transport (later Troop Carrier) Squadron: 1 December 1940 – 14 April 1944; 27 June 1949 – 9 May 1951; 20 June 1953 – 18 January 1963
- 6th Transport (later Troop Carrier) Squadron: 1 December 1940 – 12 November 1942
- 9th Transport (later Troop Carrier) Squadron: 1 December 1940 – 3 February 1944; 27 June 1949 – 9 May 1951; 20 June 1953 – 18 January 1963
- 52nd Troop Carrier Squadron: 15 June 1942 – 14 April 1944; 27 June 1949 – 9 May 1951; 20 June 1953 – 18 January 1963
- 60th Troop Carrier Squadron: 26 October 1942 – 14 April 1944; 27 June 1949 – 9 May 1951

=== Stations ===
- Wright Field, Ohio, 1 December 1940
- Patterson Field, Ohio, 17 February 1941
- Brookley Field, Alabama, 9 September 1941
- Camp Williams, Wisconsin, 3 May 1942
- Dodd Field, Texas, c. 18 September 1942
- Victorville Army Air Field, California, c. 18 November 1942
- Lawson Field, Georgia, 7 May 1943
- Grenada Army Air Field, Mississippi, c. 3 June 1943
- Sedalia Army Air Field, Missouri, 19 January – 14 April 1944.
- Floyd Bennett Field, New York, 27 June 1949 – 9 May 1951
- Altus Air Force Base, Oklahoma, 20 June 1953
- Donaldson Air Force Base, South Carolina, 15 October 1953 – 18 January 1963
- Norton Air Force Base, California, 15 September 1978 – 1 July 1980
- Norton Air Force Base, California, 1 January 1992 – c. 1 April 1994

=== Aircraft ===
- Used C-33, C-34, and C-50 aircraft; later equipped with C-47's and C-53's for training, 1940–1944
- C-54 Skymaster, 1949–1951
- C-119 Flying Boxcar, 1953–1954
- C-124 Globemaster II, 1954–1963
