= RAF Barkston Heath =

Royal Air Force station in Lincolnshire, England

RAF Barkston Heath
- Near Grantham, Lincolnshire in England
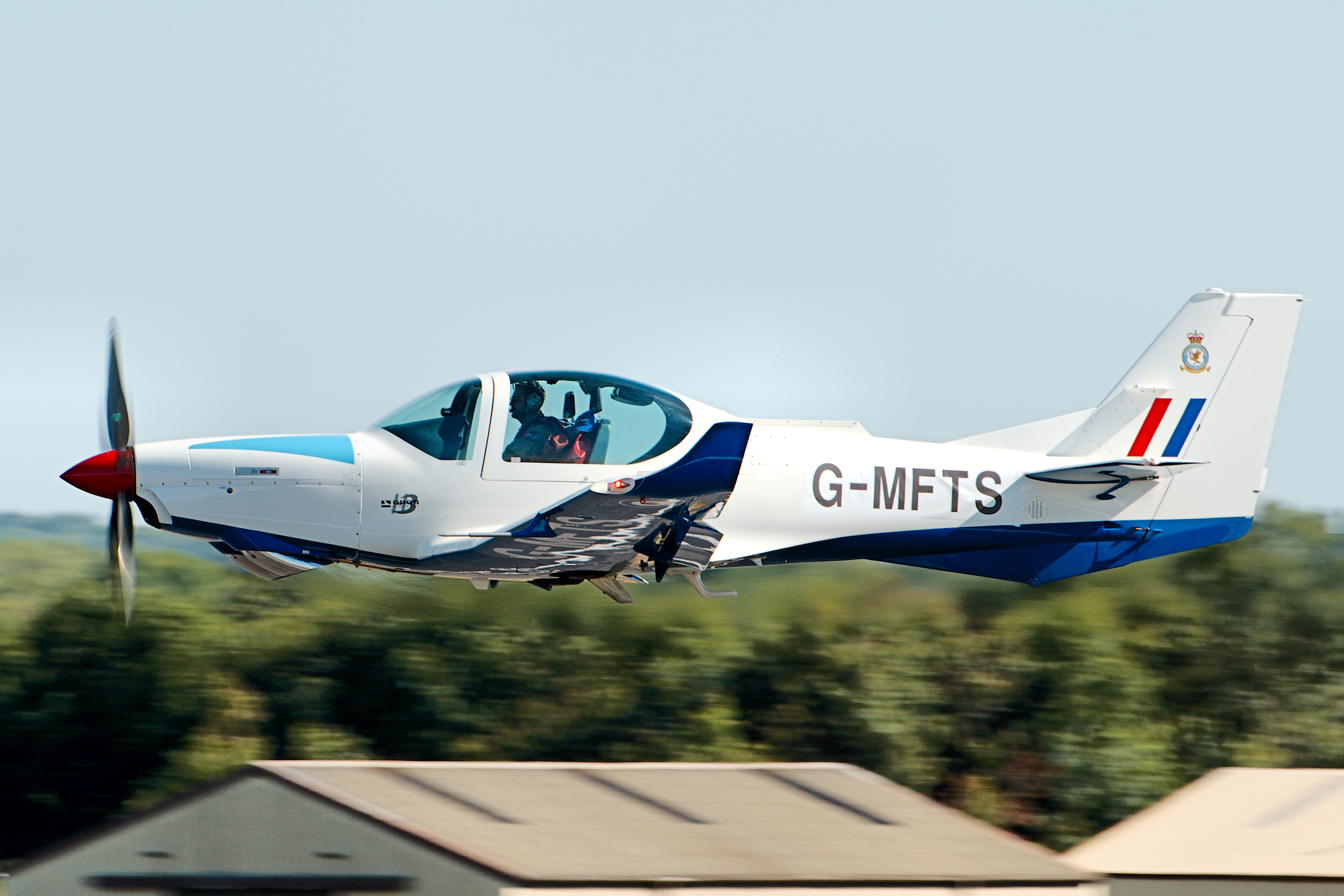
- A Grob Prefect T1 based at Barkston Heath

Site information
- Type: Relief Landing Ground
- Owner: Ministry of Defence
- Operator: Royal Air Force
- Controlled by: No. 22 Group (Training)
- Condition: Operational

Location
- Shown within Lincolnshire
- Coordinates: 52°57′44″N 000°33′42″W
- Area: 224 hectares (550 acres)

Site history
- Built: 1938; 88 years ago
- In use: 1938–1943 (Royal Air Force); 1943–1945 (US Army Air Force); 1945 – present (Royal Air Force)

Garrison information
- Occupants: 57 Squadron

Airfield information
- Identifiers: ICAO: EGYE
- Elevation: 111.8 metres (367 ft) AMSL
Runways
Direction	Length and surface
06/24	1,868 metres (6,129 ft) Asphalt
10/28	1,318 metres (4,324 ft) Asphalt
18/36	1,280 metres (4,199 ft) Asphalt
- Source: UK MIL AIP Barkston Heath

Royal Air Force Barkston Heath or RAF Barkston Heath (ICAO: EGYE) is a Royal Air Force Relief Landing Ground under the command of RAF Cranwell near Grantham, Lincolnshire, England.

RAF Barkston Heath is the home of 57 Sqn's B Flight of No. 3 Flying Training School RAF (3 FTS). For a period between approximately 1995 and 2010, it operated the Slingsby T67M260 Firefly, followed by the Grob Tutor T.1 operated between 2010 and 2018.

No. 3 FTS currently provide elementary flying training for RAF and Royal Navy students on the Grob Prefect T.1. A secondary role of RAF Barkston Heath is as a Relief Landing Ground for the flying training activities at RAF Cranwell.

== History ==
Barkston Heath was constructed in 1936 and was initially used as a satellite station for RAF Cranwell.

=== United States Army Air Forces use ===
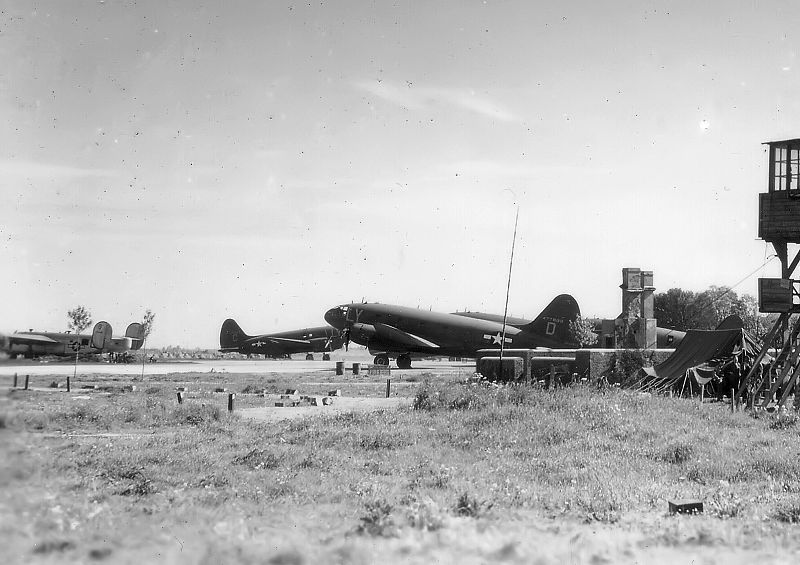
Aircraft assigned to 314th Troop Carrier Squadron at RAF Barkston Heath in 1945.

In late 1943, Barkston Heath was made available to the United States Army Air Force's Ninth Air Force. It was earmarked for basing troop carrier units scheduled to be transferred from Sicily to participate in the forthcoming cross-Channel invasion, Operation Overlord. During its time as a USAAF airfield, Barkston Heath was designated as USAAF station 483.

==== 61st Troop Carrier Group ====
The first US personnel arrived on 13 February from Sciacca, Sicily, and most of their Douglas C-47 Skytrains on the 17th and 18th, although not all aircraft were in place until a month later. These new occupants were the 61st Troop Carrier Group.

The 61st TCG was part of the 52nd Troop Carrier Wing, IX Troop Carrier Command. The headquarters of the 61st Troop Carrier Group moved to an Advanced Landing Ground (ALG) at Abbeville (ALG B-92), France, on 13 March 1945, but its squadrons went to RAF Chipping Ongar from where they participated in Operation Varsity on 24 March carrying British paratroops who dropped near Wesel.

==== 349th Troop Carrier Group ====
An increased demand for theatre air transport brought the 349th TCG from Baer Field, Indiana in late March 1945, with its Curtiss C-46 Commando transports. Group headquarters was established at Barkston on 30 March, but the group only remained three weeks before moving to Rove/Amy, France, on 18 April.

=== Royal Air Force use ===
The USAAF returned control of the airfield to the Air Ministry in June 1945 when the war in Europe ended. From 1983 to 1989 Barkston was home to 'A' Flight 25 Squadron (with Bristol Bloodhound surface-to-air missiles) when they returned from RAF Bruggen in Germany.

==== Elementary Flying Training ====
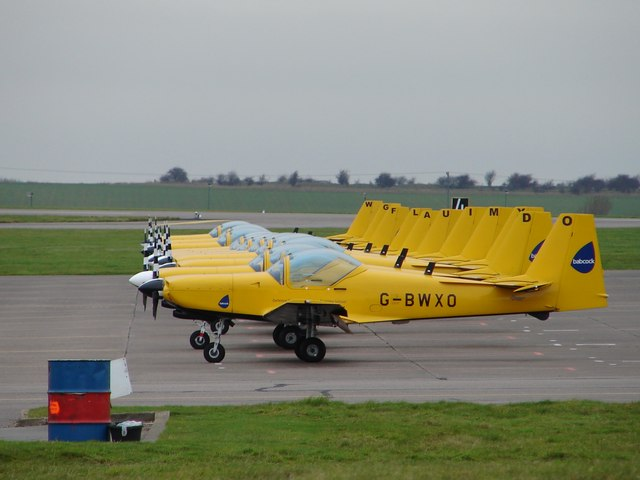
A line-up of Slingsby T67 Firefly aircraft of the Defence Flying Training School at Barkston Heath in 2008.

On 1 April 1995, the Joint Elementary Flying Training School (JEFTS), which provided training to RAF and Fleet Air Arm (FAA) pilots, relocated to Barkston Heath from RAF Topcliffe in North Yorkshire. The school was equipped with eighteen civilian registered Slingsby T67M Firefly trainer aircraft.

In 1996 the Army Air Corps (AAC) joined JEFTS and the school operated as a tri-service organisation until 2003 when the RAF decided to instead provide elementary flying training through its network of University Air Squadrons. JEFTS as a result was renamed the Defence Elementary Flying Training School in July 2003, with the FAA element re-establishing itself as 703 Naval Air Squadron (703 NAS) and the AAC element as No. 674 Squadron.

In November 2009 the Fireflies were retired and replaced with the Grob Tutor T.1.

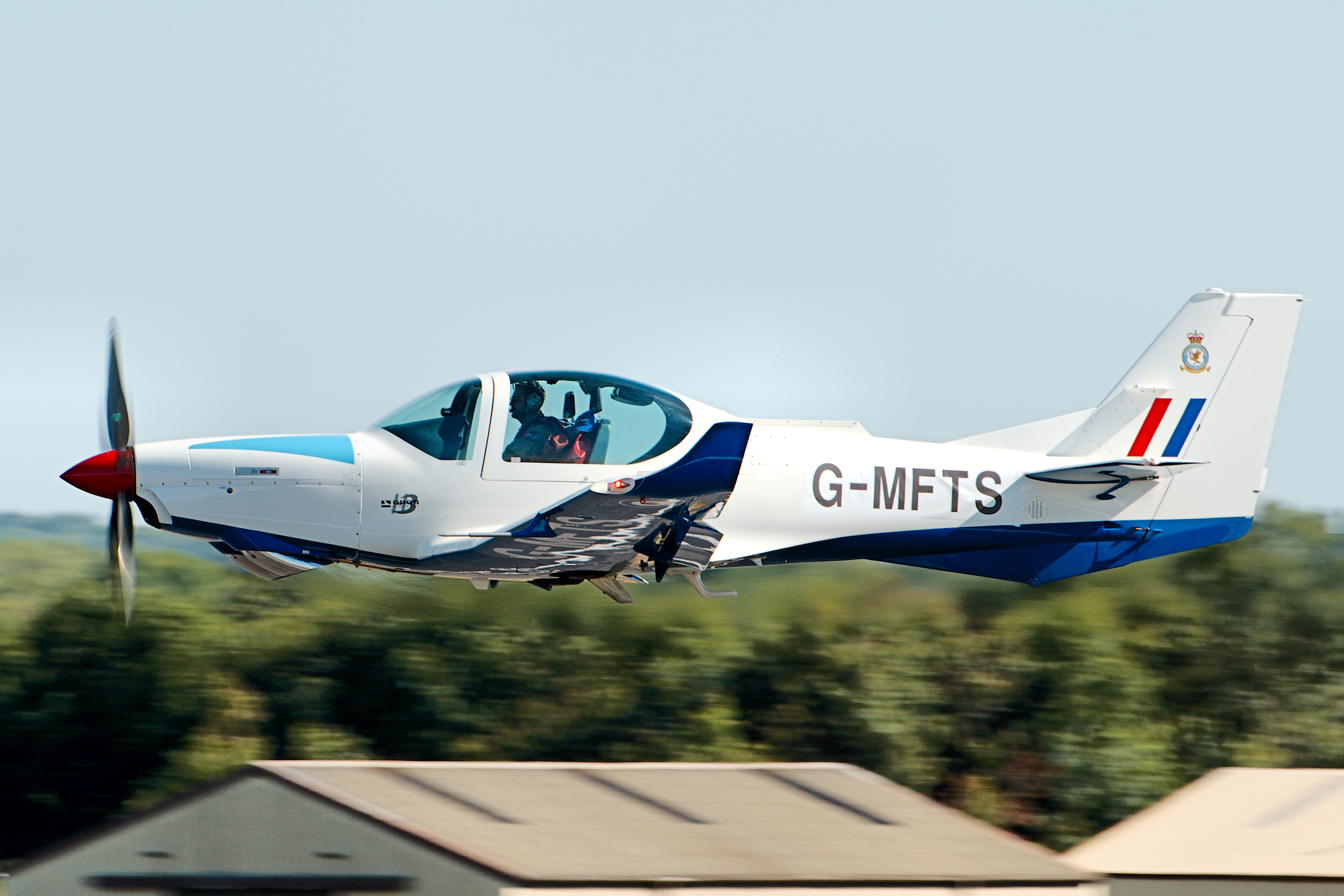
A Grob 120TP ‘Prefect’, formerly operated by 674 Sqn AAC.

674 Squadron AAC operated the Slingsby Firefly in the 1990s through to around 2007, the Grob 115 Tutor from around 2007 until acquisition of the Prefect T1 turboprop trainer in the late 2010s. Students from all three Services of the Armed Forces were trained during this time as well as a limited number of students from overseas, mainly from certain Gulf States. Training was delivered as part of the UK Military Flying Training System (UKMFTS) contract. The Squadron was temporarily stood down in April 2021 before reforming at Middle Wallop Flying Station and a transition to the flying grading role.

==== Heraldry ====
The squadron motto 'Nothing Is Impossible' was selected by the Regimental Committee of the Army Air Corps in order to perpetuate the memory of the Glider Pilot Regiment which bore the same motto.

The squadron crest bears the Sphinx of the Royal Lincolnshire Regiment, chosen because of the squadron's initial location at Barkston Heath in Lincolnshire and the close association of the Chief of the Defence Staff with the Army Air Corps (he was the Regimental Colonel) and the Royal Anglian Regiment, the successor to the Royal Lincolnshire Regiment.

=== Other units ===
The following units were also here at some point:

- No. 1 Elementary Flying Training School RAF
- No. 2 Central Flying School RAF
- No. 2 Flying Instructors School RAF
- No. 3 (Coastal) Operational Training Unit RAF
- No. 7 Equipment Disposal Depot RAF
- No. 85 Squadron RAF
- RAF College
- RAF College Flying Training School RAF
- RAF College Service Flying Training School RAF

== Infrastructure and facilities ==
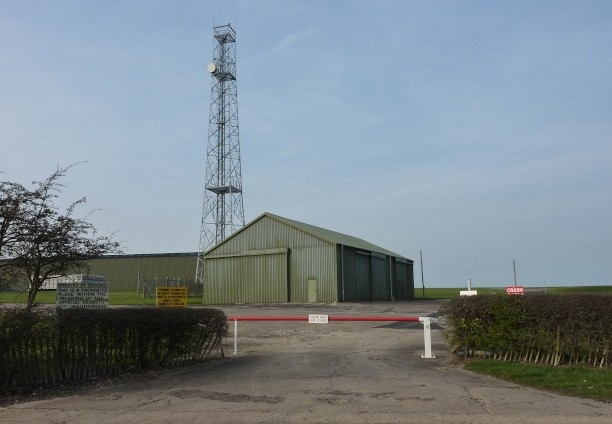
A communications mast, buildings and crash gate at RAF Barkston Heath.

The RAF Barkston Heath site extends to 224 hectares (550 acres). It has three runways, 06/24 which is 1,868 metres (6,129 ft) long, 10/28 which is 1,319 metres (4,327 ft) long and 18/36 which is 1,280 metres (4,199 ft) long, all constructed from asphalt.

The airfield has limited facilities and relies on its parent station RAF Cranwell for support. The main building at Barkston Heath is the Operational Support Building which was re-opened in January 2018 after refurbishment as part of the UK Military Flying Training System (UKMFTS) programme. It was renamed the Esmonde Building in memory of Lieutenant Commander Eugene Esmonde, a distinguished Fleet Air Arm pilot who was a posthumous recipient of the Victoria Cross.

Out of six T2 type hangar and one B1 type constructed during the Second World War, only two T2 type remain on the site.

The airfield contains the decaying remains of an English Electric Canberra at the northern edge of the airfield site.

== Role and operations ==
=== Defence Elementary Flying Training School ===
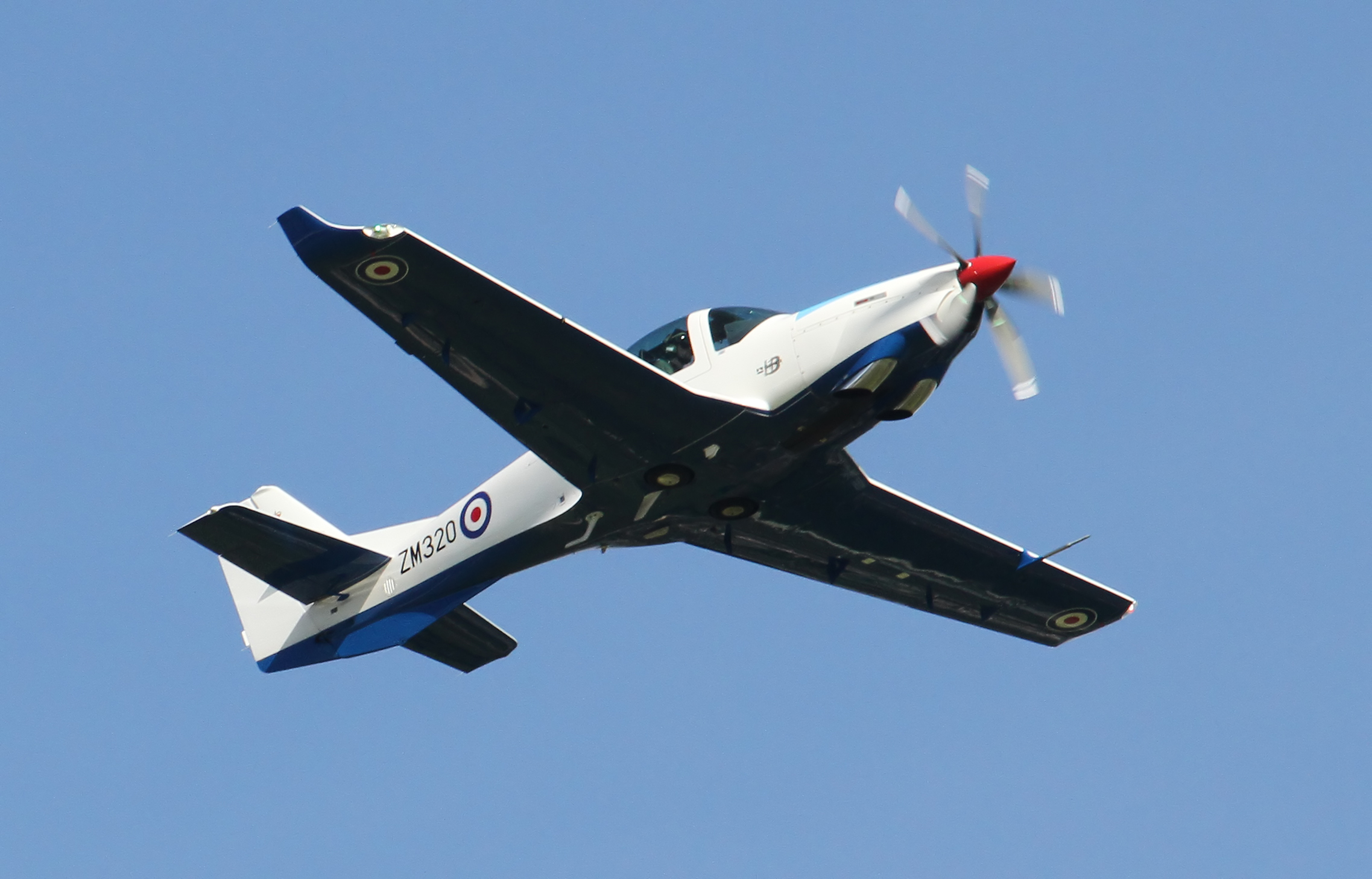
A Grob Prefect T1 trainer aircraft of the type based at RAF Barkston Heath.

RAF Barkston Heath is home to the Defence Elementary Flying Training School, comprising 57 Squadron RAF, operating the Grob Prefect T1 in the elementary flying training role. Aircraft and support are provided by a civilian contractor, Ascent Flight Training, as part of the UK Military Flying Training System contract. Ascent also provides a significant proportion of the instructional staff, the Air Traffic Control service is provided by NATS Solutions Ltd, Affinity provide engineering personnel and other Station support personnel are provided by NBC and the MoD.

Although the school trains Fleet Air Arm crews, it is under the command of the RAF's No. 3 Flying Training School, based at nearby RAF Cranwell.

==== 703 Naval Air Squadron ====
703 NAS trains Fleet Air Arm pilots destined to fly both rotary (AgustaWestland Merlin and AgustaWestland Wildcat) and fixed wing aircraft (Lockheed Martin F-35B II Lightning and BAE Hawk). Helicopter students graduate to No. 1 Flying Training School (1 FTS) at RAF Shawbury in Shropshire, whereas fast jet students move onto No. 4 Flying Training School at RAF Valley in Anglesey.

=== Relief Landing Ground ===
Barkston Heath acts as a Relief Landing Ground for the flying training activities at RAF Cranwell, which is four minutes flying time away.

== Based units ==
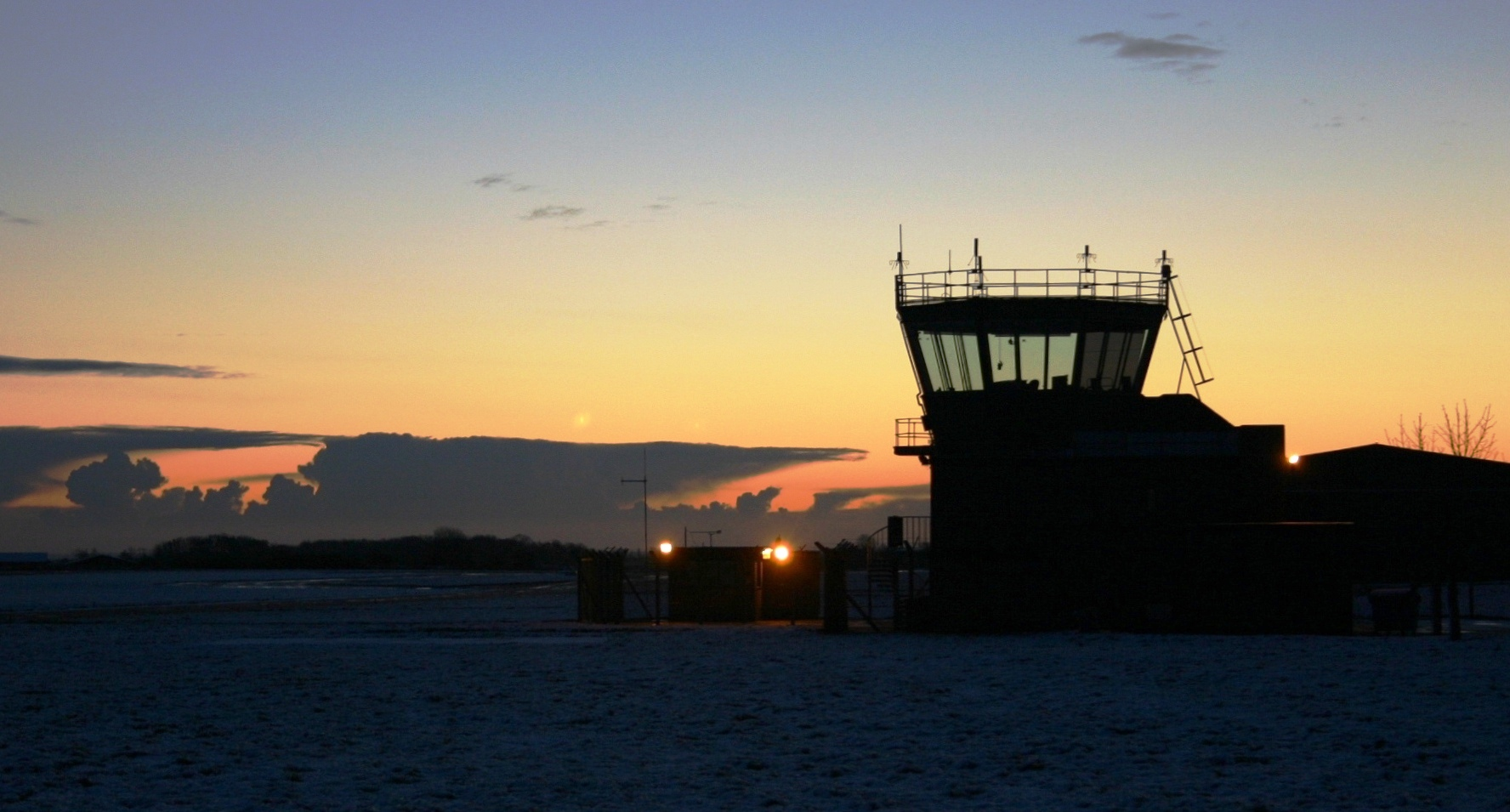
Barkston Heath ATC.

The following flying units are based at RAF Barkston Heath. The station is also regularly used as relief landing ground by aircraft based at nearby RAF Cranwell.

=== Royal Air Force ===
No. 22 Group (Training) RAF

- No. 3 Flying Training School / Defence Elementary Flying Training School
  - No. 57 Squadron – Grob Prefect T.1

== See also ==
- List of Royal Air Force stations
- List of Army Air Corps aircraft units
