= Abbeville Airfield =

Abbeville Aerodrome Aérodrome d'Abbeville - Buigny-Saint-Maclou (Advanced Landing Ground (ALG) B-92)
- IATA: none; ICAO: LFOI

Summary
- Airport type: Public
- Operator: CCI Abbeville
- Serves: Abbeville, France
- Location: Buigny-Saint-Maclou, France
- Elevation AMSL: 220 ft (67 m)
- Coordinates: 50°08′35″N 001°49′57″E

Maps
- Location of Picardy region in France

- Location of airfield in the Picardy region

Runways
Direction	Length		Surface
Direction	m	ft	Surface
02/20	1,250	4,101	Asphalt
02/20	900	2,953	Grass
13/31	570	1,870	Grass
- Sources: French AIP and UAF

The Abbeville Airfield (French: Aérodrome d'Abbeville) or Abbeville Aerodrome (ICAO: LFOI) is an airfield serving Abbeville and located in Buigny-Saint-Maclou, 4 km (2.5 mi) north-northeast of Abbeville, both communes of the Somme département in the Picardie region of France.

== History ==
It is not known when exactly the airfield was built, but it was in use with the British Expeditionary Forces in 1940. Detachments of No. 607 Squadron RAF with Gloster Gladiator biplanes were based here along with No. 151 Squadron RAF Hawker Hurricanes before they were withdrawn to English bases in June 1940 during the Battle of France.

It was seized by the Luftwaffe and became a German Fliegerhorst. The Luftwaffe immediately began preparing for the Battle of Britain and the airfield became home to Zerstörergeschwader 76 (ZG 76) with Bf 110Cs, and later Fw 190As of II./Jagdgeschwader 26 (JG 26) 'Schlageter' in December 1941. Judging from the layout of the airfield, it was the Luftwaffe that upgraded the airfield with three concrete runways in the familiar triangle configuration. The airfield was a major German fighter base between 1940 and 1943 with over 50 aircraft based here. JG 26 gained a considerable reputation with Allied pilots, who referred to the yellow nosed Bf 109s as the "Abbeville Boys", although they were never permanently at the base. Instead the Gruppen and Staffeln of the Geschwader moved from base to base throughout occupied Europe and used Abbeville only as their home base. From 1943 the first two Gruppen of JG 26 converted to the Fw 190A. III./JG 26 began conversion, but converted back and remained with the Bf 109 until the end of the war.

Abbeville was liberated by Polish troops around 3 September 1944. Soon after repairs to the battle damage to the airfield were begun. The airfield was only sparsely used however.

Only by March 1945 did a new unit arrive: 61st Troop Carrier Group (USAAF), who remained at the airfield until May. They never brought their C-47 Skytrain squadrons to the airfield though, as those were needed in England in preparation for Operation Varsity. It did provide services in the European theatre, hauling fuel, ammunition, food, medicine and other supplies, as well as performing Medevac flights. After the war the airfield was abandoned.

Today most of the airfield has been converted for other uses. Its former three runways are still recognisable from the air, but only one remains (partially) in use. While the east–west runways has almost completely been overgrown (or even removed), the former 13/31 concrete runway is still largely intact, although several buildings have been placed on it. Only the 02/20 runway is still fully visible, although a newer but smaller asphalt runway has been laid out on its surface. Two smaller grass runways compensate for the loss of the larger concrete runways. One building at the airfield appears to have been from World War II and remains in use.

== Facilities ==
The aerodrome is at an elevation of 220 feet (67 m) above mean sea level. It has one runway designated 02/20 with a concrete surface measuring 1,250 by 23 metres (4,101 ft × 75 ft).

== Airlines and destinations ==
No scheduled commercial air service as of early 2024.
