= Lourmel Airfield =

Military airfield in El Amria, Algeria

Lourmel Airfield
- Part of Twelfth Air Force

Site information
- Type: Military airfield
- Controlled by: United States Army Air Forces

Location
- Coordinates: 35.524726°N 1.014905°W

Site history
- Built: 1942
- In use: 1942-1943

Location of Lourmel Airfield, Algeria

Lourmel Airfield is an abandoned military airfield in Algeria, located in the El Amria area.

During World War II it was a civil airport seized by the United States Army during the Operation Torch landings in November 1942. After its capture from the Vichy French, it was used by the United States Army Air Force Twelfth Air Force 61st Troop Carrier Group during the North African Campaign.

The 61st flew C-47 Skytrain transports from the airfield from 15 May-21 June 1943.
