= Licata Airfield =

Abandoned World War II military airfield in Italy

Licata Airfield
- Part of Twelfth Air Force

Site information
- Type: Military airfield
- Controlled by: United States Army Air Forces

Location
- Coordinates: 37°06′04.61″N 013°55′58.66″E (approximate)

Site history
- Built: 1943
- In use: 1943-1944

Location of Licata Airfield, Italy

Licata Airfield is an abandoned World War II military airfield in Italy, located in the vicinity of Licata, Sicily. It was a temporary fighter airfield constructed in the immediate aftermath of Operation Husky by U.S. Army Engineers using pierced steel planking for its runway, parking and dispersal areas, not designed for heavy aircraft or for long-term use.

The 33d Fighter Group operated P-40 Warhawks from the field between 18 July and 13 September 1943, supporting ground forces as they advanced and attacking enemy aircraft on the air and ground.

After the 33d moved out to Paestum on the Italian mainland, the airfield was used by the 61st Troop Carrier Group, which operated C-47 Skytrain transports from the field from 1 September to 6 October 1943. Afterwards, it was used as a casualty and resupply airfield during the early days of the Italian Campaign. After the war, the airfield was dismantled.

Today, there are no remaining traces of the airfield as the urban growth of the Licata area has expanded over the area, and obliterated any trace of the airfield. It is unclear precisely where the airfield was located due to the changed landscape over the past decades.
