= Eschborn Airfield =

Former German military airfield

Eschborn Airfield Advanced Landing Ground (ALG) Y-51 Fliegerhorst Eschborn

- Hesse, Germany Eschborn Airfield (Germany)

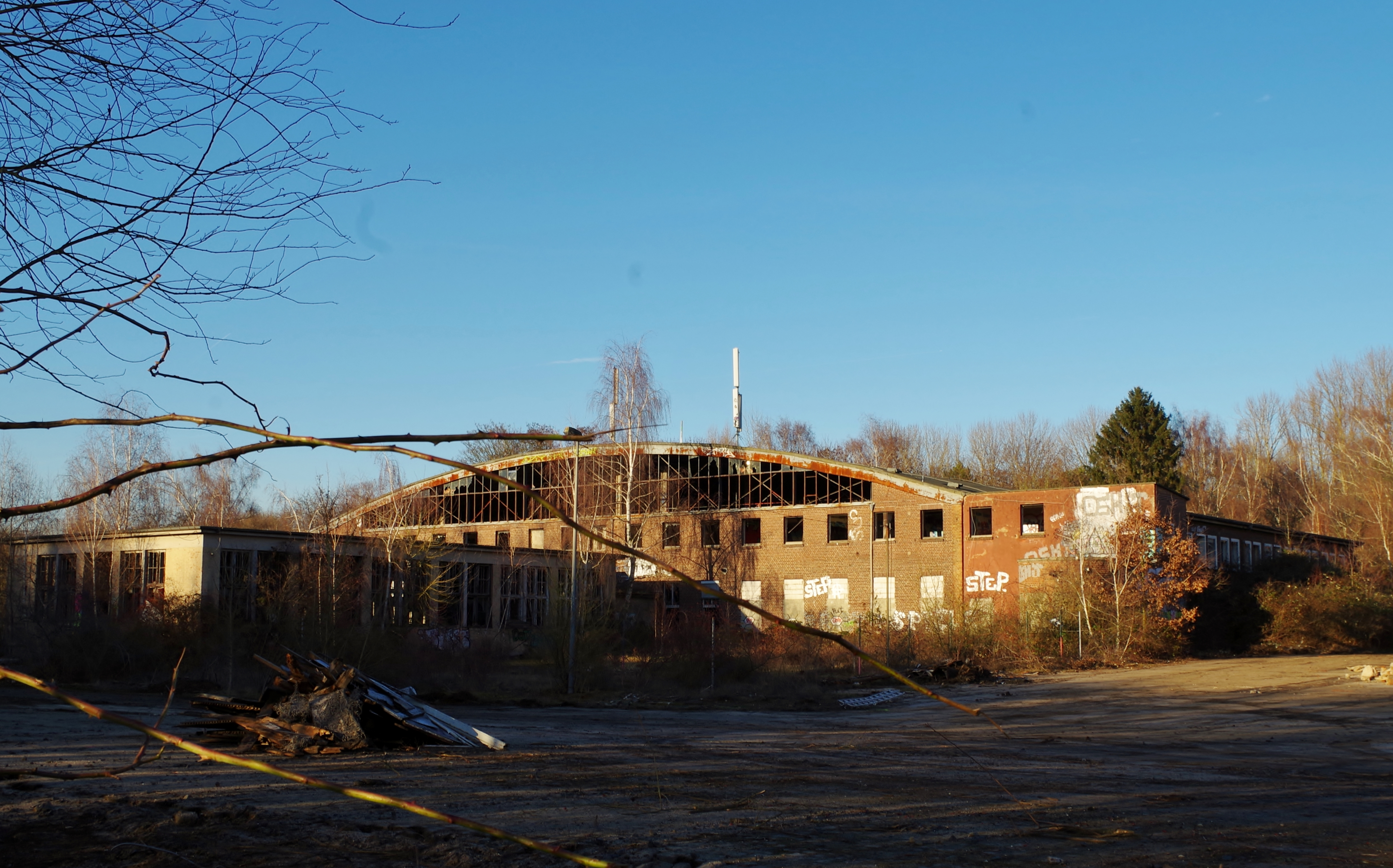
- Decaying Hangar Aviator Horst German Luftwaffe in Eschborn

Site information
- Type: Military airfield
- Condition: abandoned

Location
- Coordinates: 50°07′57″N 008°33′09″E

Site history
- Built: 1940s
- Built by: Luftwaffe
- In use: 1943-1945 (Luftwaffe); Mar-July 1945 (USAAF); 1945-1992 United States Army

Eschborn Airfield (Fliegerhorst Eschborn) is an abandoned military airfield in Germany located approximately 10 km northwest of Frankfurt am Main (Hessen) and 435 km southwest of Berlin.

The airfield was built by the Luftwaffe and opened in the early 1940s. Its primary use was as an interceptor fighter airfield during the Defense of the Reich campaign. In 1945 it was seized by the United States Army and was used as a combat airfield by Ninth Air Force during the Western Allied invasion of Germany.

After the war the airfield became part of "Camp Eschborn", one of the United States Army facilities in the Frankfurt Area. It was closed in 1992 as part of the drawdown of American forces in Europe after the Cold War ended. Today the area is being redeveloped as an industrial site.

== History ==
=== German use during World War II ===
Eschborn Airfield was built by the Luftwaffe about 1942 to provide air defense of the Frankfurt am Main area from Allied bomber attacks. A 1,600 meters (5,200 ft) concrete runway, aligned 12/30 was laid down, along with taxiways, dispersal aircraft hardstands, a support area and other buildings.

Jagdgeschwader 106 (JG 106), a Focke-Wulf Fw 190A day interceptor fighter unit was assigned to the airfield in March 1943. In August 1943, JG 106 was moved to Mannheim and replaced by JG 27, a Messerschmitt Bf 109G unit that was being withdrawn from North Africa. JG 27 was based at Eschborn until September 1944. Other Luftwaffe day interceptor units assigned to Eschborn were JG 53 (March–May 1944); JG 301 (May–June 1944) and JG 2 (September 1944), flying mostly Bf 109Gs, or Fw 190As (JG 2).

In response to the interceptor attacks on Eighth Air Force heavy bomber formations, Eschborn was attacked in 1944 by XIII Fighter Command P-51 Mustang escort fighters that would drop down on the airfield and perform fighter sweeps over targets of opportunity. As Allied ground forces moved east into Central France, the airfield came within range of Ninth Air Force air units, which attacked the airfield with Martin B-26 Marauder medium bombers and Republic P-47 Thunderbolts. These attacks would take place when Eighth Air Force heavy bombers (Boeing B-17 Flying Fortresses, Consolidated B-24 Liberators) were within interception range of the Luftwaffe aircraft assigned to the base, with the attacks being timed to have the maximum effect possible to keep the interceptors pinned down and unable to attack the heavy bombers.

=== USAAF use ===
United States Third Army units moved into the Frankfurt area during mid-March 1945, and ground forces captured Eschborn Airfield about 25 March. On 30 March, combat engineers from IX Engineer command 832d and 825th Engineering Aviation Battalions arrived to make the airfield operational for aircraft of the United States Army Air Forces (USAAF). A Pierced Steel Planking runway was laid down over the damaged concrete runway and enough repairs were made to make the airfield operational by early April. The airfield was designated as Advanced Landing Ground "Y-74 Frankfurt/Eschborn" and immediately put to use as a transport resupply and casualty (S&E) evacuation airfield. Douglas C-47 Skytrain transports used the airfield frequently.

On 7 April, Ninth Air Force Republic P-47 Thunderbolts arrived at Eschborn. The 371st Fighter Group and the 367th Fighter Group flew combat missions with Thunderbolts until the end of the war in May. The 367th remained at the airfield until mid-July 1945 when the USAAF turned the Eschborn airfield and base over to Army ground forces, which used the facility as an occupation garrison.

=== United States Army use ===
Under Army control in July 1945, for a while Eschborn became a Displaced Persons camp while Europe tried to sort out the masses of people forcefully removed from their home nations during the war. Also, Eschborn remained an Air Technical Service Command facility until 1947 to process out excess American aircraft and to destroy surrendered Luftwaffe aircraft. The Luftwaffe buildings were repaired and reconstructed, the facility eventually becoming a major Army garrison as part of the Army of Occupation.

During the 1950s, as a part of the United States Army NATO facilities in the Frankfurt area, the airfield was closed and Eschborn Airfield became "Camp Eschborn", the home of Army Engineering units. Army forces remained at Eschborn for the next 40 years during the Cold War, being withdrawn in 1992 as part of the general American drawdown of forces in Germany.

=== Incidents ===
From May 1945 to October 1946 there were at least 6 aviation accidents at Eschborn Air Base. Among them was a Douglas DC-3/C-47A-20-DL transport aircraft (aircraft registration 42-23466) of the United States Army Air Forces (USAAF), which had an accident during take-off on 18 September 1945 and was damaged beyond repair.

=== Abandoned ===
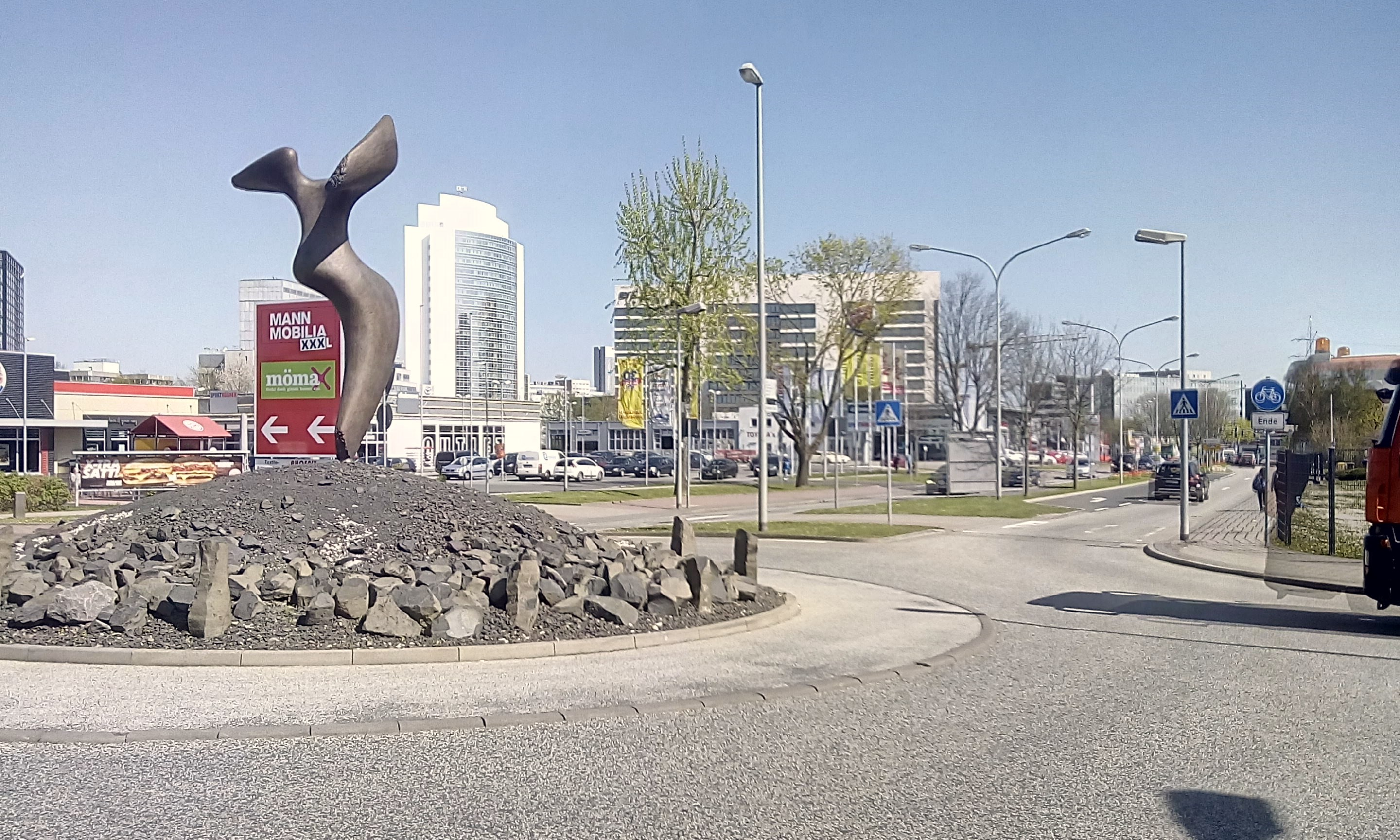
The commercial area Camp Phoenix-Park covers 24 hectares (59 acres) and is located at the Autobahn A66. In the foreground the sculpture Phoenix from Oliver Ritter in the center of a roundabout of Elly-Beinhorn-Street.

The facility has been basically abandoned since 1992, and today the ghostly relics of empty buildings, streets and other facilities used by the United States Army during its use for many decades of Eschborn remain. Parts of the former military base are being redeveloped for the Arboretum Main-Taunus and into a commercial area (Camp Phoenix-Park). The airfield, not used since 1992, remains in part with an abandoned aircraft parking apron and a large Luftwaffe hangar, used for storage by the Army, but now a reminder of the wartime past of Eschborn as a combat airfield by both German and United States forces.

== See also ==
- Advanced Landing Ground
