= 11th Bomb Squadron =

US Air Force unit

11th Bomb Squadron

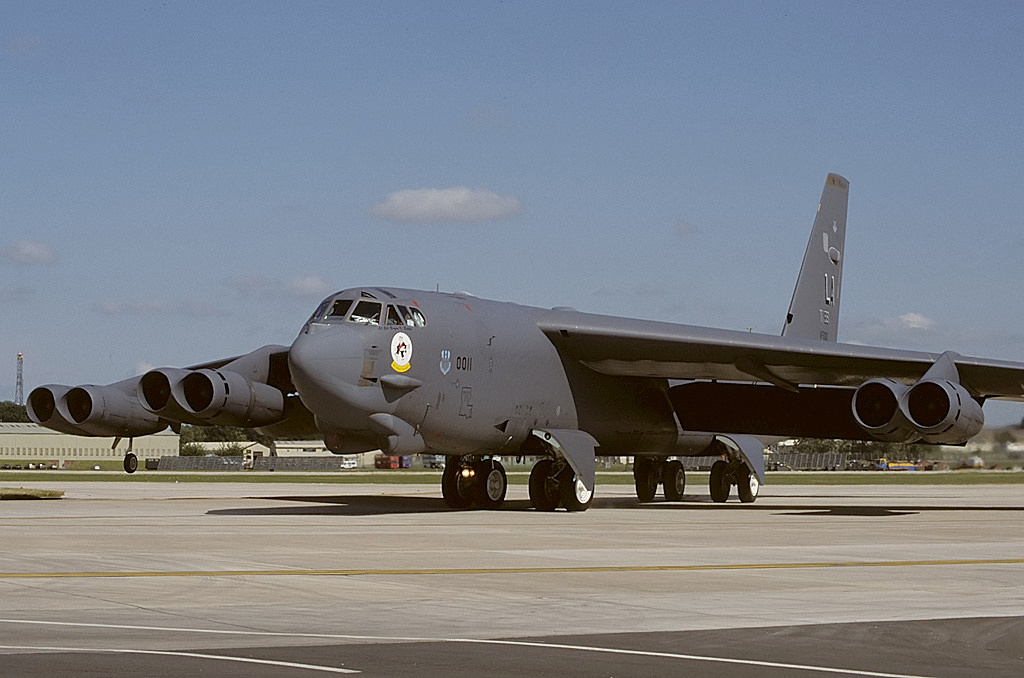
- 11th Bomb Squadron commander's B-52H
- Active: 1917–1927; 1928–1945; 1954–1958; 1982–1991; 1994–present
- Country: United States
- Branch: United States Air Force
- Type: Squadron
- Role: Strategic Bombing
- Part of: Global Strike Command
- Garrison/HQ: Barksdale Air Force Base, Louisiana.
- Nickname(s): Jiggs Squadron or Bewilderment Group (World War I)
- Colors: Gold and Black
- Mascot(s): Mr. Jiggs
- Engagements: World War I; World War II – Antisubmarine; World War II – Asia-Pacific

- Decorations: Distinguished Unit Citation (2x); Air Force Outstanding Unit Award (9x)

Insignia
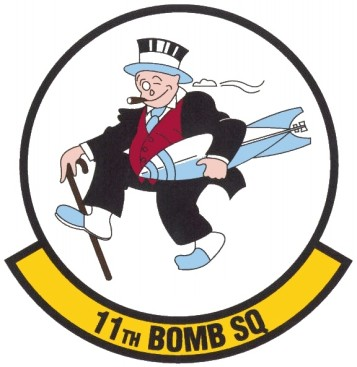
- 11th Bomb Squadron emblem (Note: Approved 3 March 1924. Description: Mr. Jiggs with an aerial bomb under his arm, on a white disc.)

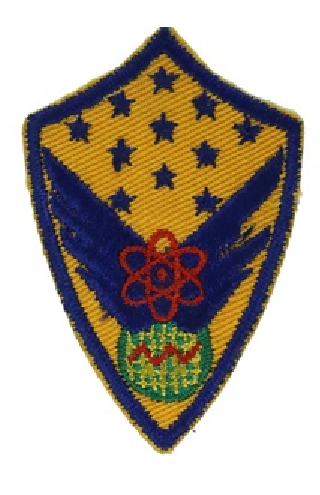
- 11th Tactical Missile Squadron emblem (Note: Approved 12 May 1955. Description: On an Air Force yellow shield, with Air Force blue edge, a pair of wings of the last color, tips upward; centered on the wings a red nuclear design; the base of the wings over a green disc oscilloscope pattern, in base, the screen of the first color, and the streak marking red; the chief of the shield spattered with eleven stars of the second color. Significance: The eleven stars of blue represent the numerical designation of the squadron. The wings signify "flight" pertaining to the type of aircraft in operation. The nuclear design represents the atomic warfare connected with guided missiles; the oscilloscope pattern is to signify work being performed by the guidance and communications branches within the organization.)

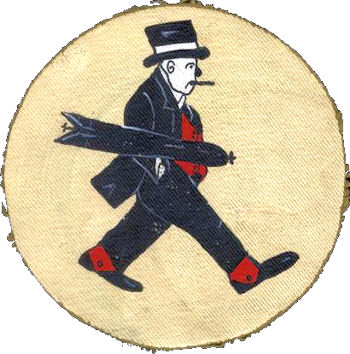
- 11th Aero Squadron emblem (Note: Approved by American Expeditionary Forces 18 November 1918.)
- Tail Code: LA

The 11th Bomb Squadron is a unit of the United States Air Force, 2d Operations Group, 2d Bomb Wing located at Barksdale Air Force Base, Louisiana. The 11th is equipped with the Boeing B-52H Stratofortress.

The 11th is one of the oldest units in the United States Air Force, first being organized as the 11th Aero Squadron on 26 June 1917 at Kelly Field, Texas. The squadron deployed to France and fought on the Western Front during World War I as a Day Bombardment squadron. It took part in the St. Mihiel offensive and the Meuse-Argonne offensive.

During World War II the unit served in the Pacific Theater of Operations as a Boeing B-17 Flying Fortress heavy of the Fifth Air Force from 14 January to 1 March 1942, it operated against the Japanese advancing through the Philippines and Netherlands East Indies. The reorganized North American B-25 Mitchell medium bomber squadron resumed combat from bases in India under Tenth Air Force (May 1942 to 11 March 1942) and bases in China under the Fourteenth Air Force (11 March 1943 to Aug 1945) against targets in Burma, China and South China Sea. During the Cold War it was both a tactical Martin TM-61 Matador and BGM-109G Ground Launched Cruise Missile squadron as part of the United States Air Forces in Europe.

== Mission ==
"Provide frontline units with the highest quality B-52 aviators capable of maintaining the highest standards of conduct and performance required to assume the nation’s special trust and responsibility for the world’s most powerful weapons".

== History ==
=== World War I ===
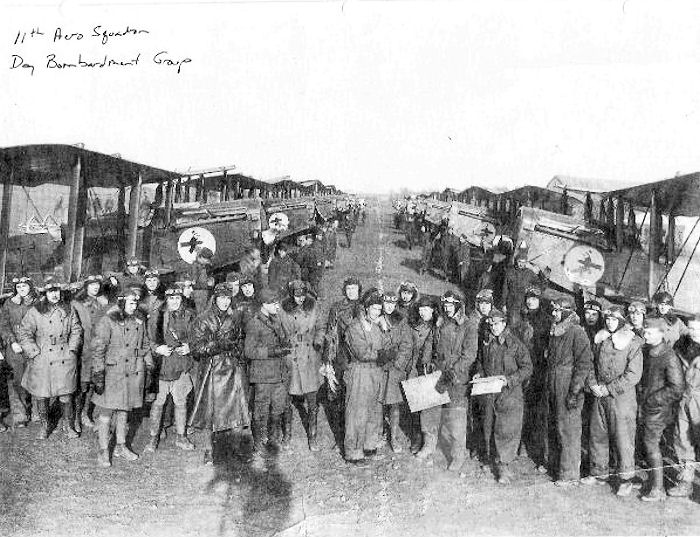
11th Aero Squadron posing with its Dayton-Wright DH-4s (Note: Note "Mr Jiggs" on each fuselage, Maulan Airdrome, France, November 1918.)

After training in the United States, the squadron sailed for Europe on the RMS Orduna on 18 December 1917. The 11th saw combat as a day bombardment unit with First Army, 14 September 1918, which was a bloody baptism of fire. But an attempted raid the following day practically devastated the fledgling squadron. "Out of a formation of six planes which crossed the lines," remembered surviving veteran Paul S. Green, "only one succeeded in staggering back in a riddled condition." Henceforward, the 11th Squadron, earlier designated the "Jiggs Squadron" was unkindly referred to throughout the U.S. Air Service as the "Bewilderment Group." Jiggs was a cartoon character invented five years before by an 11th Squadron officer, George McManus, whose comic strip, Bringing Up Father, was the first of its kind to attract a worldwide readership. The Bewilderment Group's emblem featured the famous Jiggs with a bomb tucked under his arm. The 11th flew combat from then to 5 November 1918.

=== Intra-War period ===
With the end of World War I, the 11th Aero Squadron returned to New York Harbor. It arrived in about 30 April where it transferred to Camp Mills, Long Island the next day. There most of the men of the 11th Aero Squadron were demobilized and returned to civilian life.

On 26 May 1919, the 11th transferred to Ellington Field, Texas, where it was manned and equipped with war surplus Dayton-Wright DH-4s. Its mission was to take part in the United States Army Border Air Patrol along the Mexican Border. Between August and November 1919, it operated from Marfa Field, and flew a border patrol along the Rio Grande between Lajitas, Texas to El Paso, Texas. It moved to Kelly Field, Texas on 8 November 1919 and again became part of the 1st Day Bombardment Group, although it remained on standby if needed along the Mexican Border.

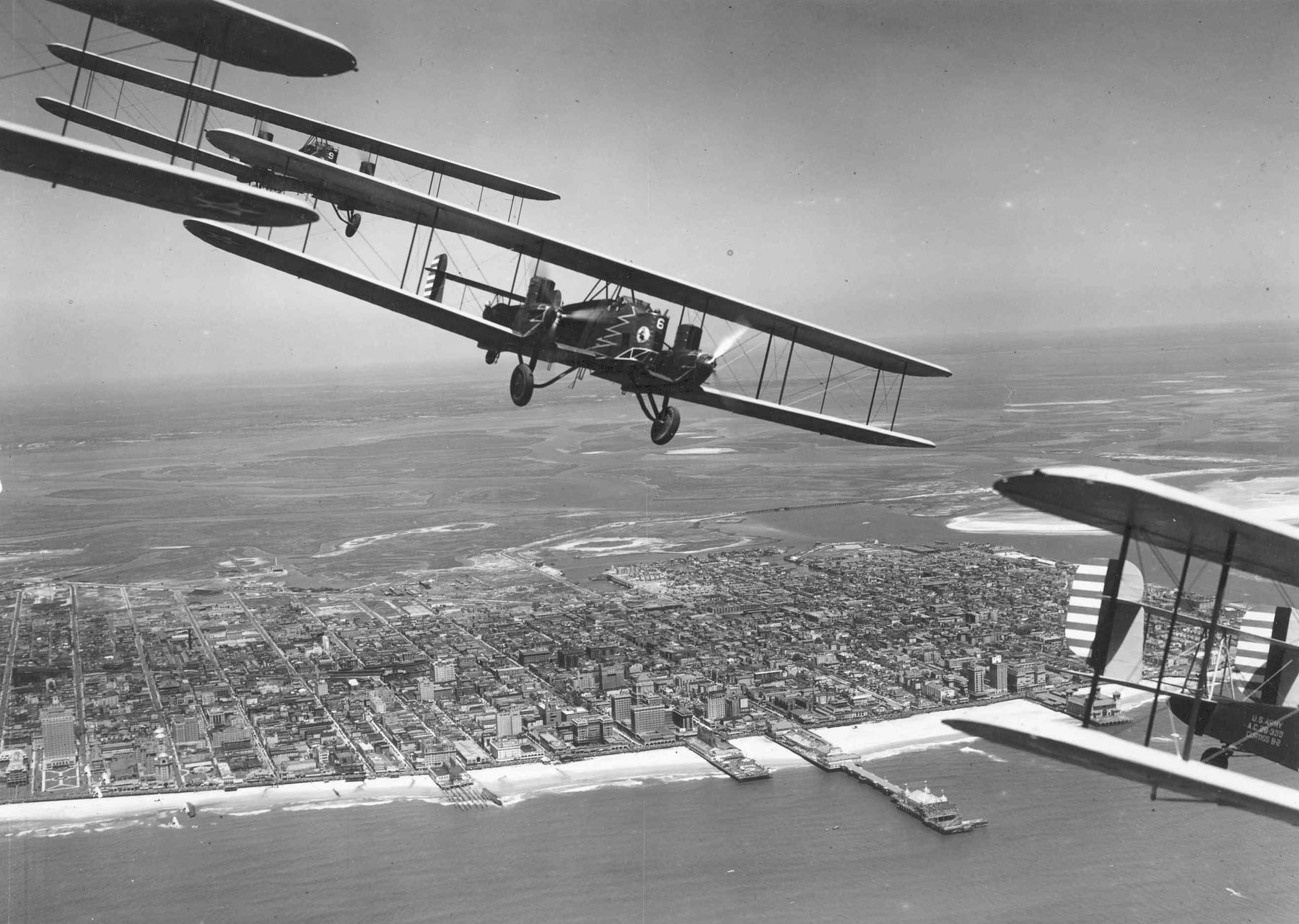
11th Bombardment Squadron Curtiss B-2 Condor formation flight over Atlantic City, New Jersey

In 1921 the squadron was redesignated 11th Squadron (Bombardment), and in 1922 as the 11th Bombardment Squadron. Transferred on 30 June 1922 to Langley Field, Virginia, and conducted bombing tests on obsolete warships off Chesapeake Bay. The squadron was assigned to the Air Corps Training Center and transferred on 3 June 1927 to March Field, California, where it was inactivated on 31 July 1927 and its personnel transferred to the 54th School Squadron.

The squadron was reactivated on 1 June 1928 at Rockwell Field, California, and assigned to the 7th Bombardment Group. It moved on 29 October 1931 to March Field. The squadron conducted food relief airdrop missions to native Americans snowed-in on reservations in Arizona, New Mexico and Utah during 16–21 January 1932; and for marooned miners north of Las Vegas, New Mexico on 13 February 1933; it was awarded the Mackay Trophy for the 1932 relief flights.

The squadron moved on 5 December 1934 to Hamilton Field, California. The 11th furnished the cadre to activate the 22d Bombardment Squadron (Heavy) on 20 October 1939. These future "Flying Falcons" operated the Douglas B-18 Bolo bomber and the Northrop A-17 attack aircraft. After gathering personnel and equipment at Hamilton Field and conducting training, the units then re-equipped with the Boeing B-17 Flying Fortress, moving on to Fort Douglas, Utah (later Salt Lake City Army Air Base) on 7 September 1940. Both squadrons performed rescue and patrol duties from Fort Douglas c. 21 Jun − 13 November 1941.

In November 1941 the squadrons prepared for reassignment to the Philippines. The ground echelons sailed from San Francisco on 21 November with the air echelons expected to remain in the States until the ground echelon arrived in the Philippines. Before their arrival, however, the Japanese attacked Pearl Harbor on 7 December and shortly thereafter began the campaign against the Philippines.

=== World War II ===
==== Netherlands East Indies campaign ====
Following the Japanese attack on Pearl Harbor, the air echelons of the 11th conducted antisubmarine patrols along the California coast from Muroc Army Air Field, California from 8 to 12 December 1941 before moving on out into the Pacific Theater. Assigned to detached duty to the United States Navy at Brisbane, Australia on 22 December 1941, the squadron flew combat while operating from Hickam Field, Hawaii between 18 December 1941 and 5 January 1942.

Japanese forces attacked the Netherlands East Indies at about the same time the air echelon of the 11th arrived, beginning a battle that ended in the withdrawal of United States forces in early March. During the unsuccessful defense of the Indies, the main body of the squadron flew from Hollandia, meanwhile a detachment operated under Navy control from the Fiji Islands and then from Australia.

Major Austin A. Straubel (4 September 1904 – 3 February 1942) was commander of the 11th Bombardment Squadron and acting commander of the 7th Bombardment Group when he died from burns received in the crash of a B-18 Bolo near Surabaya, Java. (Note: Austin Straubel International Airport, near Green Bay, Wisconsin, is named after Austin Straubel.)

In early March 1942, the 11th withdrew to Melbourne, Australia, remaining there for about a month. In April 1942 the squadron transferred all of its equipment and personnel to the 19th Bombardment Group.

==== China Air Task Force ====
The squadron returned to the United States in mid-1942, leaving B-17s in Australia and being re-equipped under the Third Air Force as a North American B-25 Mitchell medium bombardment squadron. With the cadre units in place at Columbia Army Air Base, South Carolina, other personnel began to arrive from various parts of the U.S., by far the biggest contingent coming in from Keesler Field, Mississippi.

While this build-up was going on an advance cadre of the ground element of the 11th were establishing the organization in the China-Burma-India Theater (CBI). That cadre arrived at Karachi Airport, India (now Pakistan) on 20 May 1942, working their way to their staging base at Allahabad Airfield, India, by 27 May, and moving on to Kunming Airport, China by 14 June. The unit was among the first few bomber units in the CBI. The aircraft were readied for flight operations by Air Technical Service Command at Karachi Air Depot and dispatched to Chakulia Airfield, India (now Bangladesh) in December.

In the middle of April 1942, the air element of the 11th, consisting of trained B-25 combat crews, began to arrive at Morrison Field, Florida, as part of Project 157. Each crew was assigned an aircraft. Some two weeks were spent outfitting the B-25s, testing all the apparatus, and getting the crews accustomed to working together. The night of 2 May 1942, the first crews left for overseas, flying along the South Atlantic Ferry Route initially bound for Natal, Brazil. The B-25s were not only completely fitted and ready for immediate combat, but were loaded with a great variety of extra ground equipment for maintaining aircraft and crews. Every one of the aircraft had at least 500 pounds over the maximum weight overload for safe flight and this route had never been flown over by combat crews before, as Air Corps Ferrying Command pilots had flown Mitchells along the route only with gasoline in the fuel tanks carrying little else.

Once reaching Natal, the ferrying route to Accra in the Gold Coast was taken, then across southern Africa to Khartoum, Sudan. The aircraft were then flown through Aden and followed the old British Imperial Airways route around the southern part of Arabia and Iran to Karachi. At Accra, several B-25s picked up formations of six to eight Curtiss P-40 Warhawks which had landed from an aircraft carrier. Many of these same P-40s and pilots later flew escort on missions in China. Three aircraft never reached India and some arrived several months after the others. By the end of May 1942 most of the other crews of Project 157 arrived in Karachi and were assigned to the 11th Bombardment Squadron.

On 2 June 1942, six B-25s left Allahabad on a secret mission of 15 days' duration. Each aircraft carried one extra crewman to act as relief during the expected two weeks' activity. This was to be the first tactical mission of the 11th Bombardment Squadron as a B-25 squadron. That night saw them at Dinjan, India, in the Assam Valley and the western end of the ferry route across the Hump into Southern China. At 0600 hours the next morning the flights took off for Kunming, China, detouring by way of Lashio, Burma. By 10 June, eight B-25s had reached their base at Kunming. The 11th Bombardment Squadron was the first United States air combat unit in China. Until their arrival, only the American Volunteer Group (AVG) was flying combat missions.

Operating under the provisional China Air Task Force (CATF) at Kunming, the first combat mission in China was on 1 July 1942, against shipping in the Hankow area, with AVG fighters flying escort. No opposition of any kind was found. The next day, three B-25s made a return trip to Hankow, this time concentrating on the warehouse and docking facilities.

On 15 September 1942 the 11th was transferred from the 7th Bombardment Group to the 341st Bombardment Group. The 341st Group usually functioned as if it were two groups, with its headquarters and three of its squadrons, the 22d, 490th and 491st Bombardment Squadrons operating under the Tenth Air Force in India and flying missions against the Japanese in Burma until January 1944; when the 341st was redeployed, the 490th was attached to the Tenth AF while the remainder of the Group joined the 11th in China. Throughout 1942–43, the 11th was attached to and received its operational orders from the CATF, which later became the Fourteenth Air Force.

From several airfields in China the group engaged primarily in attacking enemy concentrations and storage areas and in conducting sea sweeps and attacks against inland shipping. They also bombed and strafed such targets as trains, harbors and railroads in French Indochina (now Vietnam) and the Canton-Hong Kong area of China. The 341st Bomb Group received a Distinguished Unit Citation for special success in applying 'Glip' bombing technique (modified from Skip / Glide) against enemy bridges in the Hanoi region of French Indochina.

In July 1945, selected pilots, navigators and engineer-gunners were sent to Fenni, India for transition training in the Douglas A-26 Invader. After completing training, they flew their A-26s to China and were involved in a move from Yangkai to Laohwangping Airfield when the Pacific War ended before they could fly any combat missions. Three missions to drop leaflets announcing the war's end were performed before the squadron was ordered to India.

The 11th's A-26 crews remained to ferry their aircraft to Germany, where they would get caught up flying transports moving American personnel headed home to ports of embarkation. The rest of the squadron's personnel sailed back to the United States. The 11th Bombardment Squadron (M) was inactivated on 2 November 1945, the day after the squadron personnel disembarked at Newark, New Jersey.

=== Cold War ===
The 11th Pilotless Bomber Squadron was activated in 1954 as a Martin B-61 Matador tactical missile squadron under Ninth Air Force. It was subsequently redesignated the 11th Tactical Missile Squadron on 8 June 1955, and on 1 July 1956 the 11th deployed to Europe attached to the 7382nd Guided Missile Group (Tactical) at Hahn Air Base, West Germany, assigned to United States Air Forces in Europe. It was reassigned to the 587th Tactical Missile Group, which replaced the 7382d at Hahn.

On 18 June 1958, the 11th was inactivated and replaced with the 822d Tactical Missile Squadron, with the activation of the 38th Tactical Missile Wing and the inactivation of the 701st Tactical Missile Wing.

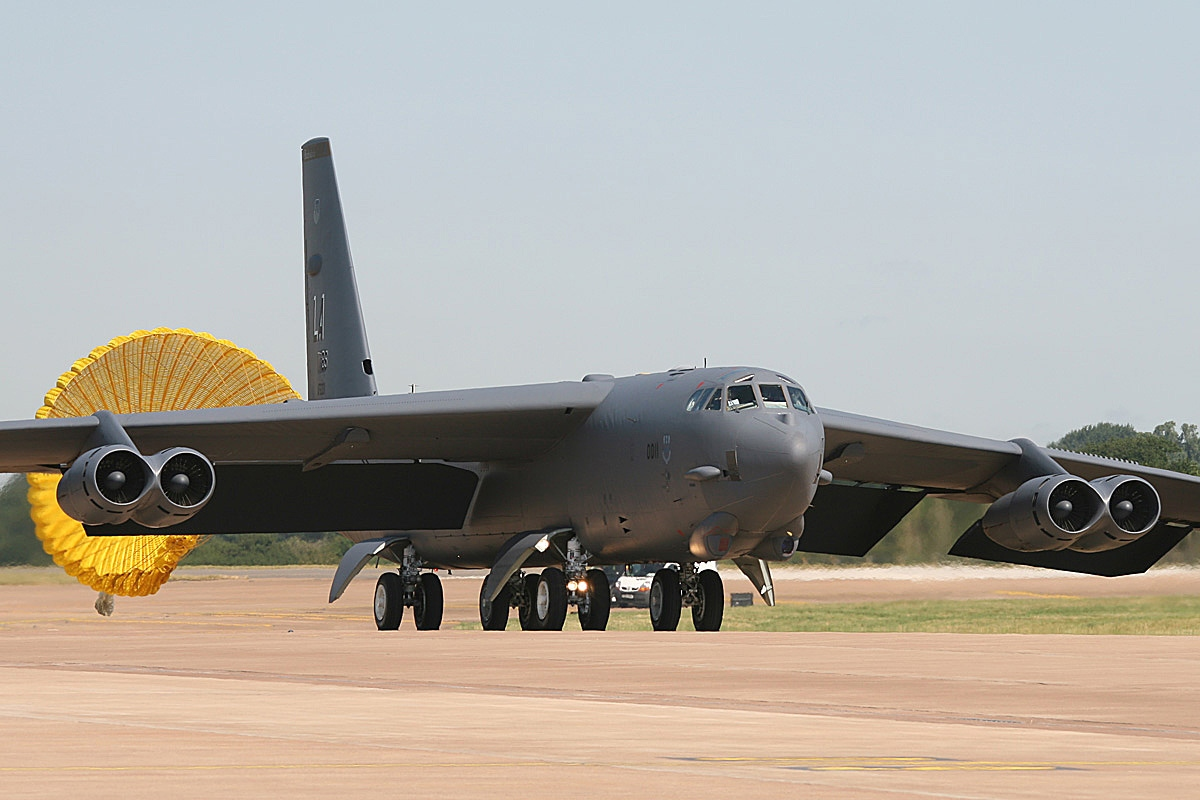
11th Bomb Squadron's B-52H at RAF Fairford

The 11th was reactivated in 1982 as a BGM-109G Ground Launched Cruise Missile squadron at RAF Greenham Common, England. Just before activation, it was consolidated with the 11th Bombardment Squadron. The squadron was inactivated in 1991 with the elimination of GLCMs from Europe as a result of the Intermediate-Range Nuclear Forces Treaty.

=== Return to bombardment operations ===
The 11th was redesignated as a heavy bomber squadron and equipped with Boeing B-52Hs at Barksdale AFB in 1994 as part of Air Combat Command; it was reassigned to Global Strike Command in 2010.

Since 1994, it has trained B-52 combat crews, maintained readiness to deploy in support of national objectives, and maintained ability to sustain heavy firepower in global situations.

== Lineage ==
11th Bombardment Squadron

- Organized as the 11th Aero Squadron (Day Bombardment) on 26 June 1917

Redesignated 11th Squadron (Bombardment) on 14 March 1921
Redesignated 11th Bombardment Squadron on 25 January 1923
Inactivated on 31 July 1927

- Activated on 1 June 1928

Redesignated 11th Bombardment Squadron (Heavy) on 6 December 1939
Redesignated 11th Bombardment Squadron (Medium) on 15 September 1942
Redesignated 11th Bombardment Squadron, Medium on 9 October 1944
Inactivated on 2 November 1945

- Consolidated with the 11th Tactical Missile Squadron as the 11th Tactical Missile Squadron on 11 January 1982

11th Bomb Squadron

- Constituted as the 11th Pilotless Bomber Squadron, Light on 17 June 1954

Activated on 1 September 1954
Redesignated 11th Tactical Missile Squadron on 8 June 1955
Inactivated on 18 June 1958

- Consolidated with the 11th Bombardment Squadron on 11 January 1982

Activated on 1 October 1982
Inactivated on 31 May 1991

- Redesignated 11th Bomb Squadron on 24 June 1994

Activated on 1 July 1994

=== Assignments ===
- Unknown, 26 June 1917–September 1918
- 1st Day Bombardment Group, 10 September–November 1918
- Unknown, November 1918–25 May 1919
- Southern Department, 26 May 1919
- 1st Day Bombardment Group (later 2d Bombardment) Group), 18 September 1919
- Air Corps Training Center, 18–31 July 1927
- 7th Bombardment Group, 1 June 1928 (attached to 17th Bombardment Group, 26 April–2 May 1942)
- 341st Bombardment Group, 15 September 1942 – 2 November 1945
- Ninth Air Force, 1 September 1954
- United States Air Forces in Europe, 1 July 1956 (attached to 7382d Guided Missile Group after 1 July 1956)
- 587th Tactical Missile Group, 15 September 1956 – 18 June 1958
- 501st Tactical Missile Wing, 1 October 1982 – 31 May 1991
- 2d Operations Group, 1 July 1994 – present

=== Stations ===
- Kelly Field, Texas, 26 June 1917
- Scott Field, Illinois, 12 August 1917
- Aviation Concentration Center, Garden City, New York, 6 December 1917
- Glasgow, Scotland, 31 December 1917
- Winchester, England, 1 January 1918

Flight A, D detached to: RFC Stamford, England
Flight B detached to: RFC Harling Road, England
Flight C detached to: RFC Feltwell, England

- RFC Stamford, England, 1 May 1918
- Winchester, England, 7 August 1918
- Le Havre, France, 13 August 1918
- St. Maixent Replacement Barracks, France, 14 August 1918
- Romorantin Aerodrome, France, 20 August 1918
- Delouze Aerodrome, France, 26 August 1918
- Amanty Aerodrome, France, 6 September 1918
- Maulan Aerodrome, France, 24 September 1918
- Colombey-les-Belles Airdrome, France, 17 January 1919
- Guitres, France, 1 February 1919
- St Denis de Pile, France, 19 February 1919
- Sablons, France, 9 March 1919
- Libourne, France, 13 April 1919
- Bordeaux, France, 16–21 Apr 1919
- Camp Mills, New York, 1 May 1919
- Mitchel Field, New York, 2 May 1919
- Hazelhurst Field, New York, 5 May 1919
- Ellington Field, Texas, 26 May 1919
- Fort Bliss, Texas, 23 June 1919 (Flight operated from Marfa Field, Texas, c. Aug-c. 5 November 1919)
- Kelly Field, Texas, 8 November 1919
- Langley Field, Virginia, 30 June 1922
- March Field, California, 3 Jun-31 Jul 1927
- Rockwell Field, California, 1 June 1928
- March Field, California, 29 October 1931 (operated from Winslow Airport, Arizona, 17–21 Jan 1932)
- Hamilton Field, California, 5 December 1934
- Fort Douglas, Utah, 7 September 1940
- Salt Lake City Airport, Utah, c. 18 Jan-13 Nov 1941
- Archerfield Airport, Brisbane, Australia, 22 December 1941

Operated from: Muroc Army Airfield, California, 8-c. 12 December 1941
Operated from: Singosari Airfield, Java, 13–19 Jan 1942

- Jogjakarta Airfield, Java, 19 Jan-c. 1 March 1942
- Essendon Airport, Melbourne, Australia, c. 4 Mar-6 Apr 1942
- Columbia Army Air Base, South Carolina, c. 26 Apr-2 May 1942
- Karachi Airport, India, c. 20 May 1942
- Allahabad Airport, India, 27 May 1942
- Kunming Airport, China, 4 June 1942

Detachments operated from: Kweilin, Hengyang, and Nanning, 30 Jun – 20 Jul, 2–6 Aug, and 24 Oct-28 Nov 1942
Detachment operated from: Dinjan, India, 28 Jun-c. 24 October 1942
Detachment operated from: Karachi, India, c. May 1942-21 Jun 1943

- Kweilin Airfield, China, 21 June 1943

Detachments operated from: Hengyang, Suichwan, Nanning, and Lingling, Jun 1943 – Jun 1944

- Yang Tong Airfield, China, 28 June 1944

Detachments operated from: Kweilin and Liuchow, 28 Jun-1 Nov 1944

- Yangkai Airfield, China, 2 Nov 1944– c. Sep 1945

Detachment operated from: Laowhangpin, 28 Feb-c. Mar 1945
Detachment operated from: Chihkiang, 28 Mar-1 Apr 1945

- Camp Kilmer, New Jersey, 1–2 Nov 1945
- Orlando Air Force Base, Florida, 1 Sep 1954 – 21 Jun 1956
- Sembach Air Base, West Germany, 1 Jul 1956 – 18 Jun 1958
- RAF Greenham Common, England, 1 Oct 1982 – 31 May 1991
- Barksdale Air Force Base, Louisiana, 1 Jul 1994–Present

=== Aircraft and missiles ===
- Curtiss JN-4, 1917
- Standard J-1, 1917
- Dayton-Wright DH-4, 1918–1919; 1919–1927
- Martin MB-2 (1919–1927)
- Huff-Daland LB-1 (1926–1927)
- Keystone LB-7 (1929–1931)
- Douglas O-2 (1928–1931)
- Curtiss B-2 Condor (1931–1934)
- Keystone B-3 (1931–1934)
- Keystone B-4 (1931–1934)
- Keystone B-6 (1931–1934)
- Thomas-Morse O-19 (1931–1934)
- Douglas O-38 (1931–1934)
- Martin B-12 (1934–1936)
- Martin B-10 (1936–1937)
- Douglas B-18 Bolo (1937–1940)
- Boeing B-17 Flying Fortress (1939–1942)
- Consolidated LB-30 Liberator (1942)
- North American B-25 Mitchell (1942–1945)
- Douglas A-26 Invader (1945)
- Martin B-61 (later TM-61) Matador (1954–1958)
- BGM-109G Ground Launched Cruise Missile (1982–1991)
- Boeing B-52H Stratofortress (1994–present)

== See also ==
- List of American aero squadrons
- List of B-52 Units of the United States Air Force
- List of United States Air Force missile squadrons
- United States Army Air Forces in Australia
