= 491st Attack Squadron =

491st Attack Squadron

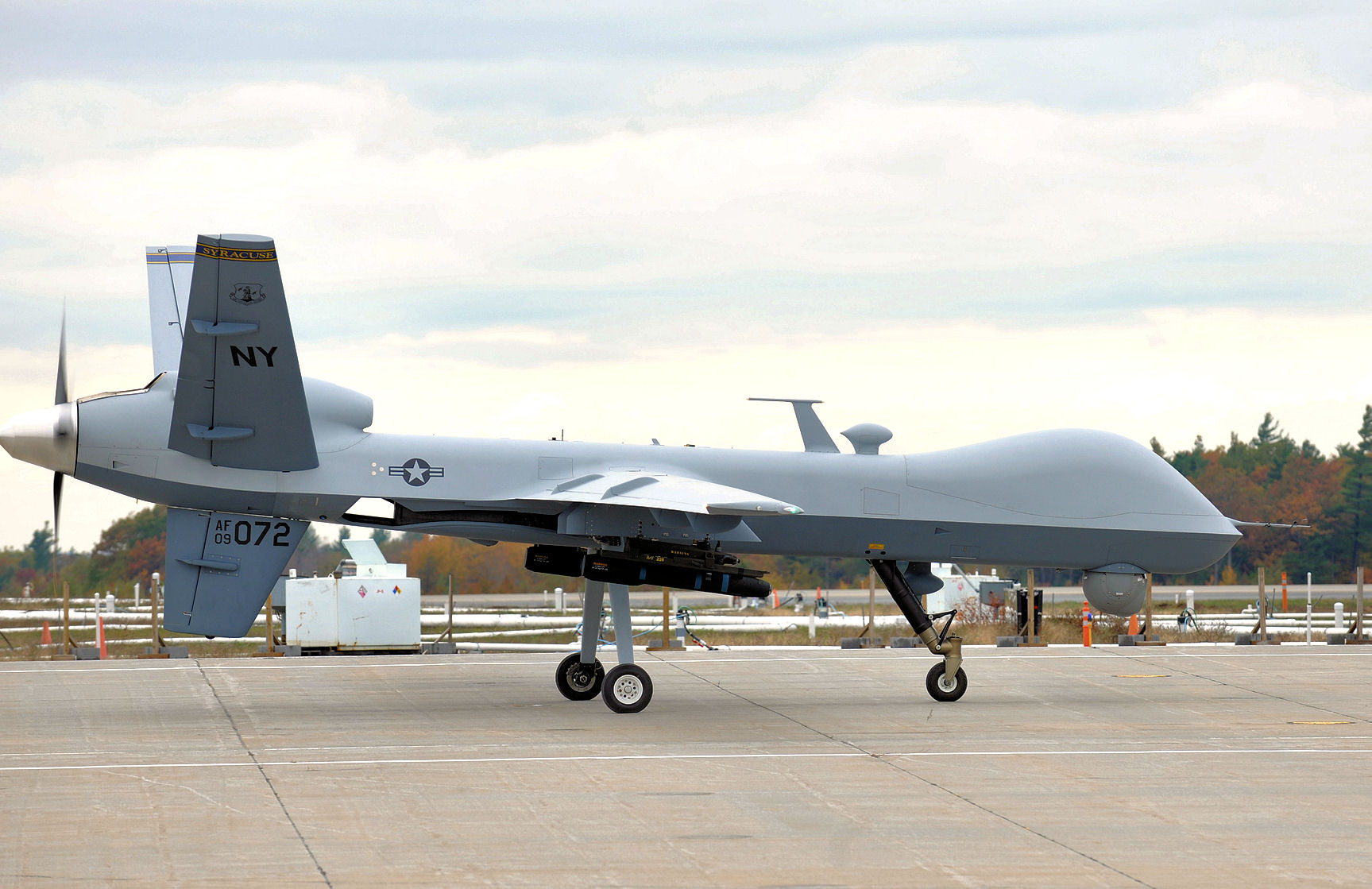
- MQ-9 Reaper at Hancock Field ANGB (Note: Aircraft is General Atomics MQ-9B Reaper, serial 09-4072 assigned to the 174th Attack Wing.)
- Active: 1917–1919; 1925–1937; 1942–1945; 1947–1949; 1958–1961; 2019–present
- Country: United States
- Branch: United States Air Force
- Role: attack training
- Part of: Air Education and Training Command
- Garrison/HQ: Hancock Field ANGB
- Nickname: Bomb Jockeys(1943) Ringers(1944-present)
- Engagements: World War I; China-Burma-India Theater
- Decorations: Distinguished Unit Citation; Air Force Outstanding Unit Award

Commanders
- Current commander: Lt Col Matthew Scardaci

Insignia
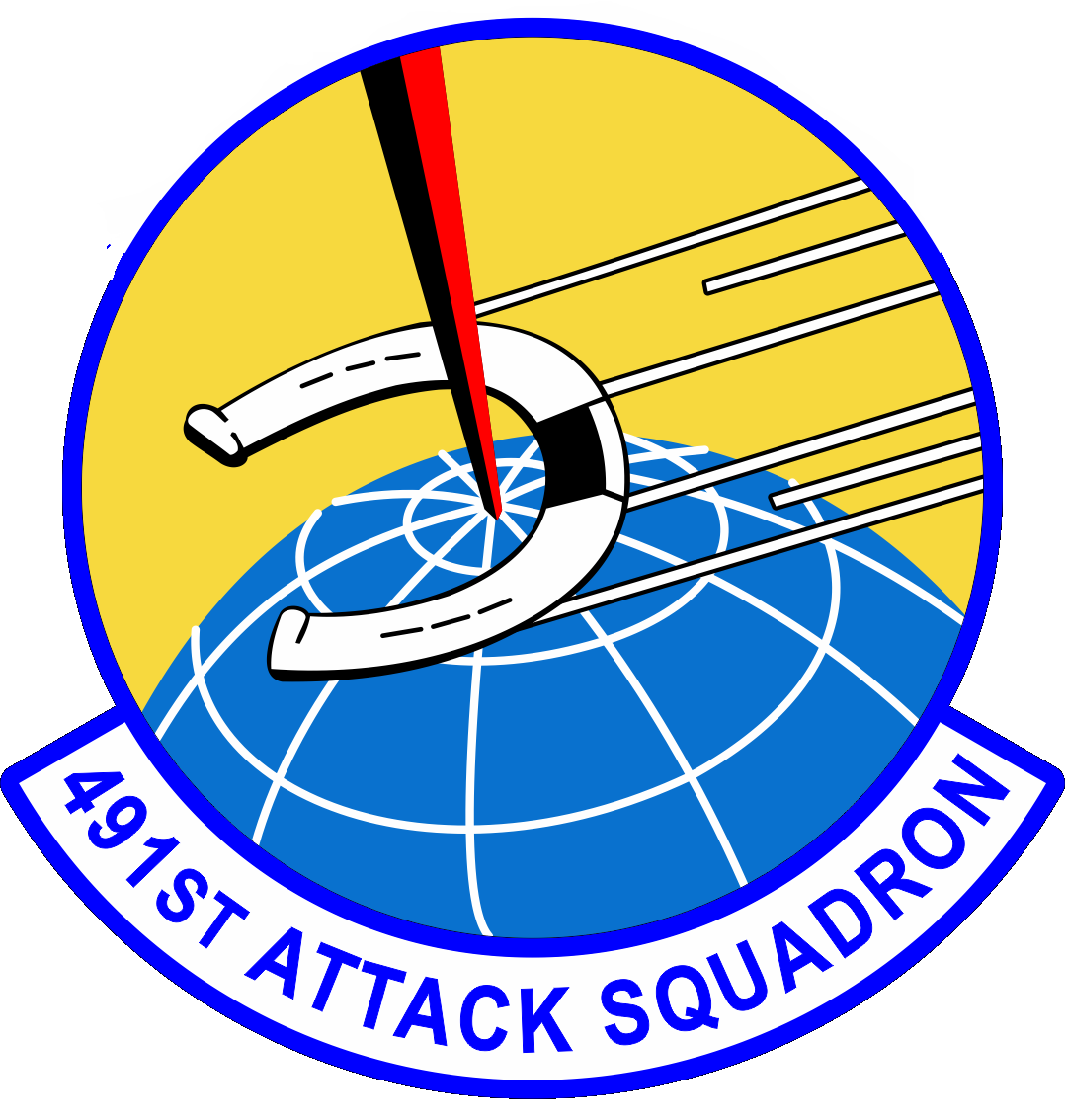
- 491st Attack Squadron emblem (Note: Approved 19 October 1944. Description: On a yellow disc, border black, a medium blue sphere in base, marked with white lines of latitude and longitude, and having a black and red stake affixed at pole, being rung by white horseshoe, trimmed black, leaving white speed lines to rear toward sinister chief.)

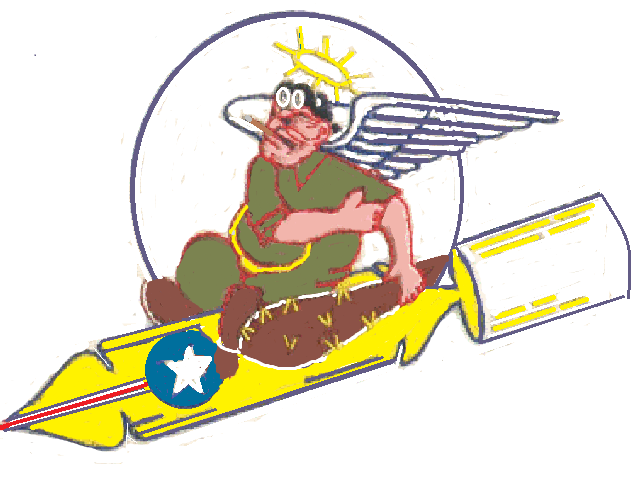
- First 491st Bombardment Squadron emblem (Note: This emblem was used in 1943, but apparently never received official approval. Watkins, pp. 90-91.)

The 491st Attack Squadron is an active United States Air Force regular associate unit, stationed at Hancock Field Air National Guard Base, where it was activated in April 2019. It is assigned to the 49th Wing at Holloman Air Force Base, New Mexico and operates General Atomics MQ-9 Reaper unmanned aerial vehicles.

The first predecessor of the squadron was organized during World War I as the 79th Aero Squadron. It deployed to France in 1917, where it was redesignated the 491st Aero Squadron. It served as a construction unit before returning to the United States, where it was demobilized in 1919.

The squadron's second predecessor is the 491st Bombardment Squadron, an Organized Reserve. It was activated in 1925 at Sand Point Airport, Washington, but was only nominally manned. The first two predecessor squadrons were consolidated in 1936, but the consolidated unit was inactivated the following year and was disbanded in May 1942.

The third predecessor of the unit is the 491st Bombardment Squadron (Medium), which was constituted and activated in India during World War II. It participated in combat in the China-Burma-India Theater until the end of the war, where it earned a Distinguished Unit Citation. Following V-J Day, it returned to the United States and was inactivated.

This squadron was activated in the reserve in 1947, but was discontinued when Continental Air Command reduced the number of its units due to reduced defense expenditures in 1949. In 1958, it was consolidated with the earlier squadrons and activated at Dyess Air Force Base, Texas when Strategic Air Command expanded its Boeing B-47 Stratojet wings to four squadrons. The squadron was inactivated at Dyess in 1961. In 2019, it was redesignated and activated with its current mission.

== Mission ==
The squadron, in association with the 108th Attack Squadron of the New York Air National Guard, trains aircrew for the General Atomics MQ-9 Reaper unmanned aerial vehicle, including operations, maintenance, support and medical personnel.

== History ==
=== World War I ===
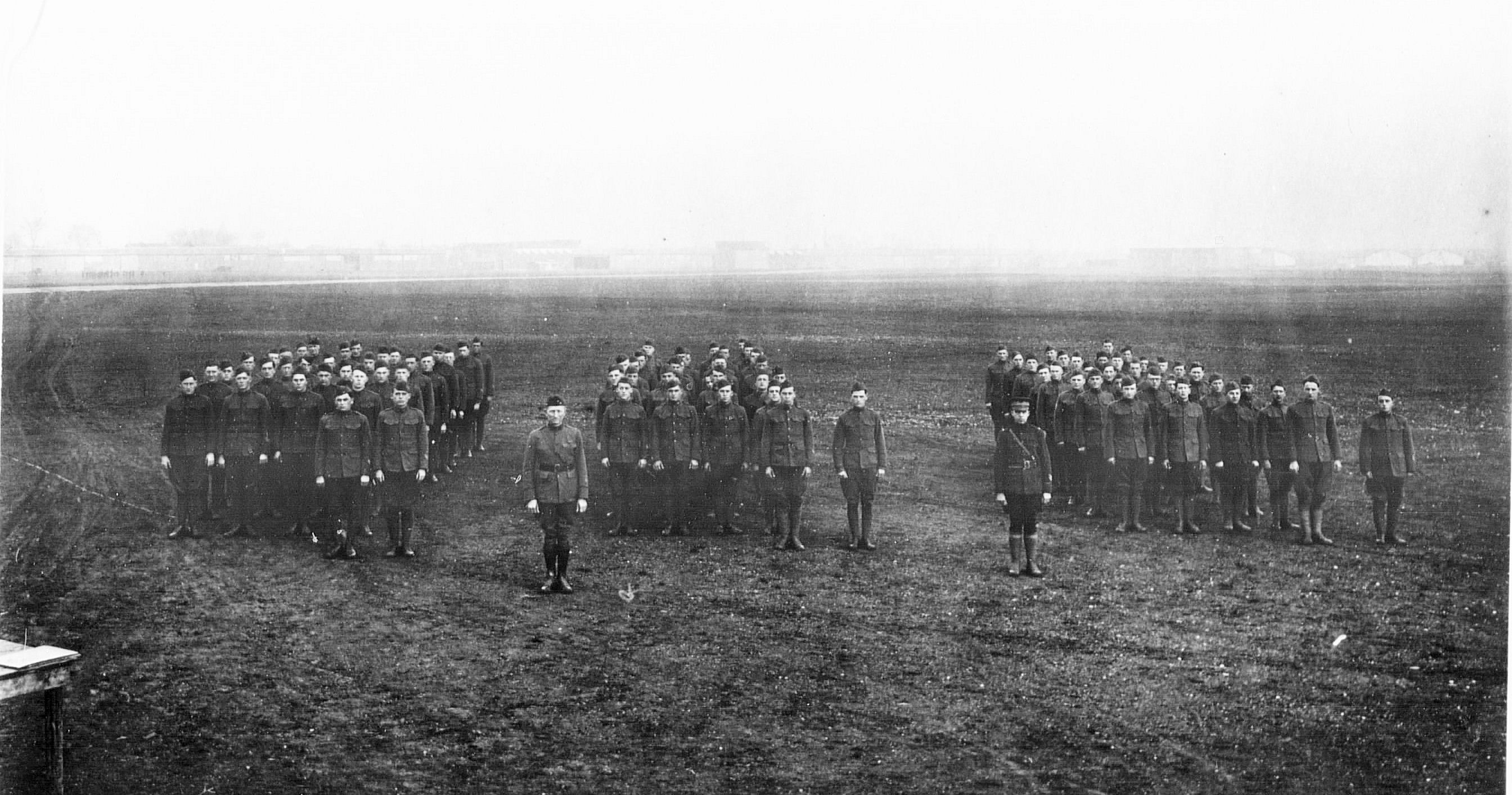
Members of the 491st Aero Squadron

The first predecessor of the squadron was organized as the 79th Aero Squadron at Kelly Field, Texas in August 1917. It deployed to the Aviation Concentration Center in Garden City, New York in November for shipment to France. It arrived in France the following month and moved to Aulnat, near Clermont-Ferrand, where it was redesignated the 491st Aero Squadron (Construction). The 491st constructed and maintained facilities from February until December 1918, when it moved to St. Nazaire to prepare for transfer back to the United States. It arrived in the United States in January 1919 and was demobilized at the end of the month. It was reconstituted in December 1936 and consolidated with the 491st Bombardment Squadron.

=== Organized Reserves ===
The first 491st Bombardment Squadron was authorized in the Organized Reserves in March 1924. It was organized at Sand Point Airport, Washington in the Ninth Corps Area the following January and assigned to the 349th Bombardment Group. The squadron was only nominally manned before it was inactivated in the spring of 1937. It was disbanded in May 1942. In August 1958 it was reconstituted and consolidated with the 491st Bombardment Squadron, Medium.

=== World War II ===
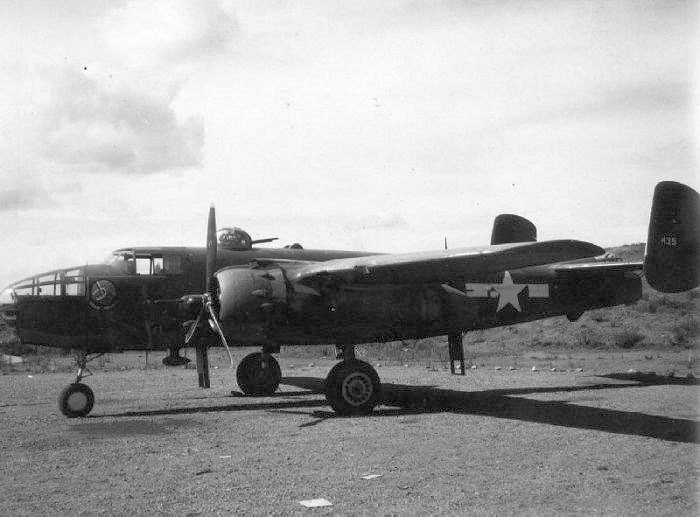
341st Bombardment Group B-25 Mitchell (Note: Aircraft is identified as North American B-25C-15 Mitchell, serial 42-32425.)

The second 491st Bombardment Squadron was activated at Camp Malir, India (now Pakistan) on 15 September 1942. The squadron drew its initial cadre from the 11th Bombardment Squadron. The 11th had been part of the 7th Bombardment Group, which had commanded a mixture of medium and heavy bombers in India. The 7th Group's two medium bomber squadrons were combined with the new 491st and 490th Bombardment Squadrons to form the 341st Bombardment Group, while the heavies remained with the 7th Group.

The squadron took some time to equip with North American B-25 Mitchells and was still without its own planes when India Air Task Force formed in October 1942, operating as an element of the 22nd Bombardment Squadron. The air echelon did not arrive at Chakulia Airfield, until January 1943. The squadron began combat operations at Chakulia, with the 341st Group flying its first mission on 10 January 1943.

The squadron flew missions against Japanese troop facilities throughout Burma and shipping in the Bay of Bengal. The 491st operated from Chakulia and from forward staging bases. In July and August 1943 a considerable part of the squadron's ground personnel served with a training unit of Air Transport Command at Gaya Airport, India, while the squadron managed to operate through the monsoon season with only a skeleton ground force.

Plans to move the squadron to China late in 1943 caused the 491st to cut back manning to between half and two-thirds of the personnel that a normal medium bomber squadron would have. Aircraft parts, gasoline and ammunition were given priority for space on Air Transport Command transports flying the Hump. Only a minimum number of men could be transported over the Himalayan range. Security and other support services were provided by Republic of China Army personnel once the squadron arrived at Yangkai Airfield, China in January 1944.

From February 1944 until V-J Day the squadron carried out missions over China, French Indochina, Thailand and Burma, flying some missions to targets as distant as New Guinea and the South China Sea. During 1944. squadron detachments also operated from Kweilin Airfield and Liuchow Airfield, China. The squadron also used a technique developed by the 490th Squadron, called "glip" (for glide-skip) bombing to attack bridges, particularly rail bridges in French Indochina. Its last combat mission was an attack on the Vinh, French Indochina (now Vietnam) railyards, although it later dropped leaflets near Liuchow, China.

In July 1945, squadron aircrews and maintenance personnel began transition training to the Douglas A-26 Invader at Fenny Airfield, India (now Bangla Desh). However, the war ended before the unit could convert to the new bomber, and they were ferried to A-26 units in Europe. The squadron remained in China until September 1945. It returned to the United States, where it was inactivated at Camp Kilmer, New Jersey, the Port of Embarkation, on 2 November 1945.

=== Air Force reserve ===
The squadron was reactivated in June 1947 as a reserve unit at Bradley Field, Connecticut, where it was assigned to the 341st Bombardment Group, located at Westover Field, Massachusetts. It was not equipped with operational aircraft, but flew North American AT-6 Texan and Beechcraft AT-11 Kansan trainer aircraft. Its training was supervised by the 108th AAF Base Unit (later 108th AF Base Unit, 2227th Air Force Reserve Training Center) of Air Defense Command (ADC). In July 1948 Continental Air Command assumed responsibility for managing reserve and Air National Guard units from ADC. President Truman's reduced 1949 defense budget required reductions in the number of units in the Air Force, and the 491st was inactivated in June 1949.

=== Strategic bomber operations ===
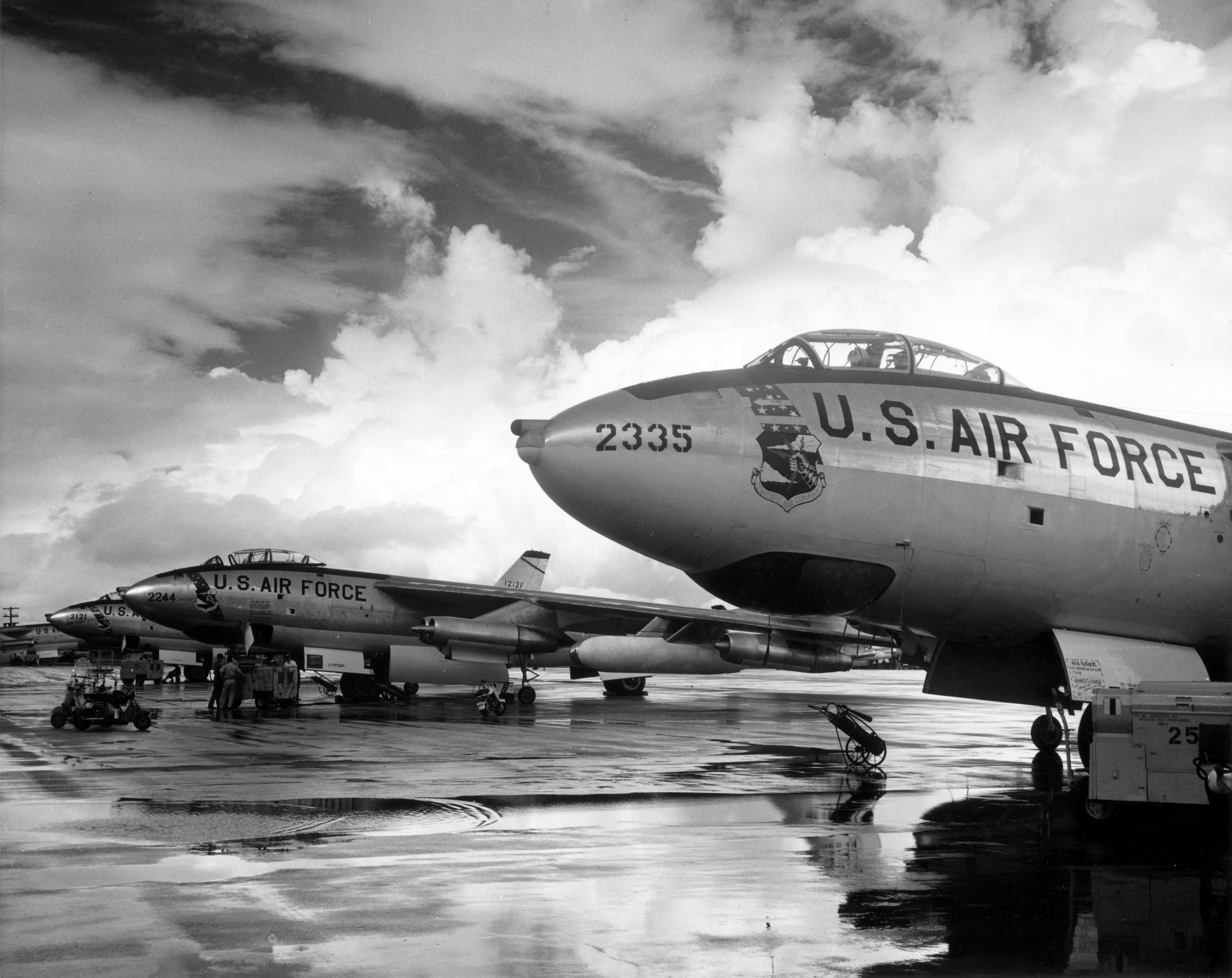
SAC B-47 Stratojets

Starting in 1958, Strategic Air Command's Boeing B-47 Stratojet wings of began to assume an alert posture at their home bases, reducing the amount of time spent on alert at overseas bases. The SAC alert cycle divided itself into four parts: planning, flying, alert and rest to meet General Thomas S. Power’s initial goal to maintain one third of SAC's planes on fifteen minute ground alert, fully fueled and ready for combat to reduce vulnerability to a Soviet missile strike. To implement this new system, B-47 wings reorganized from three to four squadrons.

The World War II squadron was consolidated with the first 491st Bombardment Squadron and activated on 1 November 1958 at Dyess Air Force Base as the fourth B-47 squadron of the 341st Bombardment Wing. The squadron trained in strategic bombardment operations with the B-47 and participated in SAC exercises and operations. In April 1961, the squadron began drawing down in preparation for inactivation and was inactivated on 25 June 1961, transferring its aircraft to other SAC wings.

=== Unmanned aerial vehicle operation ===
The squadron was redesignated the 491st Attack Squadron and activated at Hancock Field Air National Guard Base, New York in April 2019. Its administrative parent is the 49th Operations Group, located at Holloman Air Force Base, New Mexico, but it operates in association with the Air National Guard's 108th Attack Squadron. Its addition at Hancock permitted an increase in the number of MQ-9 crews trained there from 45 to up to 85 per year. The squadron' location at Hancock Field permits MQ-9 crews to train in harsher weather conditions and at a location where its operations need to be synchronized with civilian flights on the runway it shares with Syracuse Hancock International Airport.

== Lineage ==
491st Aero Squadron

- Organized as the 79th Aero Squadron on 15 August 1917

Redesignated 491st Aero Squadron (Construction) on 1 February 1918
Demobilized on 31 January 1919
Reconstituted and consolidated 5 December 1936 with the 491st Bombardment Squadron

491st Bombardment Squadron

- Constituted as the 491st Bombardment Squadron in the Organized Reserve on 31 March 1924

Activated in January 1925
Consolidated 5 December 1936 with the 491st Aero Squadron
Inactivated on 2 March 1937
Disbanded on 31 May 1942
Reconstituted and consolidated on 20 August 1958 with the 491st Bombardment Squadron, Medium

491st Attack Squadron

- Constituted as the 491st Bombardment Squadron (Medium) on 14 August 1942

Activated on 15 September 1942
Redesignated 491st Bombardment Squadron, Medium c. 1 August 1943
Inactivated on 2 November 1945
Redesignated 491st Bombardment Squadron, Light on 26 May 1947
Activated in the reserve on 5 June 1947
Inactivated on 27 June 1949
Redesignated 491st Bombardment Squadron, Medium on 20 August 1958 and consolidated with the 491st Bombardment Squadron
Activated on 1 November 1958
Discontinued and inactivated on 25 June 1961
Redesignated 491st Attack Squadron on 26 March 2019
Activated on 15 April 2019

=== Assignments ===
- Unknown, 15 August–December 1917 (Note: Probably Post Headquarters, Kelly Field to November 1917, then Garden City Aviation General Supply Depot & Concentration Camp.)
- Seventh Aviation Instruction Center, December 1917 – December 1918
- Unknown, December 1918 – 31 January 1919
- 349th Bombardment Group, January 1925 – 2 March 1937
- 341st Bombardment Group, 15 September 1942 – 2 November 1945
- 341st Bombardment Group, 5 June 1947 – 27 June 1949
- 341st Bombardment Wing, 1 November 1958 – 25 June 1961.
- 49th Operations Group, 15 April 2019 – present

=== Stations ===
- Kelly Field, Texas, 15 August 1917
- Garden City, New York, New York, 3–22 November 1917
- Aulnat, France, 18 December 1917
- St. Nazaire, France, c. 30 December 1918 – c. 12 January 1919
- Garden City, New York, c. 23–31 January 1919
- Sand Point Airport, Washington, January 1925 – 2 March 1937
- Camp Malir, India, 15 September 1942
- Chakulia Airfield, India, 5 January 1943 (detachment of ground personnel at Gaya, India, 20 July – 10 September 1943)
- Yangkai Airfield, China, 10 January 1944 – 13 September 1945 (detachments operated from Kweilin Airfield and Liuchow Airfield, China, 13 June – 10 July 1944 and from and Liuchow, 29 August – 2 November 1944)
- Camp Kilmer, New Jersey, 1 November 1945 – 2 November 1945
- Bradley Field, Connecticut, 5 June 1947 – 27 June 1949
- Dyess Air Force Base, Texas, 1 November 1958 – 25 June 1961
- Hancock Field Air National Guard Base, New York, 15 April 2019 – present

=== Aircraft ===
- North American B-25 Mitchell, 1942–1945
- Boeing B-47 Stratojet, 1958–1961

=== Awards and campaigns ===
Award streamer	Award	Dates	Notes
	Distinguished Unit Citation	11 December 1944–12 March 1945	491st Bombardment Squadron, French Indochina
	Air Force Outstanding Unit Award	1 July 2020–30 June 2022	491st Attack Squadron

Campaign Streamer	Campaign	Dates	Notes
	Theater of Operations	18 December 1917–c. 12 January 1919	491st Aero Squadron
	New Guinea	24 January 1943 – 31 December 1944	491st Bombardment Squadron
	India-Burma	2 April 1943 – 28 January 1945	491st Bombardment Squadron
	China Defensive	13 April 1945 – 4 May 1945	491st Bombardment Squadron
	China Offensive	5 May 1945 – 2 September 1945	491st Bombardment Squadron

== See also ==
- List of B-47 units of the United States Air Force
- List of American Aero Squadrons
