= 490th Missile Squadron =

US Air Force unit

490th Missile Squadron

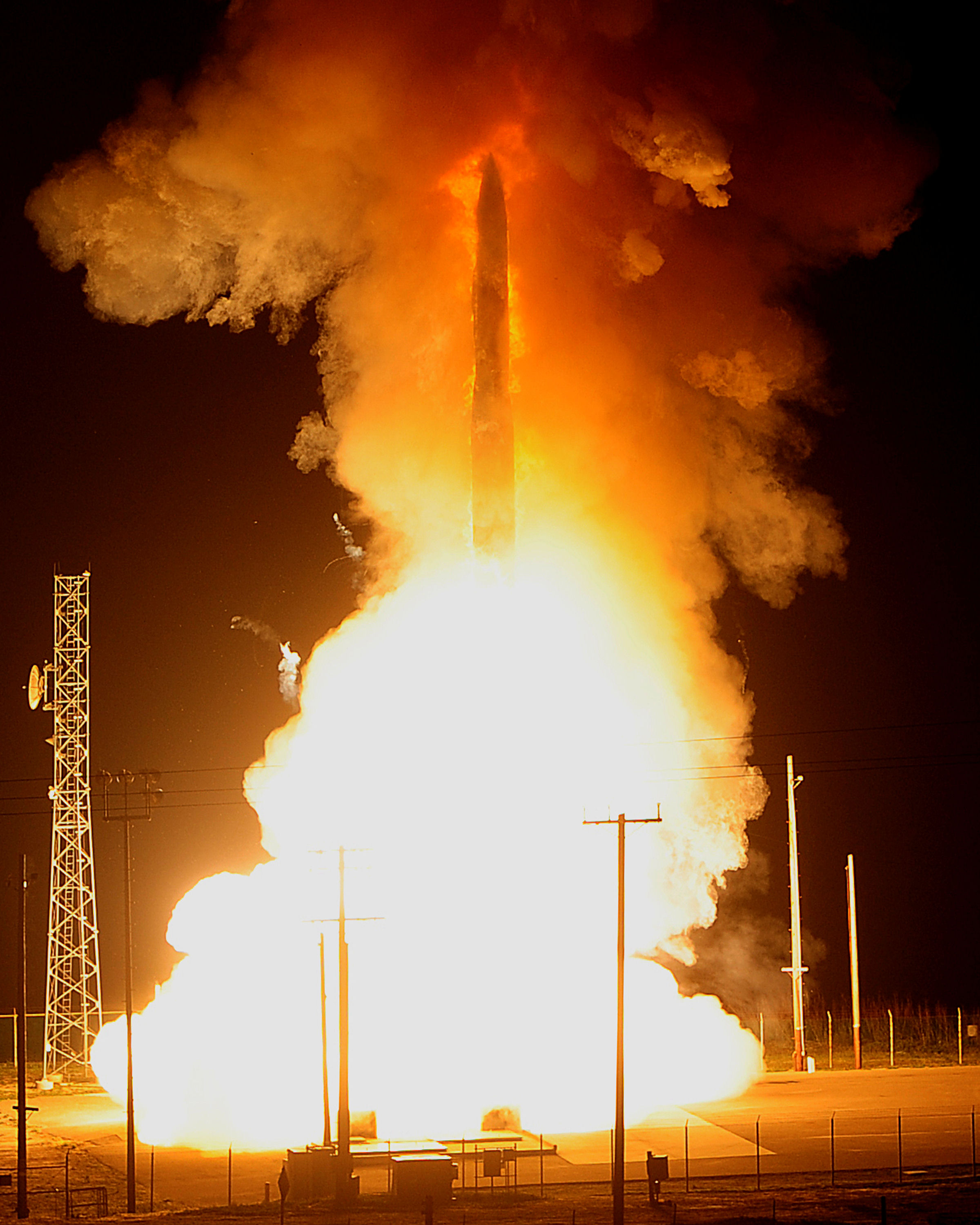
- LGM-30G Minuteman III test launch at Vandenberg AFB, California
- Active: 1942-1945; 1947-1949; 1955-1961; 1962-present
- Country: United States
- Branch: United States Air Force
- Type: Squadron
- Role: Intercontinental ballistic missile
- Part of: Air Force Global Strike Command
- Garrison/HQ: Malmstrom Air Force Base, Montana
- Nickname: Burma Bridge Busters (World War II)
- Engagements: China-Burma-India Theater
- Decorations: Distinguished Unit Citation; Air Force Outstanding Unit Award

Insignia
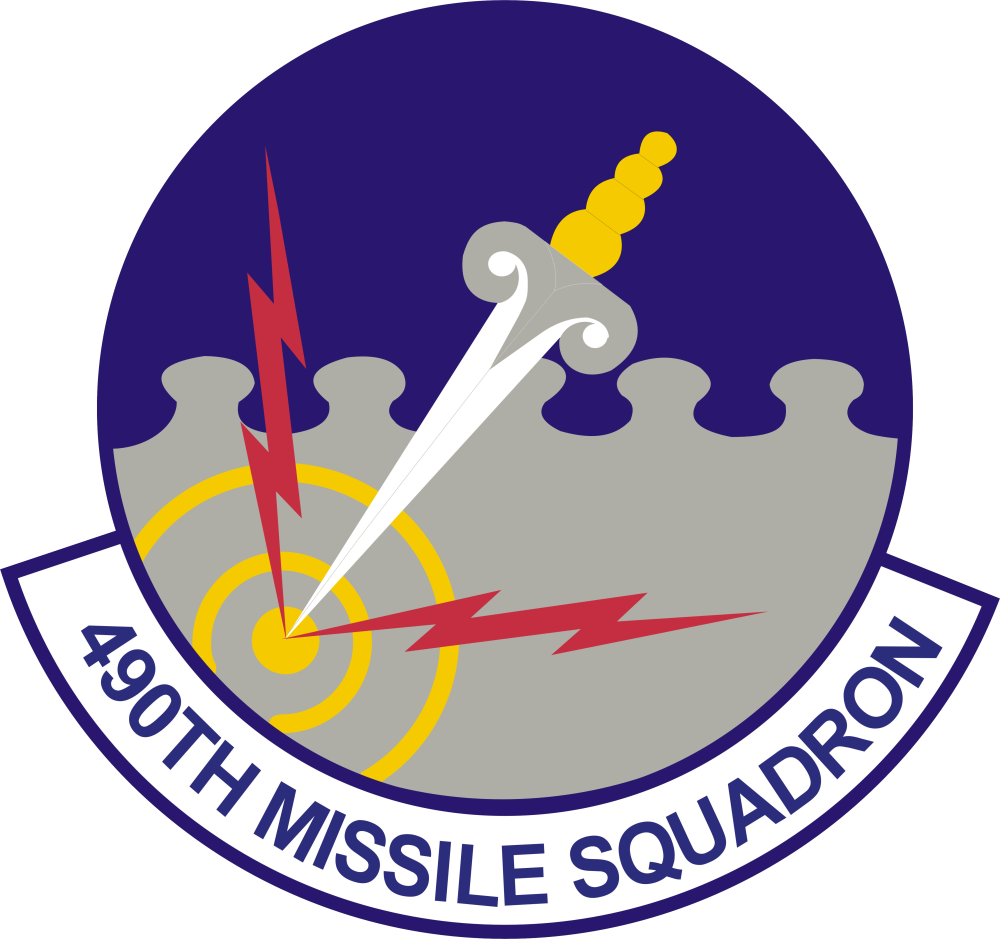
- 490th Missile Squadron emblem (Note: Approved 2 March 1995.)

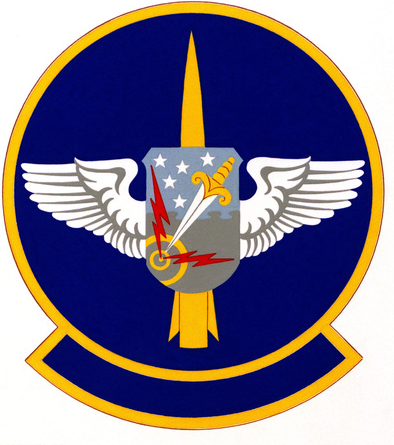
- 490th Strategic Missile Squadron emblem (Note: Approved 10 September 1985. Description: per fess nebuly Celeste and Silver Gray a target issuing from dexter base of the like [color] ringed or and from its center a sword imbedded argent hilt of the third [color] between also from target center a lightning bolt palewise and another fesswise Gules, all within a diminished border Azure.)

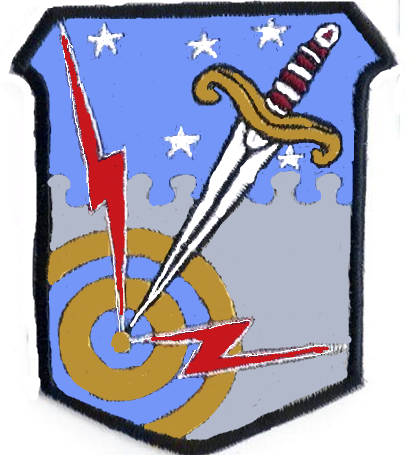
- 490th Bombardment Squadron emblem (Note: Approved 11 July 1956. Description: On a shield per fess nebuly azure and gray a target issuing from dexter base of the first [color] and or; the bull's eye pierced by a sword's point proper, hilt and pommel or, grip of the last [color] and gules, between two lightning bolts of the last [color], fimbriated argent; in chief, a semee of stars of the last [color].)

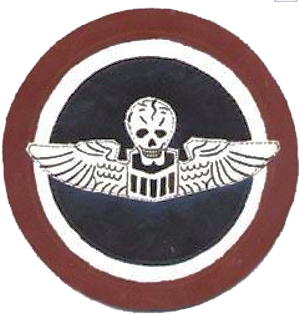
- Unofficial 490th Bombardment Squadron World War II emblem

The 490th Missile Squadron is an active United States Air Force unit. It is assigned to the 341st Operations Group at Malmstrom Air Force Base, Montana. The squadron is equipped with the LGM-30G Minuteman III intercontinental ballistic missile, with a mission of nuclear deterrence.

The squadron was first activated in the China-Burma-India Theater during World War II, earning a Distinguished Unit Citation for its operations in Burma. Following V-J Day, it returned to the United States, where it was inactivated. The squadron was activated in the reserves in April 1947, but was not equipped with operational aircraft before it was inactivated in 1949. It was activated again in 1955 as a Boeing B-47 Stratojet unit of Strategic Air Command until inactivating in 1961. The following year, it was organized with its current mission as the 490th Strategic Missile Squadron.

== Mission ==
The 490th Missile Squadron mission is to defend America with combat-ready airmen and intercontinental ballistic missiles. It maintains the capability to deliver long-range precision nuclear strikes within a moment's notice with LGM-30G Minuteman III missiles which provide the critical component of America's on-alert strategic forces.

== History ==
=== World War II ===
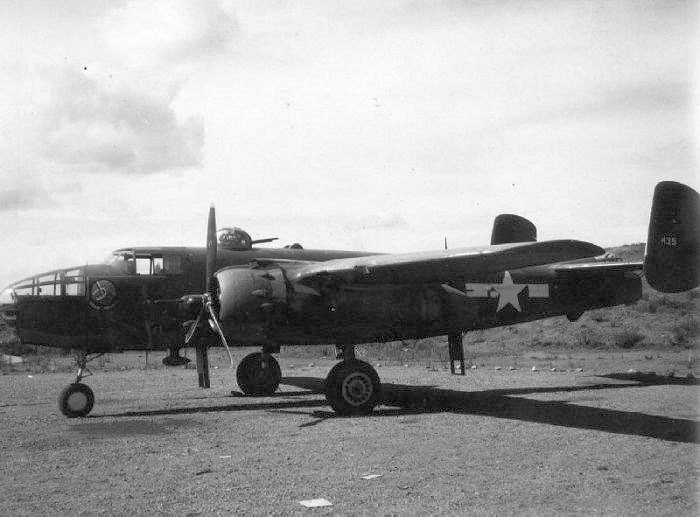
341st Bombardment Group B-25 Mitchell (Note: Aircraft is identified as North American B-25C-15 Mitchell, serial 42-32425.)

The 490th Bombardment Squadron was activated at Camp Malir, India (now Pakistan) on 15 September 1942. The squadron drew its initial cadre from the 11th Bombardment Squadron. The 11th had been part of the 7th Bombardment Group, which had commanded a mixture of medium and heavy bombers in India. The 7th Group's two medium bomber squadrons were combined with the new 490th and 491st Bombardment Squadrons to form the 341st Bombardment Group, while the heavies remained with the 7th Group.

The squadron received its complement of ground personnel in early December 1942, The ground echelon began to transfer by land to Ondal by road and rail in late December, arriving in January 1943. The squadron took some time to equip with North American B-25 Mitchells and was still without planes when India Air Task Force formed in October 1942 Its first Mitchell was not assigned until 19 November. The air echelon did not arrive at Ondal until February 1943, flying its first combat mission on 18 February.

The squadron concentrated on attacking enemy lines of communication in northern and central Burma to delay the movement of supplies for Japanese forces fighting in northern Burma. During early 1943, the squadron staged through Chittagong, India (now Bangla Desh) to conduct operations. The squadron moved to Kurmitola Airfield, India (now Bangla Desh) in May 1943. From its new base, it was able to operate without staging to forward locations. Interdiction concentrated on rail systems connecting Rangoon, Mandalay and Myitkyina, Burma. Realizing that the greatest damage to the rail system could be achieved by destruction of rolling stock and locomotives, the squadron's heaviest efforts were against rail centers and marshalling yards.

The squadron also attacked bridges, which were difficult to hit and even more difficult to destroy. Damage to bridges established choke points concentrating rolling stock, making bridges profitable targets. Experiments with tactics for destroying bridges initially provided little improvement in results. The squadron became the sole medium bomber unit conducting bridge attacks in Burma when, after the 311th Fighter-Bomber Group arrived in India, 341st Group headquarters, along with the 22d and 491st Squadrons moved to China to join its 11th Bombardment Squadron, already there. In October 1943, the 490th was reassigned directly to Tenth Air Force.

By early 1944, tactics developed by the 490th improved the accuracy of bridge attacks and the squadron was named the "Burma Bridge Busters. The technique developed by the 490th was "Glip" (for GLide-skIP) bombing and spread to the rest of the 341st Group. Using this tactic, unit B-25s would approach a bridge along the rail or road line in a slight dive, aiming just short of the bridge. The bomb was dropped just as the Mitchel pulled up from the dive. Its operations between October and December 1944 earned it a Distinguished Unit Citation.

The squadron interrupted combat operations and flew supplies from Chittagong to Allied Forces defending Imphal, India during a Japanese thrust into India between 20 May and 30 June 1944 before resuming combat operations. It assumed a secondary role of dropping leaflets over Burma for the United States Office of War Information from January to March 1945. (Note: Squadron members referred to these operations as the "Burma Mail", although they continued after the squadron moved to China. 490th Bombardment Squadron (M) "Burma Bridge Busters".) Starting in August 1944, the squadron moved forward from Kurmitola, and in November, left India for Burma. In April 1945, the squadron rejoined the 341st Group in China, moving to Hanchung Airfield, China. During most of its time in China the squadron maintained a detachment at Hsian Airfield, China, and its operations were controlled by the 312th Fighter Wing. The squadron engaged in attacks on trains, harbors, and railroads in French Indochina and the Canton and Hong Kong area of China.

Following V-J Day, the squadron remained in China until September 1945. It returned to the United States, where it was inactivated at Camp Kilmer, New Jersey, the Port of Embarkation, on 2 November 1945.

=== Air Force reserve ===
The squadron was reactivated in April 1947 as a reserve unit at Dow Field, Maine. Its parent was again the 341st Bombardment Group, which was located at Westover Field, Massachusetts. it was not equipped with operational aircraft, but flew North American AT-6 Texan and Beechcraft AT-11 Kansan trainer aircraft. Its training was supervised by the 109th AAF Base Unit (later 109th AF Base Unit, 2228th Air Force Reserve Training Center) of Air Defense Command (ADC). In 1948 Continental Air Command assumed responsibility for managing reserve and Air National Guard units from ADC. President Truman's reduced 1949 defense budget required reductions in the number of units in the Air Force, and the 490th was inactivated in June 1949.

=== Strategic Air Command bomber operations ===
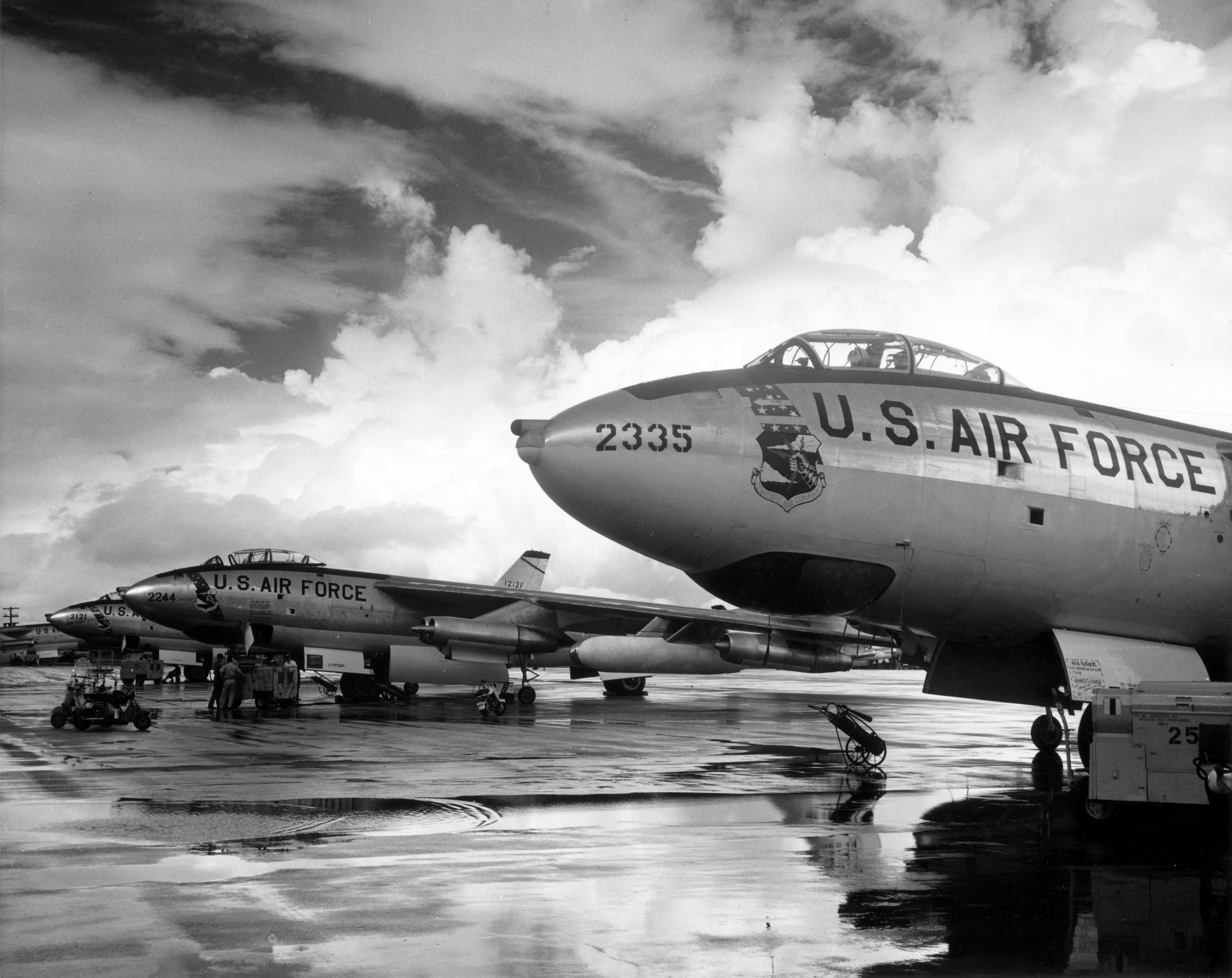
SAC B-47 Stratojets

The squadron was activated at Abilene Air Force Base, Texas on 1 September 1955, as the Air Force reopened it as a Strategic Air Command (SAC) base for Boeing B-47 Stratojet bombers. The squadron trained in strategic bombardment operations with the B-47 and participated in SAC exercises and operations. From January through April 1958, the squadron deployed with the 341st Bombardment Wing to Andersen Air Force Base, Guam. The squadron also participated in Operation Reflex alert operations. Reflex placed Stratojets and Boeing KC-97s at bases closer to the Soviet Union for 90 day periods, although individuals rotated back to home bases during unit Reflex deployments. Shortly thereafter, its planes went through Project Milk Bottle to strengthen their wings for low level operations.

Starting in 1958, SAC's B-47 wings of began to assume an alert posture at their home bases, reducing the amount of time spent on alert at overseas bases. General Thomas S. Power’s initial goal was to maintain one third of SAC's planes on fifteen minute ground alert, fully fueled and ready for combat to reduce vulnerability to a Soviet missile strike. Its last Reflex deployment ended on 15 July 1959. (Note: However, a later wing history indicated that the 341st Wing continued to deploy some B-47s to the United Kingdom as late as April 1960. No byline (1 April 1960). "Abstract, 341 Bombardment Wing Maintenance Analysis Report". Air Force History Index.) In April 1961, the squadron began drawing down in preparation for inactivation and was inactivated on 25 June 1961, transferring its aircraft to other SAC wings.

=== Intercontinental ballistic missile operations ===
In March 1960, the Secretary of Defense authorized the Air Force to establish initial operational capability with the LGM-30A Minuteman I by mid-1963, establishing a wing of three squadrons with 150 intercontinental ballistic missiles. Implementing this direction, construction of Minuteman operational facilities at Malmstrom Air Force Base, Montana began in March 1961. The squadron was redesignated the 490th Strategic Missile Squadron, organized at Malmstrom on 1 May 1962, and assigned to the 341st Strategic Missile Wing. The 490th was the third missile squadron to be activated at Malmstrom, and was the last LGM-30A equipped squadron to be activated. (Note: The next Minuteman wing to be activated, the 44th Strategic Missile Wing, was equipped with improved LGM-30B missiles. SAC Missile Chronology, p. 33.) By late September 1962, construction work on Minuteman launch facilities at Malmstrom was complete.

The 490th was organized into five flights, (Note: Flights were named consecutively within the wing, so the squadrons flights were K through O Flights.) with each flight controlling ten missiles. It became operational on 1 July 1963. In December 1963, SAC conducted the first operational readiness inspection of a Minuteman wing. the 490th was the first SAC squadron to successfully exercise all of its alert missiles during a readiness inspection.

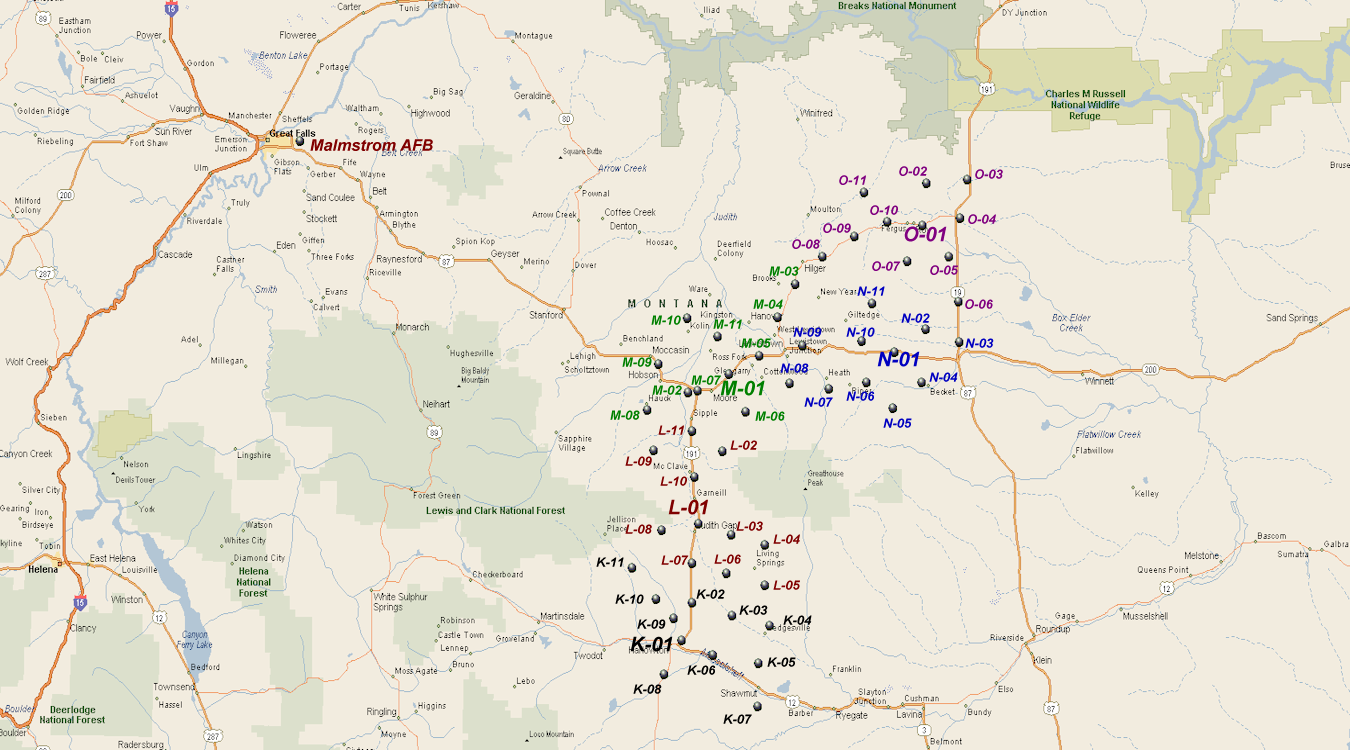
LGM-30 Minuteman Missile Alert and Launch Facilities

490th Missile Squadron Launch Facilities

Squadron Missile Alert Facilities were located as follows:

K-01 1.7 mi ENE of Harlowton, Montana: 46°26′43″N 109°48′05″W
L-01 1.3 mi NNE of Judith Gap, Montana: 46°41′40″N 109°44′27″W
M-01 4.1 mi NE of Moore, Montana: 47°00′49″N 109°37′51″W
N-01 11.0 mi WNW of Grass Range, Montana: 47°03′33″N 109°01′54″W
O-01 1.5 mi E of Roy, Montana: 47°19′43″N 108°55′37″W

The entire Minuteman I force was upgraded to the Minuteman II (LGM-30F), with modifications that required retrofitting all launch and launch control sites. The Minuteman II had a larger second stage engine and improved inertial guidance. It had greater range and payload than the Minuteman I, and had improved survivability in the event of a nuclear attack. In August 1964, the 341st Wing began a gradual upgrade of its LGM-30As to the LGM-30B that equipped the other Minuteman wings. However, it was not until February 1969 that the last LGM-30A was removed from its silo and by then conversion to the Minuteman II began. By May 1969, the squadron completed the "Force Modernization" upgrade and had converted to the Minuteman II. On 28 September 1991, President George H. W. Bush ordered that all Minuteman II missiles be taken off alert. It would take three and a half years before the last Minuteman II at Malmstrom was removed from the squadron's launch facility K-11 on 10 August 1995.

In 1996, the squadron began converting to the Minuteman III (LGM-30G). This model had an improved third stage booster, and was equipped with a multiple independently targetable reentry vehicle (MIRV) with three warheads as well as penetration aids to defend against antimissile systems. The squadron replaced its Minuteman IIs with Minuteman IIIs transferred from the inactivating 321st Strategic Missile Wing at Grand Forks Air Force Base, North Dakota. With the upgrade came an complete overhaul of the command and control system for the missile, called the Rapid Execution and Combat Targeting System.

Over the years, the squadron's Minuteman III missiles have undergone numerous upgrades to extend their service life, including replacement of the guidance system and remanufacture of their solid propellent motors. In addition, to comply with the New START treaty, MIRV systems were removed were replaced by single warhead reentry vehicles. The missile in squadron launch facility O-10 was the last Minuteman with MIRV.

== Popular culture ==
In 2003, the National D-Day Museum produced a documentary on the History Channel, about the 490th in World War II, titled "Burma Bridge Busters".

== Lineage ==
- Constituted as the 490th Bombardment Squadron (Medium) on 14 August 1942

Activated on 15 September 1942
Redesignated 490th Bombardment Squadron, Medium on 1 August 1943
Inactivated on 2 November 1945
Redesignated 490th Bombardment Squadron, Light on 11 March 1947
Activated in the reserve on 4 April 1947
Inactivated on 27 June 1949
Redesignated 490th Bombardment Squadron, Medium on 7 June 1955
Activated on 1 September 1955
Discontinued and inactivated on 25 June 1961
Redesignated 490th Strategic Missile Squadron (ICBM-Minuteman) and activated on 18 December 1961 (not organized)
Organized on 1 May 1962
Redesignated 490th Missile Squadron on 1 September 1991

=== Assignments ===
- 341st Bombardment Group, 15 September 1942
- Tenth Air Force, 25 October 1943 (attached to 341st Bombardment Group until c. 7 January 1944)
- 341st Bombardment Group, 7 May-2 November 1945 (attached to 312th Fighter Wing for operational control, 7 May until c. 25 Aug 1945)
- 341st Bombardment Group, 4 April 1947 – 27 June 1949
- 341st Bombardment Wing, 1 September 1955 – 25 June 1961
- Strategic Air Command, 18 December 1961 (not organized)
- 341st Strategic Missile Wing, 1 May 1962
- 341st Operations Group, 1 September 1991 – present

=== Stations ===
- Camp Malir, Karachi, India, 15 September 1942
- Ondal, India, 5 January 1943 (operated from Chakulia Airfield, India (now Bangla Desh), 20–25 May 1943)
- Kurmitola Airfield, India, 25 May 1943
- Dergaon, India, 26 August 1944
- Moran, India, 20 October 1944
- Warazup, Burma, 29 November 1944
- Hanchung Airfield, China, 13 April – 13 September 1945 (detachment operated from Hsian Airfield, China, 16 April – 4 August 1945)
- Camp Kilmer, New Jersey, 1–2 November 1945
- Dow Field (later Dow Air Force Base), Maine, 4 April 1947 – 27 June 1949
- Abilene Air Force Base (later Dyess Air Force Base), Texas, 1 September 1955 – 25 June 1961

Deployed to Andersen Air Force Base, Guam, 9 January – c. 3 April 1958

- Malmstrom Air Force Base, Montana, 1 May 1962 – present

=== Aircraft and missiles ===
- North American B-25 Mitchel, 1942 –1945
- North American AT-6 Texan, 1947–1949
- Beech AT-11 Kansan, 1947–1949
- Boeing B-47E Stratojet, 1956–1961
- Boeing SM-80 (later LGM-30A) Minuteman I, 1962–1969
- Boeing LGM-30F Minuteman II, 1969–1996
- Boeing LGM-30G Minuteman III, 1996–present

=== Awards and campaigns ===
Award streamer	Award	Dates	Notes
	Distinguished Unit Citation	1 October-31 December 1944	490th Bombardment Squadron, Central Burma
	Air Force Outstanding Unit Award	22 October 1962-31 December 1963	490th Strategic Missile Squadron
	Air Force Outstanding Unit Award	1 July 1975-30 June 1976	490th Strategic Missile Squadron
	Air Force Outstanding Unit Award	1 July 1979-30 June 1981	490th Strategic Missile Squadron
	Air Force Outstanding Unit Award	1 July 1988-30 June 1990	490th Strategic Missile Squadron
	Air Force Outstanding Unit Award	1 July 1990-30 June 1991	490th Strategic Missile Squadron
	Air Force Outstanding Unit Award	1 September 1991-31 August 1993	490th Missile Squadron
	Air Force Outstanding Unit Award	1 September 1993-31 August 1994	490th Missile Squadron
	Air Force Outstanding Unit Award	1 September 1994-31 August 1995	490th Missile Squadron
	Air Force Outstanding Unit Award	1 October 1995-30 September 1996	490th Missile Squadron
	Air Force Outstanding Unit Award	1 October 1997-30 September 1997	490th Missile Squadron
	Air Force Outstanding Unit Award	1 October 2000-30 September 2002	490th Missile Squadron
	Air Force Outstanding Unit Award	1 October 2002-30 September 2004	490th Missile Squadron
	Air Force Outstanding Unit Award	1 October 2004-30 September 2006	490th Missile Squadron
	Air Force Outstanding Unit Award	1 October 2006-30 September 2008	490th Missile Squadron
	Air Force Outstanding Unit Award	1 October 2008-30 September 2009	490th Missile Squadron
	Air Force Outstanding Unit Award	1 January 2010-31 December 2011	490th Missile Squadron

Campaign Streamer	Campaign	Dates	Notes
	India-Burma	2 April 1943 – 28 January 1945	490th Bombardment Squadron
	Central Burma	29 January 1945 – 13 April 1945	490th Bombardment Squadron
	China Defensive	13 April 1945 – 4 May 1945	490th Bombardment Squadron
	China Offensive	5 May 1945 – 2 September 1945	490th Bombardment Squadron

== See also ==
- List of United States Air Force missile squadrons
- List of B-47 units of the United States Air Force
