= 341st Missile Wing =

US Air Force unit

Coordinates: 47°30′17″N 111°11′14″W

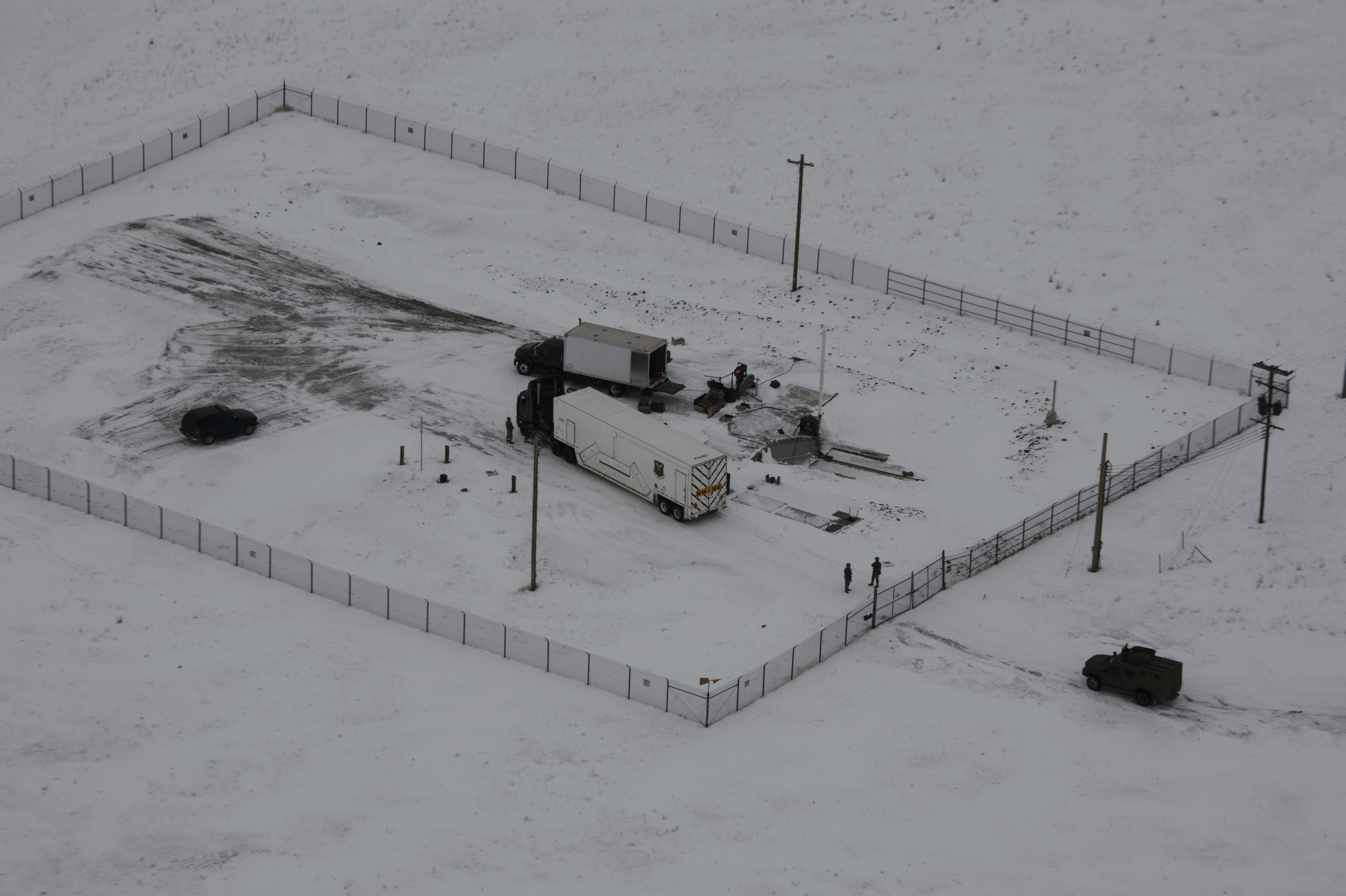
- Maintenance at a wing missile launch site
- Active: 1942–1945; 1946–1949; 1955–1961; 1961–present
- Role: intercontinental ballistic missile
- Part of: Air Force Global Strike Command
- Garrison/HQ: Malmstrom Air Force Base
- Motto: Pax Orbis per Arma Aeria (Latin for 'World Peace Through Air Strength')
- Engagements: Burma Campaign 1944-1945
- Decorations: Distinguished Unit Citation; Air Force Outstanding Unit Award

Insignia
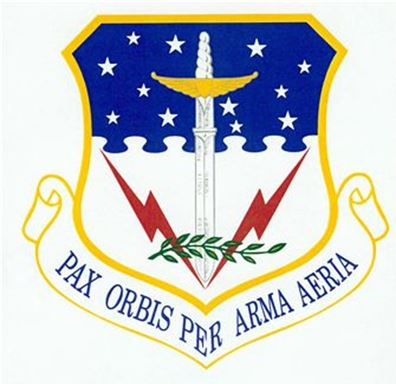
- 341st Missile Wing emblem (Note: Approved 22 March 1995.)

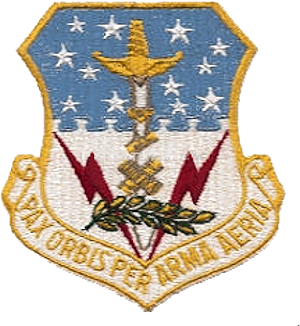
- Patch with 341st Bombardment Wing emblem (Note: Aapproved 5 June 1957.)

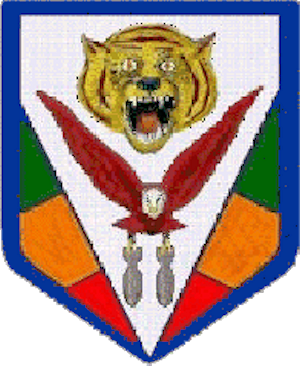
- 341st Bombardment Group emblem

The United States Air Force's 341st Missile Wing is an intercontinental ballistic missile unit headquartered at Malmstrom Air Force Base, Montana. Up until 1 July 2008, it was designated as the 341st Space Wing. Established as a World War II Tenth Air Force North American B-25 Mitchell bomb group in India, the unit served as part of Strategic Air Command during the early part of the Cold War as a Boeing B-47 Stratojet wing, before becoming an intercontinental ballistic missile unit in 1962. Today, the 341st is one of three remaining United States Air Force wings that maintain and operate the LGM-30 Minuteman III intercontinental ballistic missile. It is the oldest of the active Minuteman wings, first going on full strategic alert during the 1962 Cuban Missile Crisis.

== Mission ==
The 341st Missile Wing reports directly to Twentieth Air Force, F.E. Warren Air Force Base, Wyoming, and is part of Air Force Global Strike Command, headquartered at Barksdale Air Force Base, Louisiana. The mission of the 341st Missile Wing is to defend America with safe, secure, effective nuclear forces and combat-ready airmen.

== Subordinate units ==
The 341st Missile Wing is made up of a wing staff and five groups – the 341st Operations Group, 341st Maintenance Group, 341st Mission Support Group, 341st Security Forces Group and 341st Medical Group. The base is also host to two tenant units, the 819th RED HORSE Squadron and the 40th Helicopter Squadron (part of the 582d Helicopter Group).

- 341st Operations Group

10th Missile Squadron
12th Missile Squadron
490th Missile Squadron
341st Operations Support Squadron

The 564th Missile Squadron served with the wing from 1967–2008. The 341st Security Forces Group is the largest security forces group in the USAF. The units of the 341st Security Forces Group include the 341st Security Forces Squadron, 341st Missile Security Forces Squadron, 741st Missile Security Forces Squadron, 841st Missile Security Forces Squadron, and 341st Security Support Squadron.

== History ==
=== World War II ===
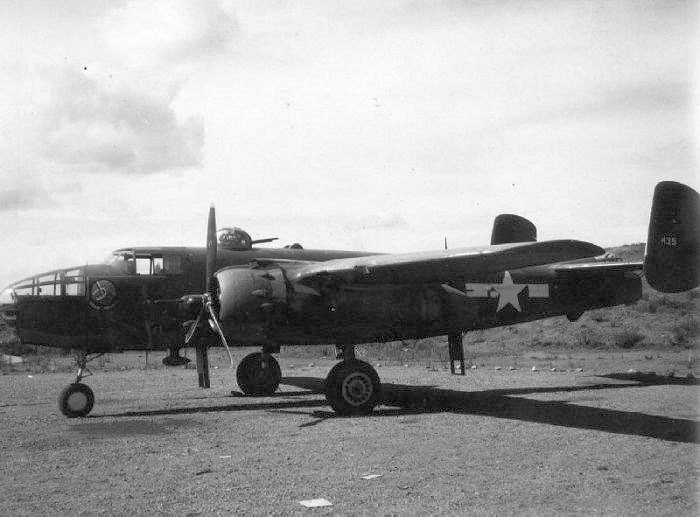
B-25J Mitchell, 341st #435, 491st Bomb Squadron, 1944

The 341st Missile Wing has its origins in the China-Burma-India Theater of World War II, being activated in India on 15 September 1942. The unit was one of the first bomber units in the CBI; being equipped with B-25 Mitchell medium bombers which were shipped from the United States to Karachi. The aircraft were readied for flight operations by Air Technical Service Command at Karachi Air Depot and dispatched to Chakulia Airfield, now in Bangladesh in December. The group was formed with two bomb squadrons (11th, 22d) which had been attached to the 7th Bombardment Group since May 1942, and two newly activated squadrons (490th and 491st Bombardment Squadrons). The 11th Bombardment Squadron was already in China, having flown combat missions with China Air Task Force since 1 July 1942. Planes and crews of the 22d Bombardment Squadron had been flying recon and tactical missions over north and central Burma, also since July.

The group entered combat early in 1943 and operated chiefly against enemy transportation in central Burma until 1944. It bombed bridges, locomotives, railroad yards, and other targets to delay movement of supplies to the Japanese troops fighting in northern Burma. The 341st Bomb Group usually functioned as if it were two groups and for a time as three. Soon after its activation in September 1942, 341st Bomb Group Headquarters and three of its squadrons, the 22d, 490th and 491st, were stationed and operating in India under direction of the Tenth Air Force, while the 11th Squadron was stationed and operating in China under direction of the "China Air Task Force", which was later reorganized and reinforced to become the Fourteenth Air Force. Fourteen months later the group headquarters along with 22d and the 491st Squadrons joined the 11th Squadron under the command of 69th Composite Wing, Fourteenth Air Force. 341st Group HQ was Kunming and the 22d and 491st were at Yangkai, while the 11th continued to be based at Kweilin, attached to the 68th Composite Wing. However, the 490th "Burma Bridge Busters" remained in India, under the command of Major-General Howard Davidson's Tenth Air Force. Still later the 11th Squadron and a detachment of the 491st operated for a time under the East China Task Force.

From several airfields in China the group engaged primarily in attacking enemy concentrations and storage areas and in conducting sea sweeps and attacks against inland shipping. They also bombed and strafed such targets as trains, harbors, and railroads in French Indochina and the Canton-Hong Kong area of China. Received a DUC for developing and using a special (glip) bombing technique against enemy bridges in French Indochina. It was inactivated on 2 November 1945, the day after Group and Squadron personnel debarked at Newark, New Jersey.

=== Bombardment Wing ===
Reactivated in September 1955 at Abilene Air Force Base (later Dyess Air Force Base), Texas as a Strategic Air Command Boeing B-47E Stratojet unit which were designed to carry nuclear weapons and to penetrate Soviet air defenses with its high operational ceiling and near supersonic speed. The 341st flew the B-47 in training missions and participated in various SAC exercises and deployments with the Stratojet to bases in Morocco and England designed for forward deployments. Also controlled a KC-97 Stratotanker squadron to provide air refueling for B-47 operations. In 1958 after the loss of some aircraft in clandestine Cold War operations; it was believed that Soviet air defenses had caught up to the ability of the B-47 to successfully penetrate Soviet airspace if called to combat duty. The Stratojet began to be phased out of the inventory and the 341st Bomb Wing began sending its aircraft to storage at Davis–Monthan AFB in 1961. The unit was inactivated on 25 June.

=== Strategic Missile Wing ===
On 15 July 1961 the 341st was reactivated as the 341st Strategic Missile Wing. A year later, in late July 1962, the first LGM-30A Minuteman I ICBM arrived at Malmstrom and was placed at Alpha-9 launch facility. The 10th Strategic Missile Squadron (SMS) accepted its final missile on 28 February 1963. Two months later, the 12th SMS became 100 percent combat ready. In July, the 490th SMS became fully operational, giving the 341st SMW responsibility for 150 silos. In August 1964, the Air Force announced plans to build an additional 50 silos assigned to the 341st to house LGM-30F Minuteman II missiles. As construction of these new silos proceeded through 1966, the 564th Strategic Missile Squadron stood up on 1 April 1966. Just over a year later America's 1,000th Minuteman missile would be in place and on alert at Malmstrom. This milestone marked the completion of Minuteman deployment by the United States. While new Minuteman IIs deployed with the 564th, upgrading of the Minuteman I models had been ongoing with the wing starting a transition from "A" to "B" models in August 1964. By June 1969, all Minuteman Is, both "A" and "B" models, were replaced by Minuteman II models. In 1975, the 564th SMS switched from the Minuteman II to the LGM-30G Minuteman III model.

In November 1975, the wing began an integrated improvement program that included a command data buffer and an improved launch control system. In 1985, the 341st SMW became the lead unit in the Minuteman Integrated Life Extension program (Rivet Mile). While serving as a deterrent force, the 341st SMW won numerous honors. The unit won its first Blanchard Trophy in SAC's annual Olympic Arena missile competition in 1976 and again captured this most coveted prize in 1986, 1990, and 1991. The unit has won additional accolades over the years. On 28 September 1991, President Bush ordered all Minuteman IIs off alert status. This order affected three-quarters of the 200 ICBMs assigned to the 341st SMW. On 1 September 1991 the 341st SMW was redesignated simply a Missile Wing, part of Strategic Air Command's Twentieth Air Force. As such it apparently became the only formation designated a 'Missile Wing' ever assigned to SAC. The 341st Missile Wing was reassigned from SAC to the Eighth Air Force of Air Combat Command on 31 May 1992.

In accordance with the Strategic Arms Reduction Treaty (START), on 28 September 1991, the 341st Missile Wing began taking its Minuteman IIs off alert and began deactivation of the missiles. 150 Minuteman II missiles were removed from their silos. Fifty of the vacated silos received Minuteman III missiles, joining the 50 Minuteman III missiles already on alert status. This conversion was completed by 1994. In March 1995, the Base Realignment and Closure (BRAC) Commission selected the 321st Strategic Missile Wing at Grand Forks Air Force Base, North Dakota for inactivation. The 321st Missile Group transferred control of its Minuteman III silos and alert responsibilities to the 341st Missile Wing on 30 September 1998. As a result of the 2005 Quadrennial Defense Review, the 341st Missile Wing deactivated the Minuteman III WS-133B missile system and subsequent inactivation of the 564th Missile Squadron on 19 August 2008. On 1 December 2009 it was reassigned to the new Air Force Global Strike Command where it remains on duty 24 hours a day, 7 days a week, every day of the year. On 19 April 2016, Col. Ronald G. Allen assumed command of the 341st Missile Wing from Col. Tom Wilcox.

==== Notable incidents ====
In November 2008, the wing failed its nuclear surety inspection, given by the Defense Threat Reduction Agency. The wing again failed the inspection on 9 February 2010. A July 2009 inspection conducted by the Air Force Audit Agency found that 48 percent of the 711 unused nuclear weapons-related materials handled by the wing were incorrectly tracked or recorded. The inspectors primarily faulted the Material Command, not the wing, for most of the discrepancies. In response to the findings, the wing moved all unused nuclear-related items to a secure storage area and performed a follow-up inventory which accounted for 100 percent of the items.

The 341st failed inspection again in August 2013. The wing received an "unsatisfactory" rating due to "tactical level errors" made during one of the many exercises during its inspection. In 2014 it was revealed that 34 nuclear missile officers of the wing had been implicated of cheating on their monthly missile launch officer tests. After an investigation, the wing's commander, Colonel Robert Stanley voluntarily resigned and retired from the Air Force. The commander and deputy commander of the operations group, and several subordinate commanders were relieved.

== Lineage ==
341st Bombardment Group

- Constituted as the 341st Bombardment Group (Medium) on 14 August 1942

Activated on 15 September 1942
Redesignated 341st Bombardment Group, Medium on 1 August 1943
Inactivated on 2 November 1945
Redesignated 341st Bombardment Group, Light and allotted to the reserve
Activated on 27 December 1946
Inactivated 27 June 1949
Consolidated with the 341st Strategic Missile Wing as the 341st Strategic Missile Wing on 31 January 1984

341st Missile Wing

- Constituted as the 341st Bombardment Wing, Medium on 23 March 1953

Activated on 1 September 1955
Discontinued and inactivated on 25 June 1961
Redesignated 341st Strategic Missile Wing (ICBM-Minuteman) and activated on 1 July 1961 (not organized)
Organized on 15 July 1961
Consolidated with the 341st Bombardment Group on 31 January 1984
Redesignated 341st Missile Wing on 1 September 1991
Redesignated 341st Space Wing on 1 October 1997
Redesignated 341st Missile Wing on 1 July 2008

=== Assignments ===
- 10th Air Force (later Tenth Air Force), 15 September 1942
- India Air Task Force, 3 October 1942
- Tenth Air Force, 16 October 1943
- Fourteenth Air Force, 25 October 1943 (attached to Tenth Air Force until 14 December 1943, then to Strategic Air Force)

69th Composite Wing, 26 December 1943 (remained attached to Strategic Air Force until c. 7 January 1944)

- XIV Air Force Tactical Air Command (Provisional), 21 June 1945 (attached to 69th Composite Wing)
- 69th Composite Wing, 1 August 1945
- Fourteenth Air Force, 25 August–September 1945
- First Air Force, 27 December 1946
- 3d Bombardment Wing (later 3d Air Division), 17 October 1947 – 27 June 1949.
- Fifteenth Air Force, 1 September 1955
- 819th Air Division, 1 February 1956 – 25 June 1961 (attached to 3d Air Division, 9 January-4 April 1958)
- Strategic Air Command, 1 July 1961 (not organized)
- 22d Air Division, 15 July 1961
- 821st Strategic Aerospace Division, 1 July 1962
- 813th Strategic Aerospace Division, 1 July 1964
- 18th Strategic Aerospace Division, 2 July 1966
- 810th Strategic Aerospace Division, 2 July 1968
- 4th Strategic Missile Division (later 4th Air Division), 30 June 1971
- 47th Air Division, 15 January 1973
- 4th Air Division, 23 January 1987
- Fifteenth Air Force, 23 August 1988
- 40th Air Division, 7 July 1989
- Fifteenth Air Force, 14 June 1991
- Twentieth Air Force, 1 September 1991
- Air Force Space Command, 1 July 1993
- Air Force Global Strike Command, 7 August 2009 – present

=== Operational Components ===
Group

- 341st Operations Group: 1 September 1991 – present

Squadrons

- 10th Bombardment Squadron (later 10th Strategic Missile Squadron): 18 June 1947 – 27 June 1949; 1 September 1955 – 25 June 1961; 1 December 1961 – 1 September 1991
- 11th Air Refueling Squadron: 1 December 1955 – 1 June 1960 (detached 19 December 1956 – 10 April 1957, 9 January-c. 4 April 1958, and 10 July-26 September 1958)
- 11th Bombardment Squadron: 15 September 1942 – 10 March 1943 (detached); 25 October 1943 – 2 November 1945 (detached until c. 6 January 1944, 13 March-c. December 1944, 16 March-1 August 1945)
- 12th Bombardment (later, 12th Strategic Missile) Squadron: 24 July 1947 – 27 June 1949; 1 September 1955 – 25 June 1961; 1 March 1962 – 1 September 1991
- 22d Bombardment Squadron: 15 September 1942 – 2 November 1945
- 490th Bombardment Squadron (later 490th Strategic Missile Squadron): assigned 15 September 1942 – 25 October 1943, attached 26 October 1943 – c. 7 January 1944; assigned 7 May-2 November 1945 (detached until c. 25 August 1945); 4 April 1947 – 27 June 1949; 1 September 1955 – 25 June 1961; 1 May 1962 – 1 September 1991
- 491st Bombardment Squadron: 15 September 1942 – 2 November 1945; 5 June 1947 – 27 June 1949; 1 November 1958 – 25 June 1961
- 564th Strategic Missile Squadron: 1 April 1966 – 1 September 1991

=== Stations ===
- Karachi Airport, Karachi, India 15 September – 30 December 1942
- Chakulia Airfield, India, 30 December 1942 – June 1943
- Kurmitola Airfield, India, June 1943 – 7 January 1944
- Kunming Airport, Kunming, China, 7 January 1944 – 13 December 1944
- Yangkai Airfield, China, 13 December 1944 – October 1945
- Camp Kilmer, New Jersey, 1–2 November 1945
- Westover Field, Massachusetts, 27 December 1946 – 27 June 1949.
- Abilene (Later Dyess AFB), Texas, 1 September 1955 – 25 June 1961
- Malmstrom AFB, Montana, 15 July 1961 – present

=== Aircraft and missiles ===
- B-25 Mitchell 1942–1945
- A-26 Invader 1945
- B-47E Stratojet 1956–1961
- KC-97 Stratofreighter 1956–1960
- LGM-30A Minuteman I 1962–1964
- LGM-30B Minuteman I 1964–1969
- LGM-30F Minuteman II 1966–1994
- LGM-30G Minuteman III 1975–present

== See also ==
- 341st Missile Wing LGM-30 Minuteman Missile Launch Sites
- List of B-47 units of the United States Air Force
