= Chakulia Airport =

Airport in Jharkhand, India

Chakulia Airfield
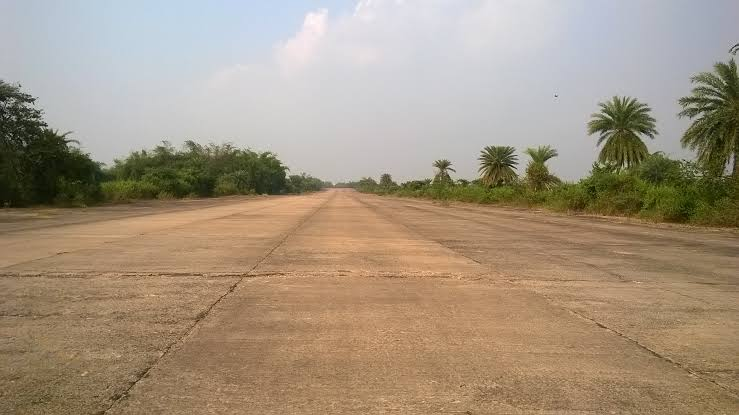
- IATA: none; ICAO: VECK

Summary
- Owner: Airports Authority of India (AAI)
- Serves: Jamshedpur, Kharagpur
- Location: Chakulia, Jharkhand
- Elevation AMSL: 129 m / 423 ft
- Coordinates: 22°28′00.49″N 086°42′38.52″E
- Website: Chakulia Airport

Map

Runways
Direction	Length		Surface
Direction	m	ft	Surface
17/35	2,085	6,840	Concrete
	2,221	7,287	Concrete

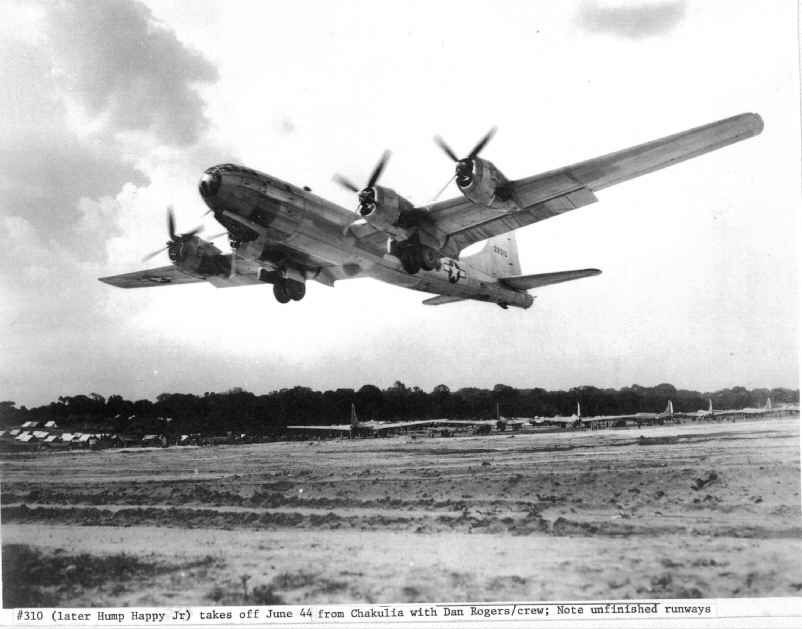
40th BG B-29 42-6310 taking off from Chakulia Airfield, India, June, 1944

Chakulia Airport is an airport in India. It is located southwest of Chakulia, a town and a notified area in Purbi Singhbhum district in the state of Jharkhand.

Currently, the airport has no scheduled commercial airline flights. In 2006, it was reported that the airport has been non-operational since it served during World War II.

== History ==
Chakulia Airfield was built by the British Construction Contractor Mr. Digar Pramotha Nath Mohanty by Das & Mohanty construction company in 1942 to conduct raids against the advancing Japanese in Burma and also for operations to transport aid to parts of China. It was originally designed for Consolidated B-24 Liberator use. It was initially assigned to United States Army Air Forces Tenth Air Force, with the 22nd Bombardment Squadron of 341st Bombardment Group arriving on 30 December 1942, equipped with B-25 Mitchells. Three of the Group's squadrons (22d, 491st Bombardment Squadron from Chakulia and 490th Bombardment Squadron from Kurmitola) flew missions from bases in India, chiefly against enemy transportation in central Burma. The group bombed bridges, locomotives, railroad yards, and other targets to delay movement of supplies to the Japanese troops fighting in northern Burma. The 341st Bombardment Group, and its 22nd and 491st Squadrons, transferred to 14th Air Force in December 1943 and moved to China in January 1944.

In addition, the 9th Photographic Reconnaissance Squadron, assigned to Headquarters, Tenth Air Force, flew F-4/F-5 (P-38) Lighting photo recon missions over Burma between 30 November 1942 – 3 January 1943. A detachment of the 118th Tactical Reconnaissance Squadron returned to the base, flying reconnaissance flights over Burma between March–June 1944

In December 1944, the 341st Bomb Group moved to China and the airfield was designated as a B-29 Superfortress Base for the planned deployment of the XX Bomber Command to India. Advance Army Air Forces echelons arrived in India in December 1943 to organize the upgrading of the airfield and thousands of Indians labored to upgrade the facility for Superfortress operations. It was one of four B-29 bases established by the Americans in India.

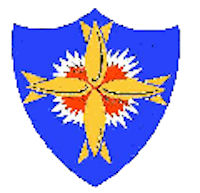
Emblem of the 40th Bombardment Group

Chakulia was designated to be the home of the 40th Bombardment Group, with initially five B-29 Squadrons (25th, 29th, 44th, 45th and 395th). The 40th arrived at the base on 2 April 1944 after completing B-29 transition training at Pratt AAF, Kansas. Support elements of the group included the 1st, 2d, 3d and 4th Bomb Maintenance Squadrons; the 11th Photo Lab, and the 28th Air Service Group.

It had taken nearly two weeks for the group to arrive at Chakulia from Kansas, deploying over the South Atlantic transport route. The deployment consisted of traveling to Morrison Field, Florida, then south through the Caribbean to Natal, Brazil. From Brazil the South Atlantic was crossed arriving in West Africa and re-assembling at Marrakesh, Morocco. The group then flew north and west from Morocco through Algeria and Egypt, before arriving at Karachi. By the time the group arrived at Chakulia, the month-long trip had taken its toll on the aircraft and personnel. Also, when the group arrived, the conditions at the base were poor, and the runways were still in the process of being lengthened when the first B-29s arrived.

In addition to the 40th, its command unit, the 58th Bombardment Wing temporarily took up residence at Chakulia on 2 April until its designated command base at Kalaikunda Airfield was ready. The 58th's headquarters was moved on 23d April.

Almost immediately upon arrival, the groups B-29s were grounded due to engine fires, which were caused by the engines not being designed to operate at ground temperatures higher than 115 degrees F, which were typically exceeded in India. Modifications had to be made to the engines and also to the cowl flaps. After these modifications, B-29 flights were resumed.

From India, the 40th Bomb Group planned to fly missions against Japan from airfields in China. Hsinching Airfield (A-1), located just to the southwest of Chengdu in south-central China was designated as the forward staging base for the group.

However, all the supplies of fuel, bombs, and spares needed to support operations from Kwanghan had to be flown 1,200 miles from India over "The Hump" (the name given by Allied pilots to the eastern end of the Himalayan Mountains), since Japanese control of the seas around the Chinese coast made seaborne supply of China impossible. Many of the supplies had to be delivered to China by the B-29s themselves. For this role, they were stripped of nearly all combat equipment and used as flying tankers and each carried seven tons of fuel for the six-hour (one way) flight, which itself was almost at the limit of the B-29's range. The Hump route was so dangerous and difficult that each time a B-29 flew from India to China it was counted as a combat mission. It took six round-trip flights by each Superfortress to Kwanghan in order to mount one combat mission from the forward base.

The first combat mission by the group took place on June 5, 1944, when squadrons of the 40th took off from India to attack the Makasan railroad yards at Bangkok, Thailand. This involved a 2261-mile round trip, the longest bombing mission yet attempted during the war.

On June 15 the group participated in the first American Air Force attack on the Japanese Home Islands since the Doolittle Raid in 1942. Operating from bases in India, and at times staging through fields in China, the group struck such targets as transportation centers, naval installations, iron works, and aircraft plants in Burma, Thailand, China, Japan, Indonesia, and Formosa, receiving a Distinguished Unit Citation for bombing iron and steel works at Yawata, Japan, on August 20, 1944. From a staging field in Ceylon, the 40th mined waters near the port of Palembang, Sumatra, in August 1944.

The 40th evacuated staging fields in China in January 1945 due to the Japanese offensive in South China which threatened the forward staging bases, but continued operations from India, bombing targets in Thailand and mining waters around Singapore. However, by late 1944 it was becoming apparent that B-29 operations against Japan staged out of the bases in Chengtu were far too expensive in men and materials and would have to be stopped. In December 1944, the Joint Chiefs of Staff made the decision that Operation Matterhorn would be phased out, and the B-29s would be moved to newly captured bases in the Marianas in the central Pacific.

On 25 February 1945, the 40th Bombardment Group flew south to Ceylon, then southeast across the Indian Ocean to Perth in Western Australia. Flying north through New Guinea, it reached its new home at West Field, Tinian, in the Mariana Islands on 4 April where it and its parent 58th Bombardment Wing came under the command of the new XXI Bomber Command.

With the departure of the B-29s in March 1945 to the Marianas, Chakulia Airfield was returned to Tenth Air Force. It was kept, however, largely in reserve status, with the 28th Service Group performing caretaker activities, with the occasional aircraft transiting the airfield.

With the last Americans leaving in late 1945, the airfield was turned over to the British colonial government. The postwar history of the airfield is unclear, however it is used today as a civil airport. The large, sprawling wartime airfield is largely in disrepair, with abandoned hardstands and taxiways visible on aerial images.

== See also ==
- Operation Matterhorn
