= Marfa Airport (original) =

Marfa Airport Marfa Auxiliary Army Airfield #7
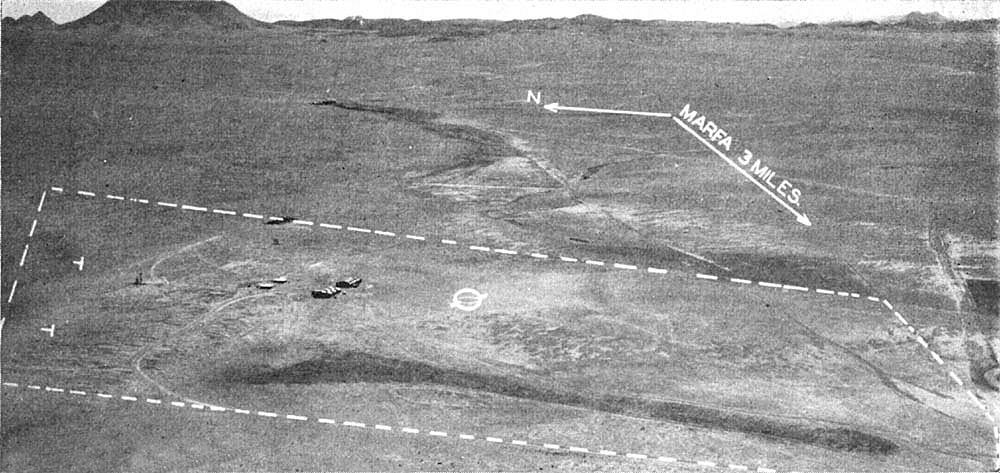
- Marfa Airport, Texas, 1938
- IATA: none; ICAO: none

Summary
- Built: 1919
- In use: 1919-1945
- Coordinates: 30°19′24″N 103°59′33″W

Map
- Marfa Airport, Texas Marfa Airport (the United States)

Runways
Direction	Length		Surface
Direction	ft	m	Surface
	4,788	1,459	Turf
	4,400	1,341	Turf
	4,400	1,341	Turf
- Runway information from: Texas World War II Airfields Database

Marfa Airport is a former airport, located 2 miles Northeast of Marfa, Texas. Airport operations ended in 1945.

== History ==
The airport was established by the Air Service, United States Army in 1919 as part of a series of military airfields along the Texas/Mexico border. Assigned to the Army Surveillance Group (ASG) Marfa Airfield was used to carry out observation overflights along the Mexican Border. During this period, Mexico was enduring a period of revolution and unrest, which led to border violations and the deaths of American citizens.

The 104th Surveillance Squadron operated Dayton-Wright DH-4 reconnaissance aircraft from Marfa Field beginning in November 1919. As the unrest in Mexico died down by the middle of 1921, the 104th moved back to Kelly Field, Texas in July.

The next use of the airfield was when the Department of Commerce refitted the facility as one of its network of Intermediate Landing Fields, which were established in the 1920s & 1930s to serve as emergency landing fields along commercial airways between major cities. It was also used by the City of Marfa as their municipal airport. However, the Marfa Municipal Airport continued to be used by the Army Air Corps on an as-needed basis until the beginning of World War II.

Marfa Army Air Field, 1943 classbook

At some point after the establishment of the much larger Marfa Army Airfield in 1942, Marfa Municipal Airport was taken over by the Army Air Forces and was designated as Marfa Auxiliary Airfield #7. Three paved 5,000' runways were laid down, and it supported the training mission of Marfa AAF and was frequently used by Cessna AT-17 Bobcat twin engine trainers and B-25 Mitchell Medium Bombers. At the end of the war, Marfa AAF and all of its auxiliary airfields were closed, and turned over to the War Assets Administration in 1947 for disposition.

The City of Marfa, however, chose to re-establish their municipal airport at the larger Marfa AAF, and the pre-war Marfa Municipal Airport was never used again as an airport. The land was sold and the property eventually was re-used as a Country Club. There are no remains of the former military airfield and civil airport.

== See also ==
- Texas World War II Army Airfields
