= Yangkai Airfield =

Former military airfield

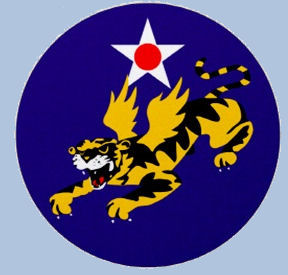
Yangkai Airfield
- Part of Fourteenth Air Force
- Yangjiacun, China

Site information
- Type: Military airfield
- Controlled by: United States Army Air Forces

Location
- Coordinates: 25°24′14.9″N 103°06′46.12″E

Site history
- In use: 1944-1945
- Battles/wars: China Defensive Campaign 1942-1945

Yangkai Airfield (羊街机场) is a former World War II United States Army Air Forces airfield in China. Its location was then 4 kilometres (2.5 miles) south of Yangjiezhen (羊街镇), Xundian County; after administrative changes, it is now at Longyuan village (龙院村), Songming County.

== History ==
The airfield, located approximately 33 miles northeast of Kunming, was the home of the B-24 Liberators of 373rd Bombardment Squadron (308th Bombardment Group), from 20 Mar 43 to Sep 44, when it moved to Luliang, China. The 373rd participated in attacks on airfields, coalyards, docks and warehouses, oil refineries and fuel dumps; as well as attacking shipping in the East and South Seas, the Formosa Strait and the Gulf of Tonkin.

The B-25 Mitchell-equipped 341st Bombardment Group, was based at Yangkai from Jan 1944 to Sep 1945. Units of the 341st (11th Bombardment Squadron, 22nd Bombardment Squadron, 491st Bombardment Squadron) flew missions from Yangkai, Kweilin (Guilin) and Liuchow (Liuzhou) against targets in Japanese-occupied China, Burma, Thailand and French Indochina. Primarily targets were Japanese river shipping, road convoys, airfields and other targets of opportunity, as well as sea sweeps over the offshore shipping lanes following the China coast and also attacked Japanese targets on Hainan Island. The Group's crews became quite proficient at destroying bridges in using their variation on 'Skip' and 'Glide' bombing. The 11th and 22nd had converted to A-26 Invaders for their final missions from Yangkai in late July and early August 1945.

Yangkai was also used by Air Transport Command as a supply hub in South China and also as a terminal for air shipments (Station 14, India, China Wing) from India over "the Hump". The Americans closed their facilities at the airfield in early 1946.
