= 22nd Expeditionary Air Refueling Squadron =

US Air Force unit

22d Expeditionary Air Refueling Squadron
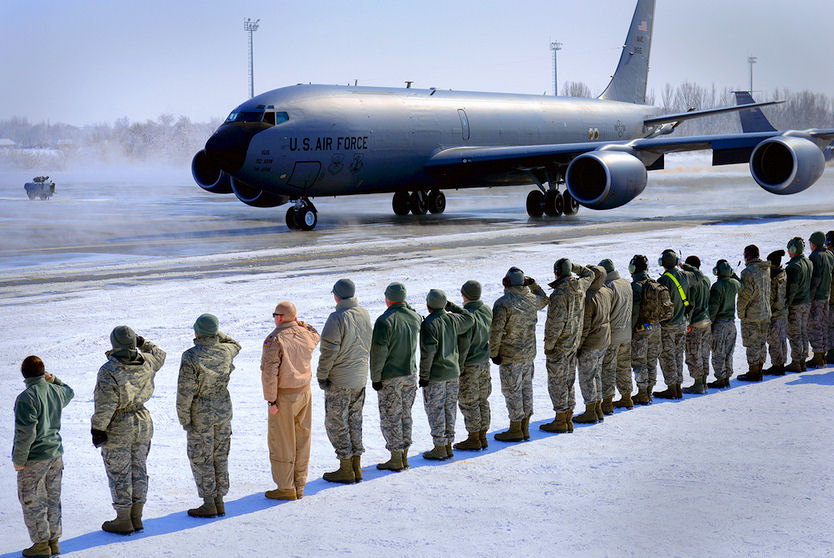
- 376th Expeditionary Operations Group KC-135 at Manas (Note: This aircraft, deployed from MacDill Air Force Base flew the last air refueling mission from the Manas Transit Center.)
- Active: 1939–1945; 1950–1962; 1963–1989; 1992–2002; 2003–by 2014
- Country: United States
- Branch: United States Air Force
- Role: Aerial refueling
- Nickname: Mules
- Engagements: South West Pacific Theater of World War II; China Burma India Theater of World War II; War in Afghanistan
- Decorations: Distinguished Unit Citation; Air Force Outstanding Unit Award

Insignia
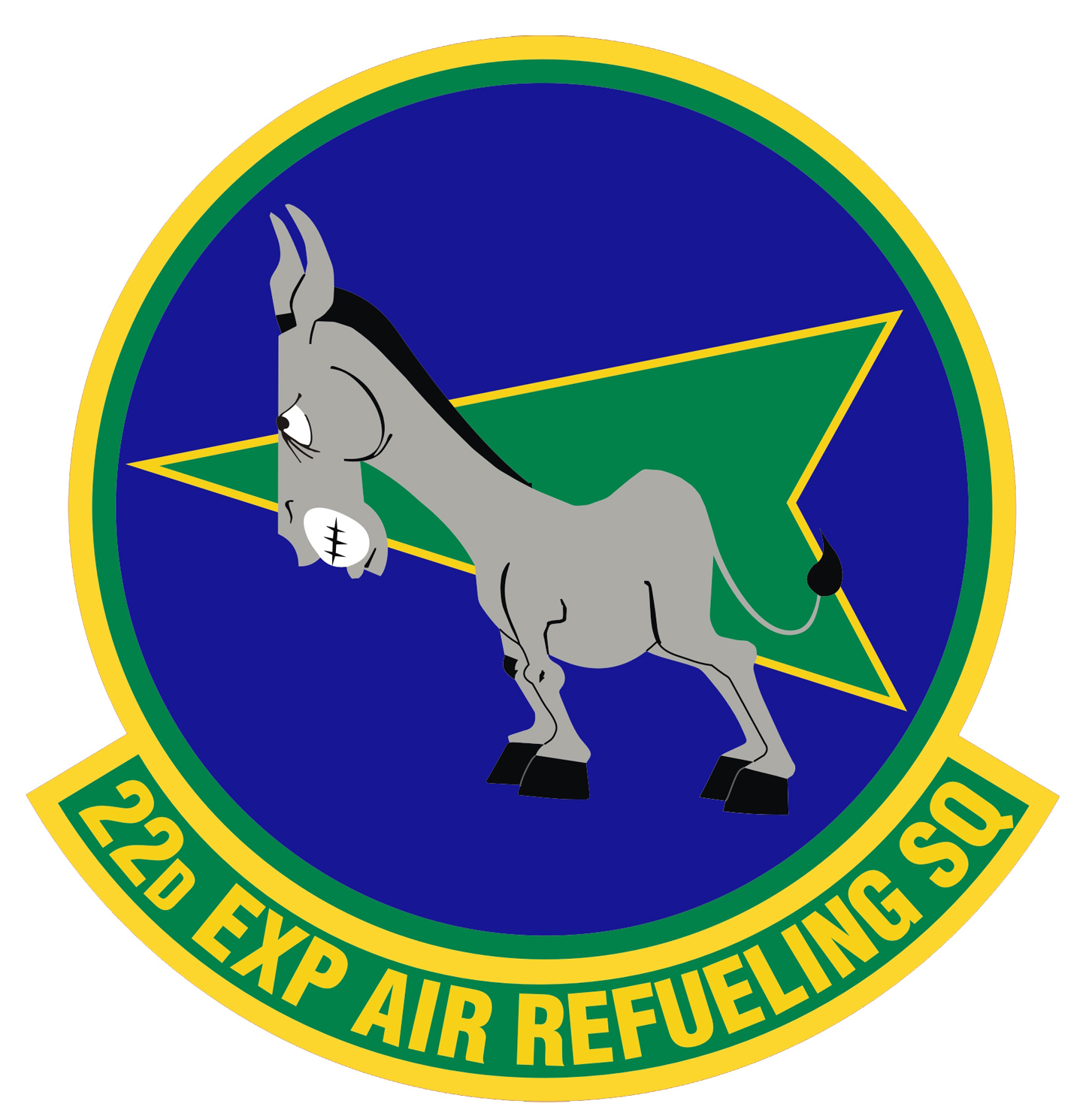
- 22d Expeditionary Air Refueling Squadron emblem (Note: Approved 15 November 1994. Description: Azure, a flight symbol fesswise throughout Vert, fimbriated Or, surmounted by a mule Proper all within a diminished inner bordure of the second [color] and a diminished outer bordure of the third [color])

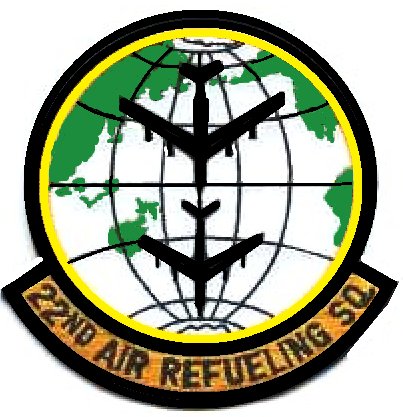
- 22d Air Refueling Squadron emblem (Note: Approved 13 December 1960. See Endicott, p. 487. (approval date).)

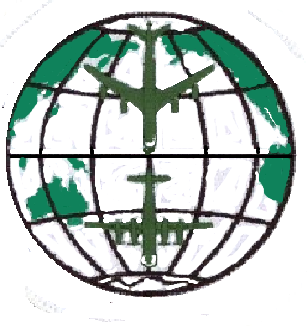
- 22d Air Refueling Squadron emblem (Note: >Approved 27 September 1955. See Endicott, p. 487. (approval date).)

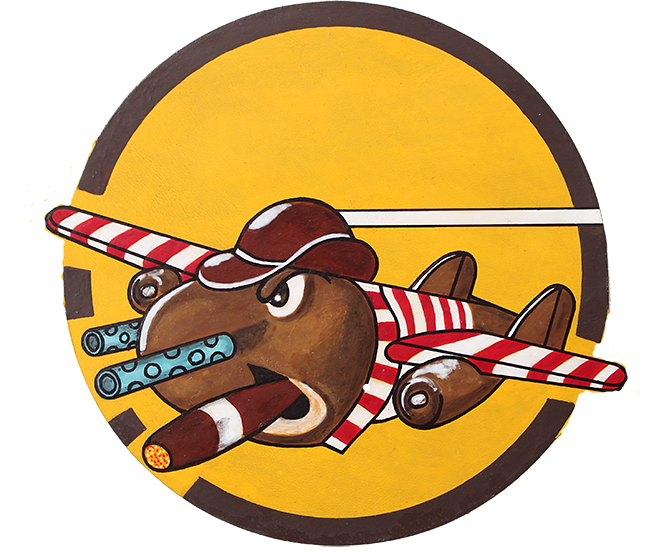
- 22d Bombardment Squadron emblem (Note: Approved 19 March 1945. Description: Over and through a lemon yellow disc, border light brown, a caricatured, pugnacious B-25 aircraft in flight, toward dexter base wearing a red brown derby and a red-and-white striped turtleneck sweater, having look of ferocity on caricatured face, machine gun barrels, proper, issuing from nostrils and a large brown cigar fired, with white band, held in mouth, leaving white speed lines and trailing smoke toward rear, proper.)

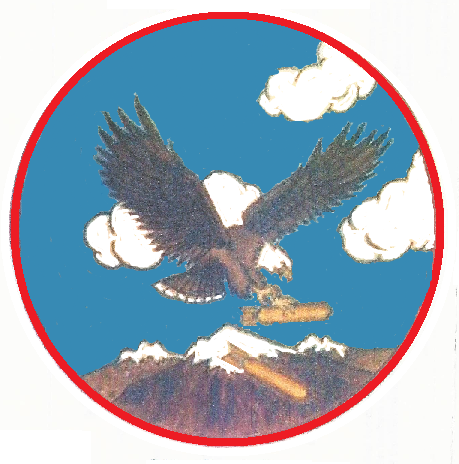
- 22d Bombardment Squadron emblem (Note: Used in 1942-1943.)

The 22d Expeditionary Air Refueling Squadron is a provisional United States Air Force unit, assigned to Air Mobility Command. It is engaged in combat operations as part of the global war on terrorism in Afghanistan. Its current status and location are undetermined. The squadron's permanent designation is the 22d Air Refueling Squadron.

During World War II, the 22d Bombardment Squadron was a heavy Boeing B-17 Flying Fortress and later, a medium North American B-25 Mitchell bomber squadron which fought in the Southwest Pacific and China-Burma-India theaters.

== History World War II ==
Formed in 1939 as a prewar bomber squadron, equipped with Douglas B-18 Bolos, later early model Boeing B-17 Flying Fortresses. Flew antisubmarine patrols off California coast, 8 December – c. 10 December 1941. Deployed to Southwest Pacific Theater and assigned to Fifth Air Force in Australia, engaging in combat, c. 13 January – c. 1 March 1942; detachment under control of United States Navy in combat from the Fiji Islands and Australia, 14 February – c. 14 March 1942. Surviving B-17 aircraft and personnel reassigned to other units in Australia, March 1942 and unit reassigned without personnel or equipment to the United States for re-equipping and remanning as medium bomber squadron.

Re-equipped as a North American B-25 Mitchell bomb squadron and deployed to Tenth Air Force for combat in the China-Burma-India Theater, 14 December 1942 – 25 July 1945. Deployed to Karachi, India; Chakulia, India; and Yangkai, China. While in Calcutta, India, the unit converted to the Douglas A-26 Invader attack bomber. During World War II, the unit earned two Distinguished Unit Citations and participated in nine separate campaigns. Personnel demobilized in India after the war, and the 22d was inactivated as a paper unit in the United States in November 1945.

=== Strategic Air Command ===
On 16 June 1950, the 22d Air Refueling Squadron was activated at March Air Force Base, California, flying the Boeing KC-97 Stratofreighter aircraft. The squadron relocated to McChord Air Force Base, Washington on 15 June 1960 where it later upgraded to the Boeing KC-135 Stratotanker. The squadron was inactivated on 1 July 1962. The squadron was reactivated at March on 1 July 1963, flying the KC-135 and EC-135 aircraft.

In 1962, SAC established an airborne command post at Offutt Air Force Base, Nebraska, nicknamed Operation Looking Glass, to ensure continuity of command and control of SAC forces in the event of a nuclear attack. Looking Glass was soon augmented by auxiliary aircraft stationed with the headquarters of SAC's three Numbered Air Forces. The 22d received Boeing EC-135C aircraft to operate SAC's Western Auxiliary Command Post's airborne element for Fifteenth Air Force. The 22d continued to operate PACCS aircraft until 1 April 1970, when SAC reorganized its airborne command post aircraft and withdrew them from vulnerable bases near the coasts and assigned them to the 2d, 3d, and 4th Airborne Command and Control Squadrons, stationed at bases closer to the heartland of North America.

It deployed to Andersen Air Force Base, Guam whereupon it supported the Vietnam War until mid-1973. The squadron was inactivated on 1 December 1989.

On 19 Sep 1985 the 22d Air Refueling Squadron was consolidated with the 22d Bombardment Squadron, a unit that was last active 2 Nov 1945. This action was directed by Department of the Air Force Letter DAF/MPM 662q Attachment 1 (Active Units), 19 Sep 1985. The Consolidated Unit retained the designation of 22d Air Refueling Squadron, Heavy.

=== Mobility unit ===
Activated on 1 October 1992 at Mountain Home Air Force Base, Idaho, it was assigned seven KC-135R model aircraft as part of the Air Force's first Composite Air Intervention Wing. The squadron was consecutively awarded the 366th Wing's Silver Bolt Award for foreign object damage prevention during fiscal year 1997-1 and 1997–2, as well Air Combat Command (ACC)'s Best Tanker Award for 1993. The squadron garnered the 366th Wing's only "Outstanding" rating during the July 1995 Operational Readiness Inspection and its deployed maintenance won the ACC IG Superior Performance Team Award during the 366th Wing's 1997 AEF and first ever combat zone ORI. The 22d ARS was the only squadron in the 366th Wing to display nose art on the entire fleet (nose art developed by crew chief, SSgt Tony Eubanks). It was also awarded the Outstanding Unit Award, 1 June 1998 through 31 May 1999. The squadron was inactivated in 2002.

The unit was converted to provisional status in 2003, and assigned to Air Mobility Command to activate as needed to support combat operations under the purview of AFCENT, in combat areas as part of the global war on terrorism in Afghanistan.

== Lineage ==
22d Bombardment Squadron

- Constituted as the 22d Bombardment Squadron (Heavy) and activated on 20 October 1939

Redesignated 22d Bombardment Squadron (Medium) c. 15 September 1942
Redesignated 22d Bombardment Squadron, Medium 28 April 1944
Inactivated on 2 November 1945

- Consolidated with the 22d Air Refueling Squadron as the 22d Air Refueling Squadron on 19 September 1985

22d Expeditionary Air Refueling Squadron

- Constituted as the 22d Air Refueling Squadron, Medium on 5 May 1950

Activated on 15 June 1950
Discontinued and inactivated on 1 July 1962

- Redesignated 22d Air Refueling Squadron, Heavy and activated on 21 February 1963 (not organized)

Organized on 1 July 1963

- Consolidated with the 22d Bombardment Squadron on 19 September 1985

Inactivated on 1 December 1989

- Redesignated 22d Air Refueling Squadron on 29 September 1992

Activated on 1 October 1992
Inactivated on 30 August 2002

- Redesignated 22d Expeditionary Air Refueling Squadron and converted to provisional status, 22 January 2003

=== Assignments ===
- 7th Bombardment Group, 20 October 1939 (attached to 17th Bombardment Group for training, 26 April – 28 May 1942)
- 341st Bombardment Group, 15 September 1942 – 2 November 1945
- 22d Bombardment Group, 16 June 1950 (attached to 22d Bombardment Wing after 10 February 1951)
- 22d Bombardment Wing, 16 June 1952
- 92d Bombardment Wing (later 92d Strategic Aerospace Wing), 15 June 1960 – 1 July 1962
- Strategic Air Command, 21 February 1963 (not organized)
- 22d Bombardment (later, 22d Air Refueling) Wing, 1 July 1963 – 1 December 1989
- 366th Wing, 1 October 1992 – 30 August 2002
- Air Mobility Command to activate or inactivate at any time after 22 January 2003
- Air Combat Command to activate or inactivate at any time after 19 March 2003

376th Expeditionary Operations Group 22 January 2003 - c. 2014

=== Stations ===
- Hamilton Field, California, 20 October 1939
- Fort Douglas, Utah, 7 September 1940
- Salt Lake City Army Air Base, Utah, c. 21 June – 13 November 1941
- Archerfield Airport, (Brisbane) Australia, 22 December 1941

Air echelon at: Muroc Army Air Field, California, 8 - c. 12 December 194
Air echelon at: Hickam Field, Hawaii (Territory), 18 December 1941 – 5 January 1942
Air echelon at: Singosari, Java, 13 – 19 January 1942

- Jogjakarta, Java, 19 January 1942 (detachment operated from Nandi Airport, Fiji, 14-c. 18 February 1942; RAAF Base Townsville, Australia, c. 20 February – c. 14 March 1942)
- Essendon Airport (Melbourne), Australia, c. 4 March – 6 April 1942
- Columbia Army Air Base, South Carolina, 26 April – 28 May 1942
- Karachi, India, 23 July 1942
- Chakulia, India, 3 December 1942
- Yangkai, China, 8 January 1944 – c. September 1945 (detachments operated from Yunnani, 29 April – 6 May 1944 and c. 5 November 1944 – c. 20 January 1945; Peishiyi, February – 25 March 1945; Chihkiang, 29 March – c. 1 April 1945
- Camp Kilmer, New Jersey, 1–2 November 1945
- March Air Force Base, California, 16 June 1950 (deployed to RAF Mildenhall, England, 7 December 1953 – 5 March 1954; Ernest Harmon Air Force Base, Newfoundland, 3 March – 19 April 1955; Elmendorf Air Force Base, Alaska, 3 January – 2 May 1956)
- McChord Air Force Base, Washington, 15 June 1960 – 1 July 1962
- March Air Force Base, California, 1 July 1963 – 1 December 1989 (deployed at Andersen Air Force Base, Guam, 1 July 1963 – 15 August 1973)
- Mountain Home Air Force Base, Idaho, 1 October 1992 – 30 August 2002
- Transit Center at Manas, Kyrgyzstan, 22 January 2003 – c. 2014

=== Aircraft ===
- Douglas B-18 Bolo, 1939–1940
- Northrop A-17, 1939–1940
- Boeing B-17 Flying Fortress, 1940–1942
- North American B-25 Mitchell; 1942–1945
- Douglas A-26 Invader, 1945
- Boeing KC-97 Stratotanker, 1952–1960
- Boeing KC-135 Stratotanker, 1960–1962; 1963–1967; 1967–1989; 1992–2002, 2003 – present
- Boeing EC-135, 1963–1970

== See also ==
- United States Army Air Forces in Australia
- Post Attack Command and Control System – for 22 ARS' contribution to PACCS
