= David N. Miller =

U.S. Space Force general

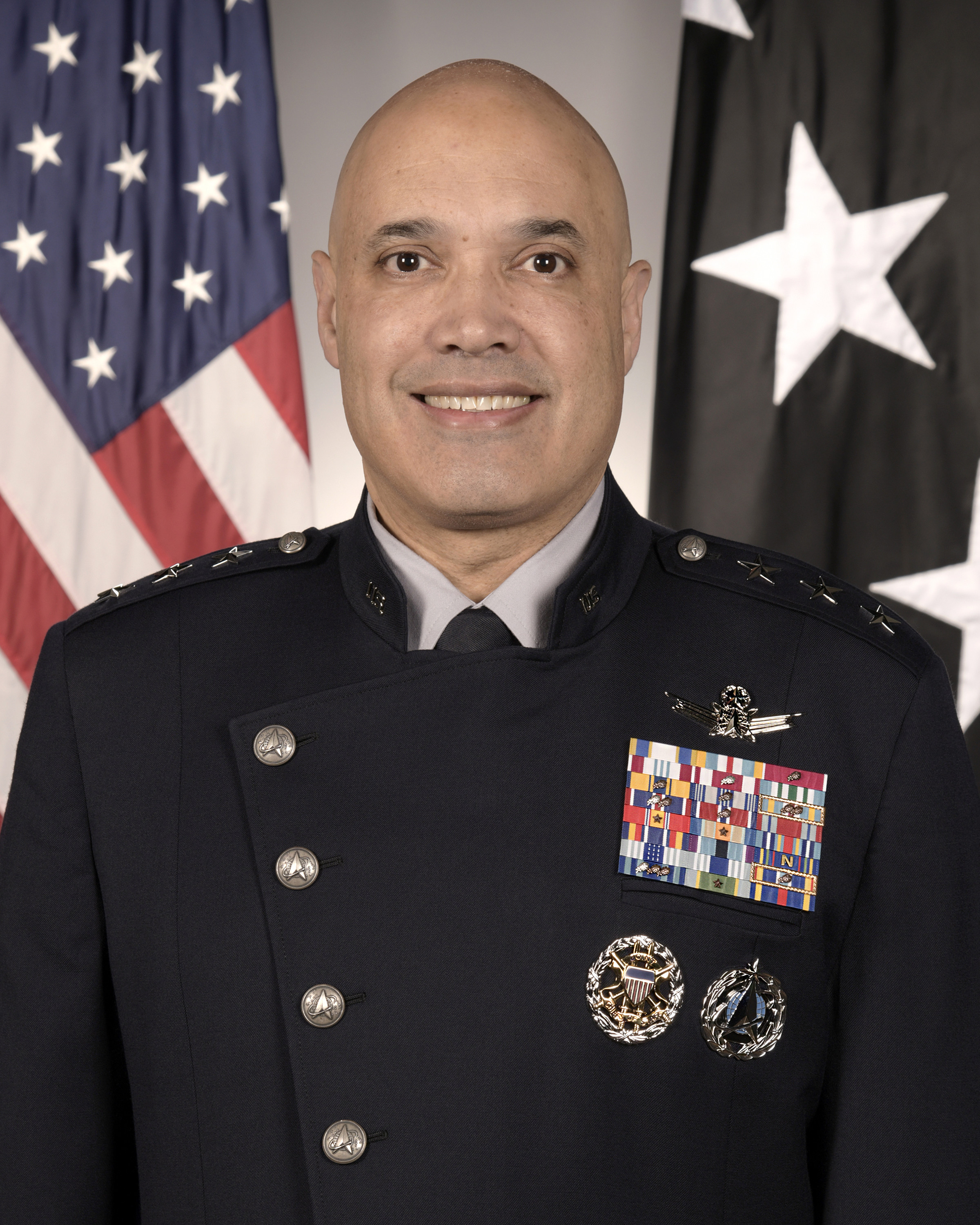
- Official portrait, 2024
- Born: May 9, 1971 (age 55); Newburgh, New York, U.S.
- Education: Lafayette College (BA): Regis University (MBA)
- Military career
- Allegiance: United States
- Branch: United States Air Force: United States Space Force
- Service years: 1993–2021 (Air Force): 2021–present (Space Force)
- Rank: Lieutenant General
- Nickname: Rock
- Commands: Space Operations Command: 460th Space Wing; 21st Operations Group; 2nd Range Operations Squadron
- Conflicts: Operation Inherent Resolve
- Awards: Air Force Distinguished Service Medal: Defense Superior Service Medal; Legion of Merit (2)
- David N. Miller's voice Miller's opening statement at a House Armed Services subcommittee hearing on the FY2024 missile budget request Recorded April 18, 2023

Signature
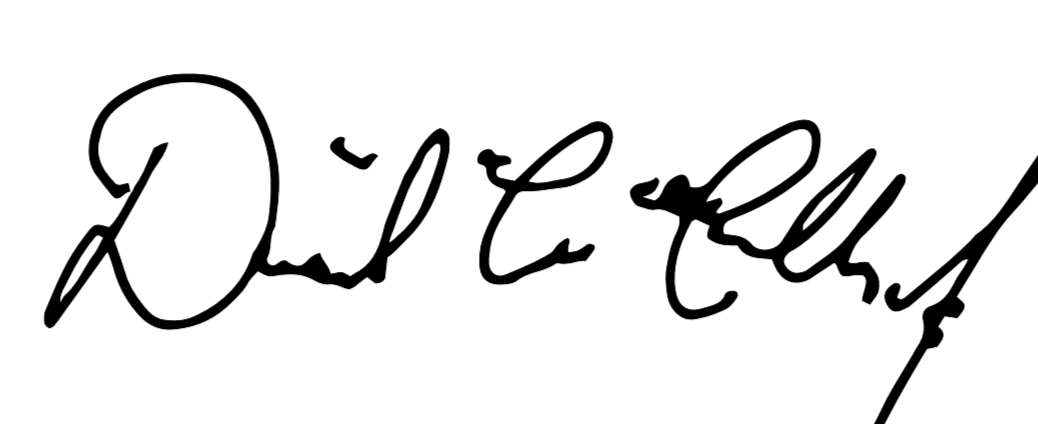

David N. Miller Jr. (born May 9, 1971) is a United States Space Force lieutenant general who has served as the deputy chief of space operations for strategy, plans, programs, and requirements. He previously served as the commander of Space Operations Command.

Miller is a native of Newburgh, New York. He was commissioned into the United States Air Force in 1993 after graduating from Lafayette College. He is a career missile and space operations officer who has commanded the 2nd Range Operations Squadron, 21st Operations Group, and 460th Space Wing. He also served as the senior military assistant to Secretary Barbara Barrett.

Miller led the reestablishment of the U.S. Space Command. He transferred into the Space Force in 2021 as a major general. In 2024, he was promoted to lieutenant general and became the second commander of Space Operations Command.

== Early life and education ==
Miller was born in Newburgh, New York. His mother, a single mom, is a New York City school teacher. He originally planned to enter the United States Air Force Academy, but upon visiting the campus, he felt he preferred "a little more of the traditional 'college' experience." His sister, a sophomore at Lafayette College at Easton, Pennsylvania, convinced him to enter Lafayette.

Miller received a B.A. degree in anthropology and sociology in 1993 from Lafayette. He then earned an M.B.A. with honors in 1997 from Regis University at Denver, Colorado. He also received a Master of National Security and Strategic Studies in 2005 from the Naval War College, a Master of Airpower Arts and Science in 2006 from the School of Advanced Air and Space Studies, and an M.S. in national security strategy in 2013 from the National War College.

Miller also attended Squadron Officer School, Air Command and Staff College, USAF Weapons School, and Air War College. He also participated in leadership programs and seminars from the Center for Creative Leadership, Alan Freed Associates, and Institute for Defense Business.

== Military career ==
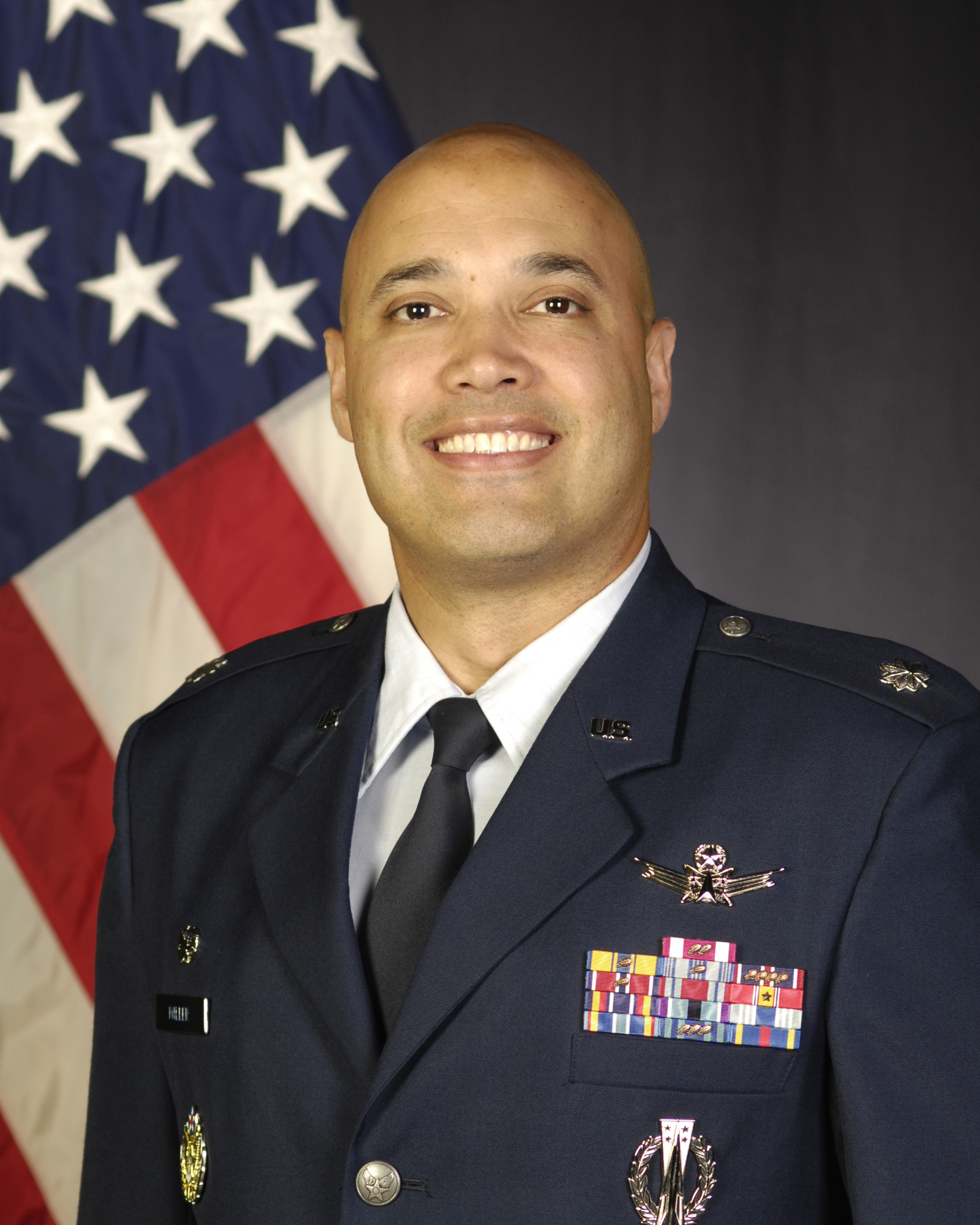
Miller as a lieutenant colonel, 2009

Miller was commissioned into the United States Air Force on May 29, 1993. After commissioning he served as a Gold Bar Recruiter in Rutgers University at New Brunswick, New Jersey with the Air Force Reserve Officer Training Corps Detachment 48. After that, he went to undergraduate missile training at Vandenberg Air Force Base, California. He finished the training as an outstanding performer.

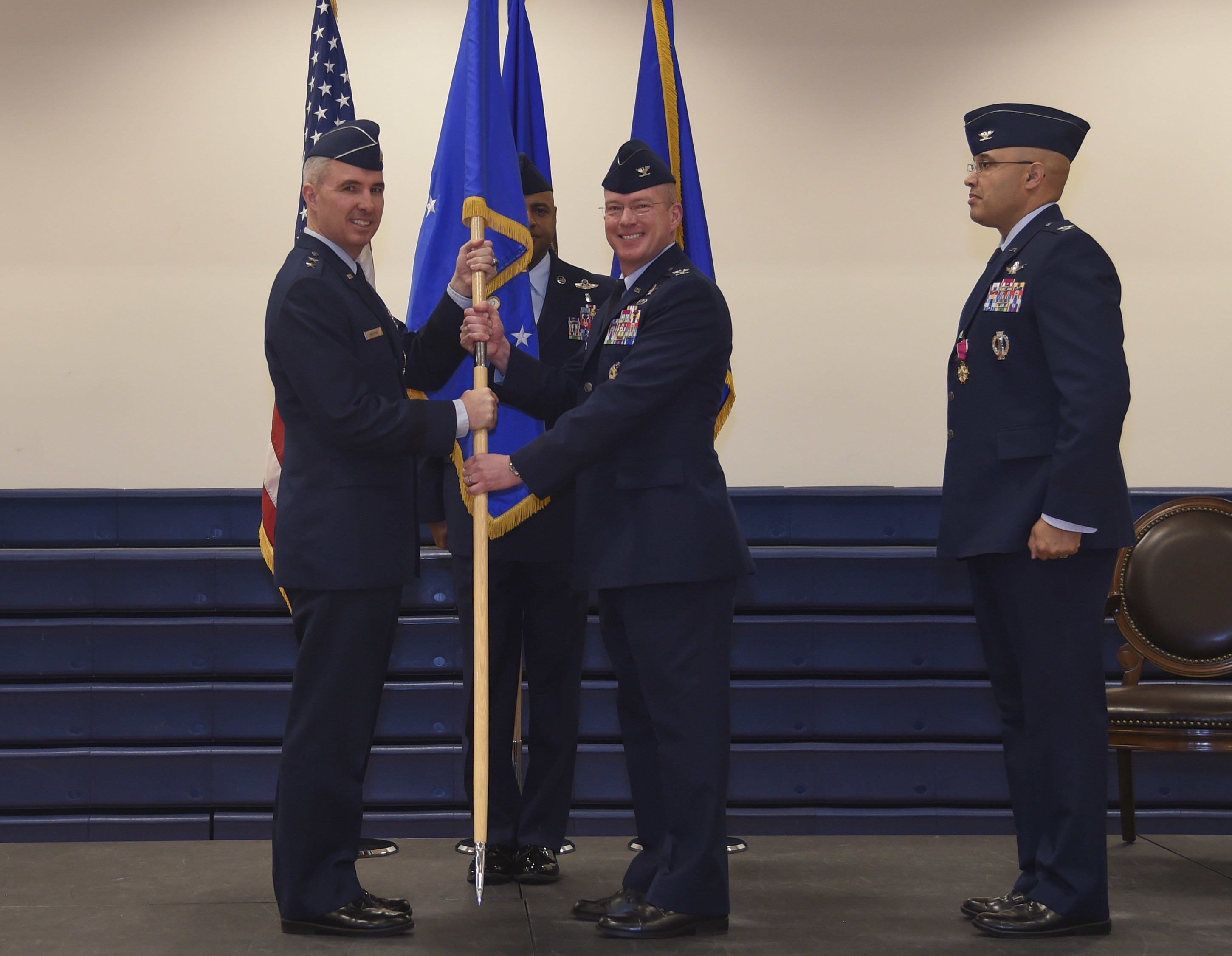
Miller relinquishes command of the 460th Space Wing to Col Endicott in 2018

After undergraduate missile training, Miller was assigned to his first operational assignment at Francis E. Warren Air Force Base, Wyoming, as an Intercontinental Ballistic Missile operator, instructor, and senior standardization and evaluation crew commander with the 321st Missile Squadron. He stayed there for four years until he shifted to the space operations career field. From 1998 to 2000, he served as weapons and tactical flight commander of the 2nd Space Warning Squadron at Buckley Air Force Base, Colorado. After that, he was assigned as executive officer with the 21st Operations Group at Peterson Air Force Base, Colorado, for over a year.

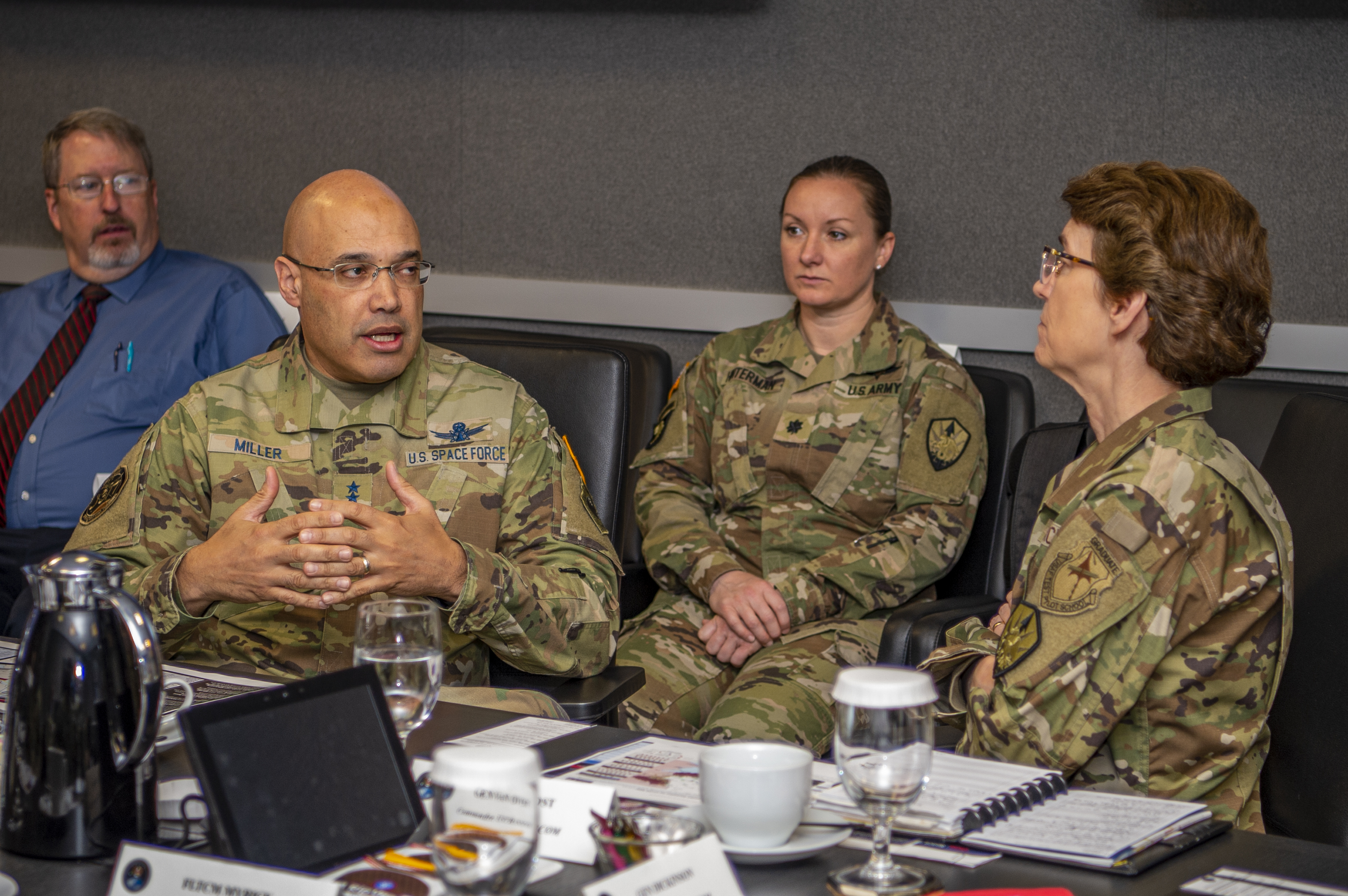
Miller talks to Gen Van Ovost during her visit to U.S. Space Command, 2022

After graduating from Weapons School, Miller was reassigned with the 21st Operations Group as chief of weapons and tactics. From 2002 to 2005, he was assigned at Hickam Air Force Base, Hawaii, as chief of strategy plans of the Pacific Air Forces (PACAF) Air Operations Center and legislative liaison with the PACAF commander's action group. After that tour, he went back to the United States to study for two years, first at the College of Naval Command and Staff and then at the School of Advanced Air and Space Studies.

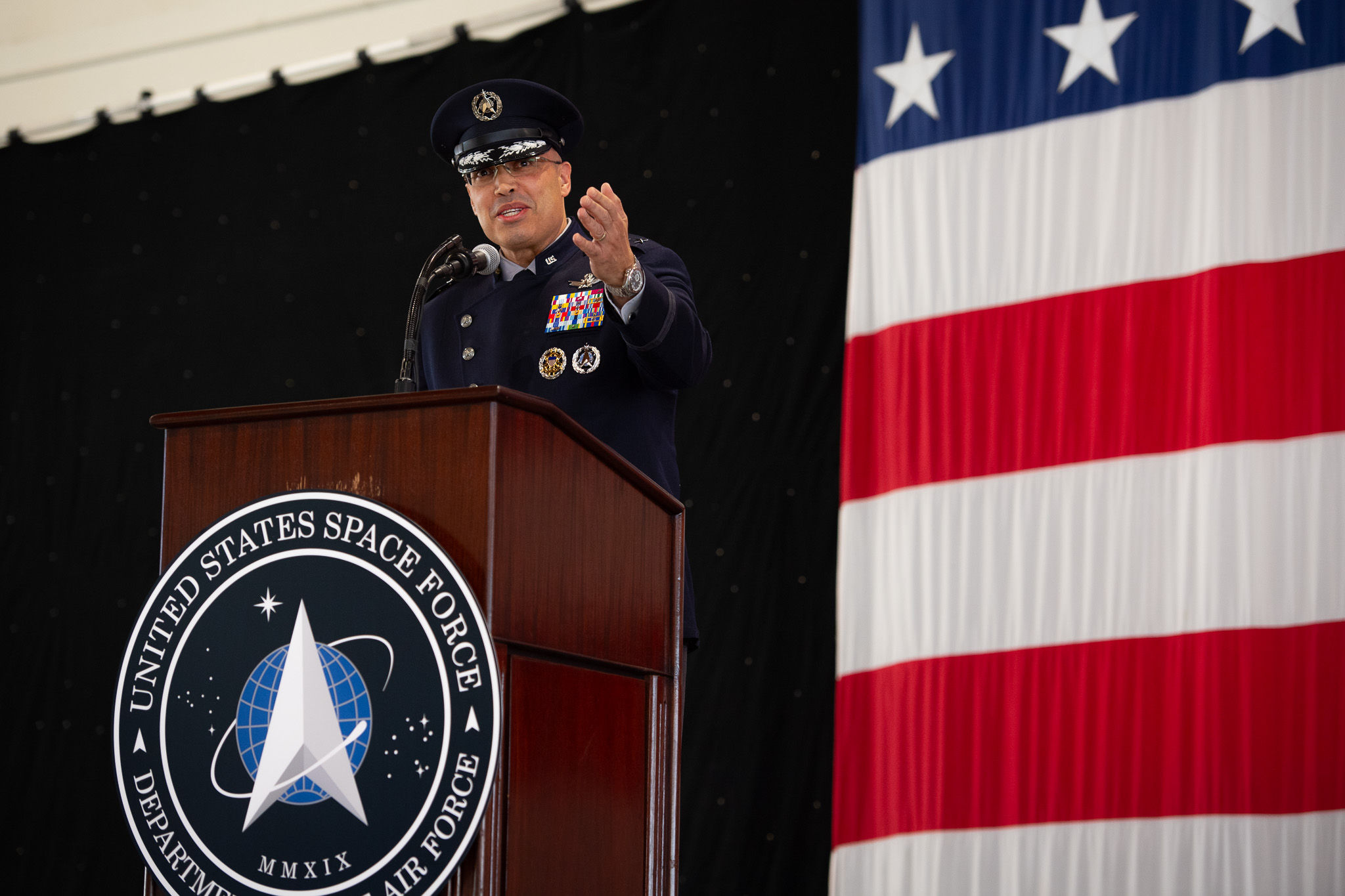
Miller speaks after he took command of SpOC, 2024

From 2007 to 2008, Miller was stationed at the Pentagon as chief of the Space Control Division of the Air Force. Afterwards, he was assigned back to Vandenberg as chief of the Combat Operations Division at the 614th Air Operations Center and Joint Space Operations Center. He then went on to command 2nd Range Operations Squadron from 2009 to 2011, in charge of launch operations for the 30th Space Wing.

Miller was reassigned to the Pentagon in 2011 as a military assistant to Erin C. Conaton, who at that time was serving as the under secretary of the Air Force. After graduating from the National War College, he went back with the 21st Operations Group, now serving as commander. He commanded the 21st Operations Group from 2013 to 2015. After his second command tour, he was stationed to Iraq as a senior advisor to the Prime Minister’s Office and Ministry of Interior.

In 2016, Miller took command of the 460th Space Wing, where he was in charge of the Air Force's missile warning unit. He served as commander for two years, after which he was reassigned as director of plans, programs, and financial management with the Air Force Space Command (AFSPC) at Peterson Air Force Base. While at AFSPC, he was promoted to brigadier general in 2018. He was tapped by General John W. Raymond to lead a task force on conducting detailed planning and implementation for the reestablishment of the United States Space Command.

In January 2020, Miller was assigned as senior military assistant to the Secretary of the Air Force Barbara Barrett. He served in this position for a year, after which he was reassigned as the first assistant deputy chief of space operations for operations, cyber, and nuclear. Six months later, he moved back to Peterson Air Force Base as director of operations, training, and force development of the United States Air Force.

In April 2021, Miller was nominated for transfer to the United States Space Force and promotion to major general. He was one of the first Air Force general officers who transferred to the Space Force. He was also one of the first three major generals in the service among, Major General DeAnna Burt and Major General Douglas Schiess.

In September 2023, Miller was nominated for promotion to lieutenant general and assignment as commander of Space Operations Command (SpOC). He would replace Lieutenant General Stephen Whiting who was selected to serve as commander of the United States Space Command. His nomination was among the hundreds of military nominations stalled by Senator Tommy Tuberville's hold over the Pentagon's abortion policy. While he waited for confirmation, he was temporarily assigned as special assistant to the vice chief of space operations while stationed at Peterson. His nomination was confirmed on December 5, 2023. On January 9, 2024, he was promoted to lieutenant general and took command of SpOC. As SpOC commander, he is responsible for the generation, presentation, and sustainment of Space Force operational forces.

== Awards and decorations ==
Miller is the recipient of the following awards:

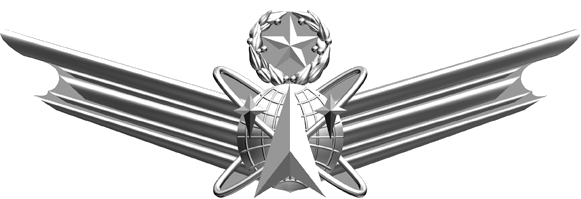
Command Space Operations Badge

Basic Missile Operations Badge

Office of the Joint Chiefs of Staff Identification Badge

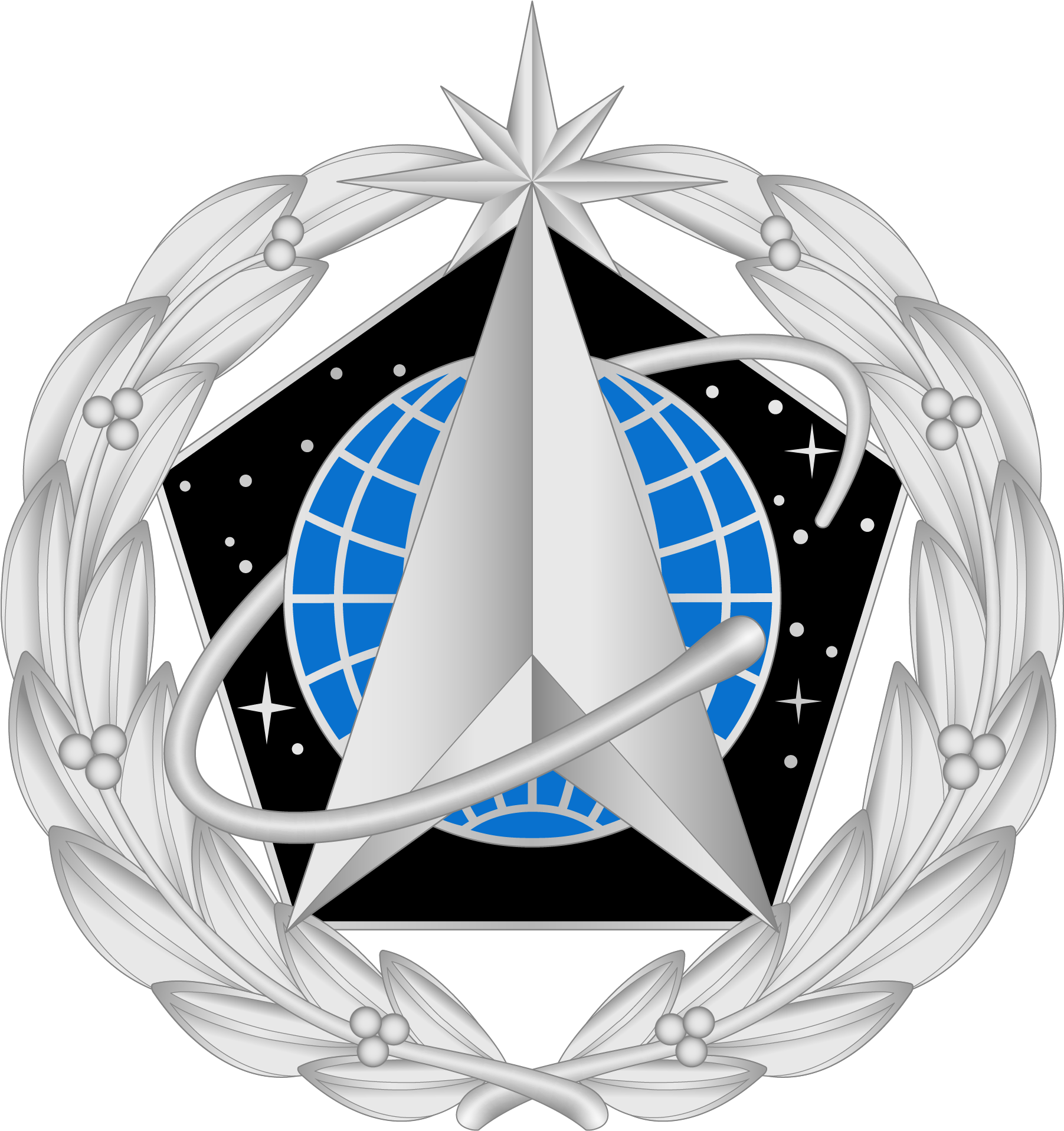

Space Staff Badge

Air Force Distinguished Service Medal
Defense Superior Service Medal
Legion of Merit with one bronze oak leaf cluster
Meritorious Service Medal
Meritorious Service Medal with one silver oak leaf cluster
Joint Service Commendation Medal
Air Force Commendation Medal with one bronze oak leaf cluster
Air Force Achievement Medal with one bronze oak leaf cluster
Joint Meritorious Unit Award with two bronze oak leaf clusters
Air Force Outstanding Unit Award with one silver and one bronze oak leaf clusters
Air Force Organizational Excellence Award with one bronze oak leaf cluster
Combat Readiness Medal
National Defense Service Medal with one bronze service star
Inherent Resolve Campaign Medal with one bronze service star
Global War on Terrorism Expeditionary Medal
Global War on Terrorism Service Medal
Humanitarian Service Medal
Nuclear Deterrence Operations Service Medal with "N" device
Air Force Overseas Short Tour Service Ribbon
Air Force Overseas Long Tour Service Ribbon
Air Force Expeditionary Service Ribbon with gold frame and bronze oak leaf cluster
Air Force Longevity Service Award with one silver and one bronze oak leaf clusters
Air Force Small Arms Expert Marksmanship Ribbon with one bronze service star
Air Force Training Ribbon

== Dates of promotion ==
Rank	Branch	Date
Second Lieutenant	Air Force	May 29, 1993
First Lieutenant	Air Force	June 18, 1995
Captain	Air Force	June 18, 1997
Major	Air Force	November 1, 2003
Lieutenant Colonel	Air Force	September 1, 2007
Colonel	Air Force	July 1, 2012
Brigadier General	Air Force	August 17, 2018
Brigadier General	Space Force	~April 29, 2021
Major General	Space Force	July 6, 2021
Lieutenant General	Space Force	January 9, 2024

== Writings ==
- With Kathryn M. G. Boehlefeld and James Wood Forsyth Jr. (Winter 2023). "Ten Propositions Regarding Nuclear Weapons Detterence" (PDF). Æther: A Journal of Strategic Airpower & Spacepower. 2 (4): 22–35.

Military offices
Preceded by John W. Wagner	Commander of the 460th Space Wing; 2016–2018	Succeeded by Troy Endicott
Preceded by Trent H. Edwards	Director of Plans, Programs, and Financial Management of the Air Force Space Command, later Headquarters, United States Space Force; 2018–2020	Succeeded by Stephen G. Purdy Jr.
Preceded by Leslie A. Maher	Senior Military Assistant to the Secretary of the Air Force; 2020–2021	Succeeded by Andrew M. Clark
New office	Assistant Deputy Chief of Space Operations for Operations, Cyber and Nuclear of the United States Space Force; 2021	Succeeded by Troy Endicott
Preceded by William G. Holt	Director of Operations, Training, and Force Development of the United States Space Command; 2021–2023	Succeeded by Troy Endicott
Preceded by Stephen Whiting	Commander of Space Operations Command; 2024–2025	Succeeded by Gregory Gagnon
Preceded by Shawn Bratton	Deputy Chief of Space Operations for Strategy, Plans, Programs, and Requirements; 2025–present	Incumbent
