= Troy Endicott =

U.S. Space Force general

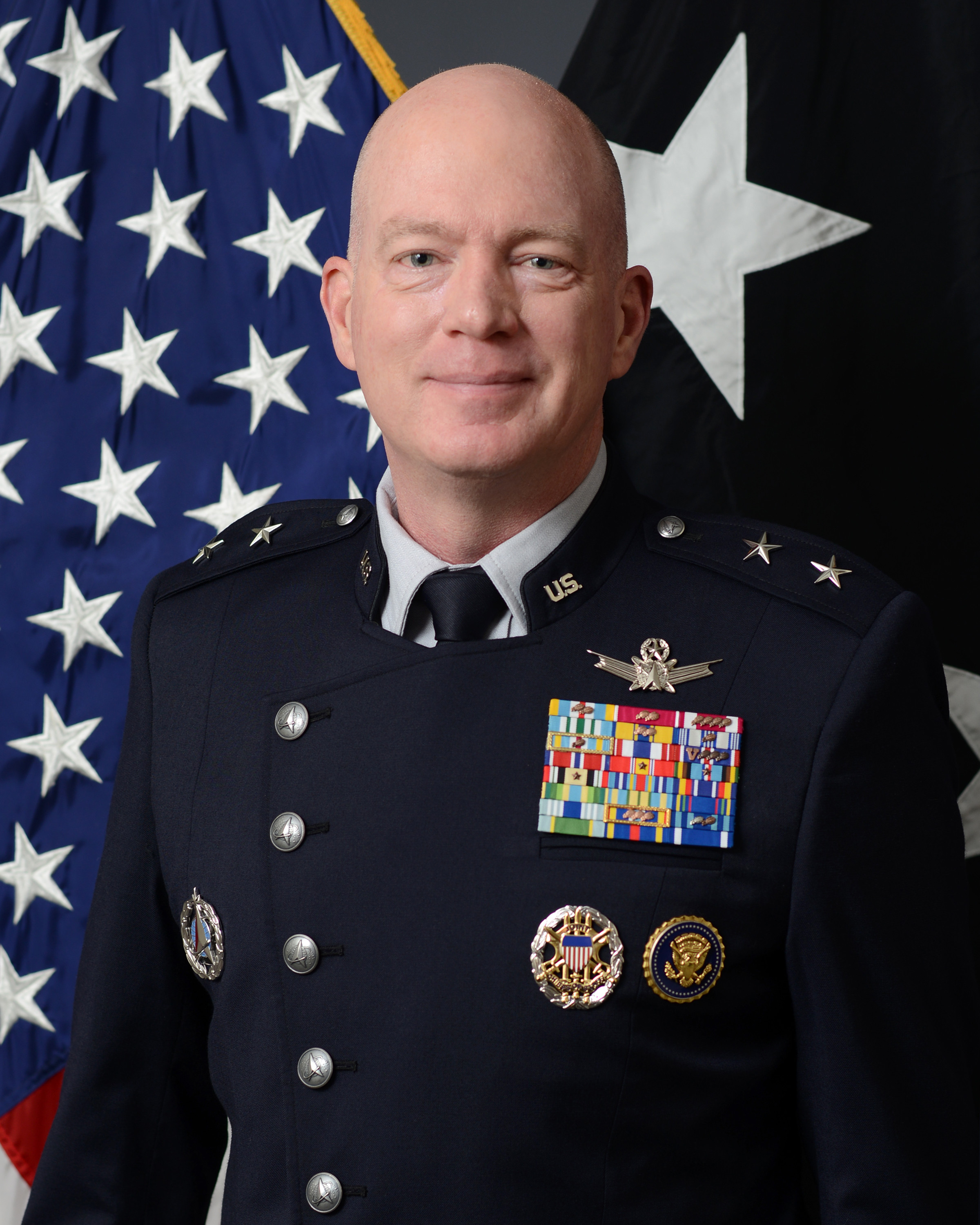
- Official portrait, 2025
- Born: April 15, 1971 (age 55); Morristown, New Jersey, U.S.
- Education: Embry–Riddle Aeronautical University (BS): Air Force Institute of Technology (MS)
- Military career
- Allegiance: United States
- Branch: United States Air Force: United States Space Force
- Service years: 1994–2021 (Air Force): 2021–2026 (Space Force)
- Rank: Major General
- Commands: 460th Space Wing: 21st Operations Group; 21st Operations Support Squadron
- Awards: Defense Superior Service Medal (2): Legion of Merit (3)

Troy Lynd Endicott (born April 15, 1971) is a retired United States Space Force major general who served as the vice director of joint force development of the Joint Staff. He previously served as the director of global space operations of the United States Space Command. He also served as the assistant deputy chief of space operations for operations, cyber, and nuclear.

In July 2023, Endicott was nominated for promotion to major general.

== Education ==
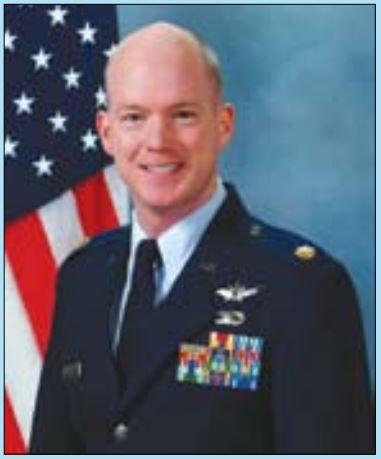
Endicott as a major

- 1994 Bachelor of Science, Aerospace Engineering, Embry-Riddle Aeronautical University, Prescott, Arizona
- 1999 Master of Science, space operations, Air Force Institute of Technology, Wright-Patterson Air Force Base, Ohio
- 1999 Squadron Officer School, Maxwell AFB, Alabama
- 2002 U.S. Air Force Weapons School, Nellis AFB, Nevada
- 2004 Air Command and Staff College, Maxwell AFB, Ala., by correspondence
- 2006 Army Command and General Staff College, Fort Leavenworth, Kansas
- 2008 Air War College, Maxwell AFB, Ala., by correspondence
- 2013 National Defense Fellowship (Senior Developmental Education), Harvard University Belfer Center for Science & International Affairs, Cambridge, Massachusetts
- 2014 Joint Forces Staff College (Joint Professional Military Education, Phase II), Norfolk, Virginia
- 2016 Leadership Development Program, Center for Creative Leadership, Colorado Springs, Colorado

== Assignments ==
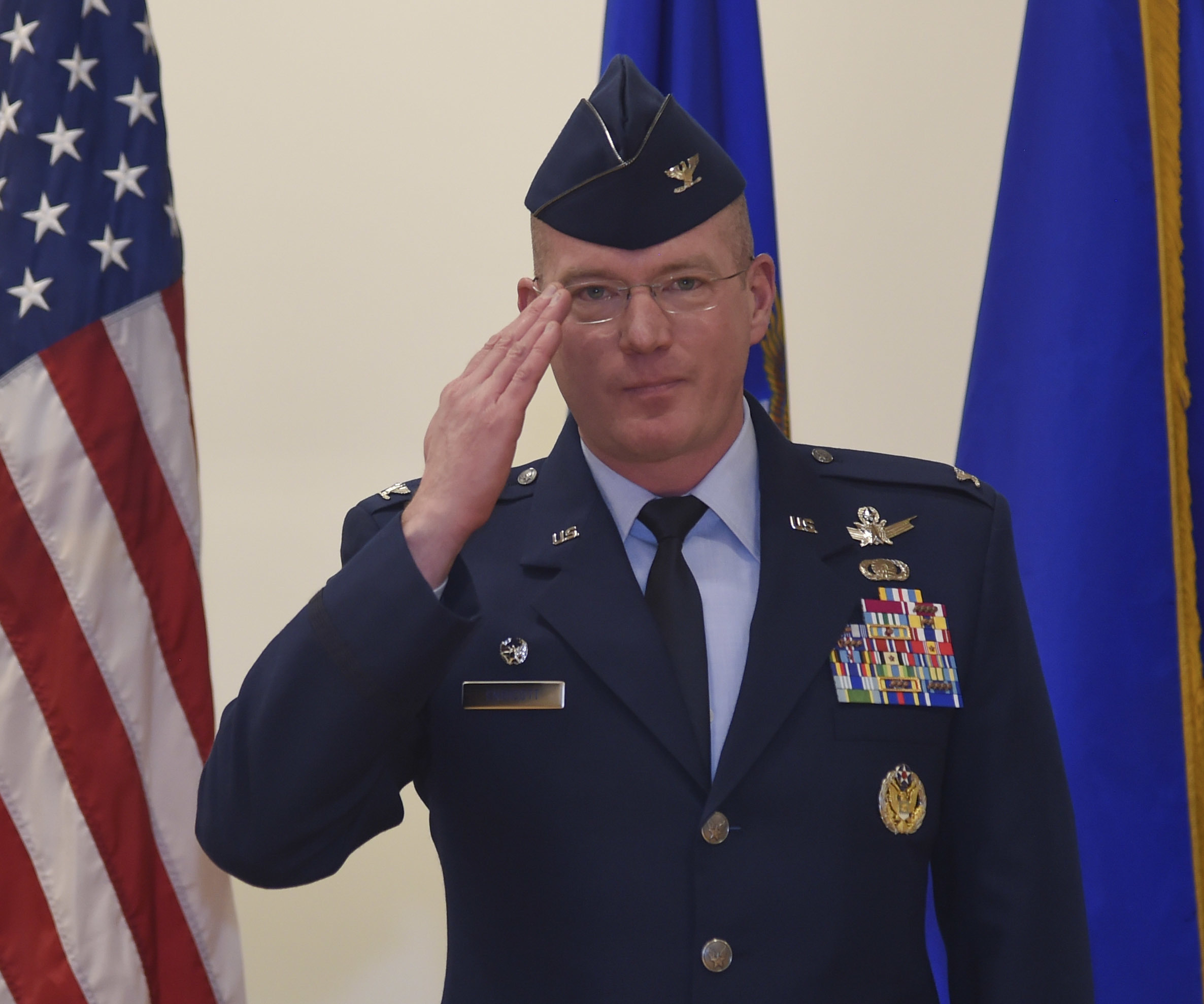
Endicott assumed command of the 460th Space Wing in 2018

- September 1994–April 1995, Flight Test Project Officer, Tri-Service Standoff Attack Missile Program Office, Aeronautical Systems Center, Wright-Patterson Air Force Base, Ohio
- April 1995–August 1997, Reconnaissance Systems Project Manager, Aeronautical Systems Center, Wright-Patterson AFB, Ohio
- August 1997–March 1999, student, Air Force Institute of Technology, Wright-Patterson AFB, Ohio
- March 1999–January 2002, Orbital Analyst Instructor (Air Education and Training Command Master Instructor) and flight commander, Detachment 1, 533rd Training Squadron, Schriever AFB, Colorado
- January 2002–June 2002, student, U.S. Air Force Weapons School, Nellis AFB, Nevada
- June 2002–March 2005, chief, Space Operations Plans, Headquarters 16th Air Force, Aviano Air Base, Italy
- April 2005–June 2006, student, U.S. Army Command & General Staff College, Fort Leavenworth, Kansas
- June 2006–April 2008, chief, Current Operations, Headquarters Air Force Space Command Space Operations Squadron, and member, Commander's Action Group, Headquarters Air Force Space Command, Peterson AFB, Colorado
- May 2008–May 2009, operations officer, 76th Space Control Squadron, Peterson AFB, Colorado
- May 2009–May 2011, commander, 21st Operations Support Squadron, Peterson AFB, Colorado
- June 2011–June 2012, executive officer to the commander, 14th Air Force and Joint Functional Component Command for Space, Vandenberg AFB, California
- July 2012–June 2013, senior developmental education student, National Defense Fellow, Belfer Center for Science & International Affairs, John F. Kennedy School of Government, Harvard University, Cambridge, Massachusetts
- July 2013–June 2015, chief, Policy and Integration Division, Department of Defense Executive Agent for Space Staff, Office of the Secretary of the Air Force, the Pentagon, Arlington, Virginia
- June 2015–May 2017, commander, 21st Operations Group, Peterson AFB, Colorado
- June 2017–January 2018, executive officer to the commander, Air Force Space Command, Peterson AFB, Colorado
- January 2018–May 2019, commander, 460th Space Wing, Buckley AFB, Colorado
- May 2019–May 2021, director for space policy, National Security Council, the White House, Washington, D.C.
- May 2021–July 2023, assistant deputy chief of space operations for operations, cyber and nuclear, United States Space Force, the Pentagon, Arlington, Virginia
- July 2023–July 2025, director, global space operations, U.S. Space Command, Schriever Space Force Base, Colo.
- July 2025-present, vice director, joint force development, Joint Staff, the Pentagon, Arlington, Virginia

== Awards and decorations ==
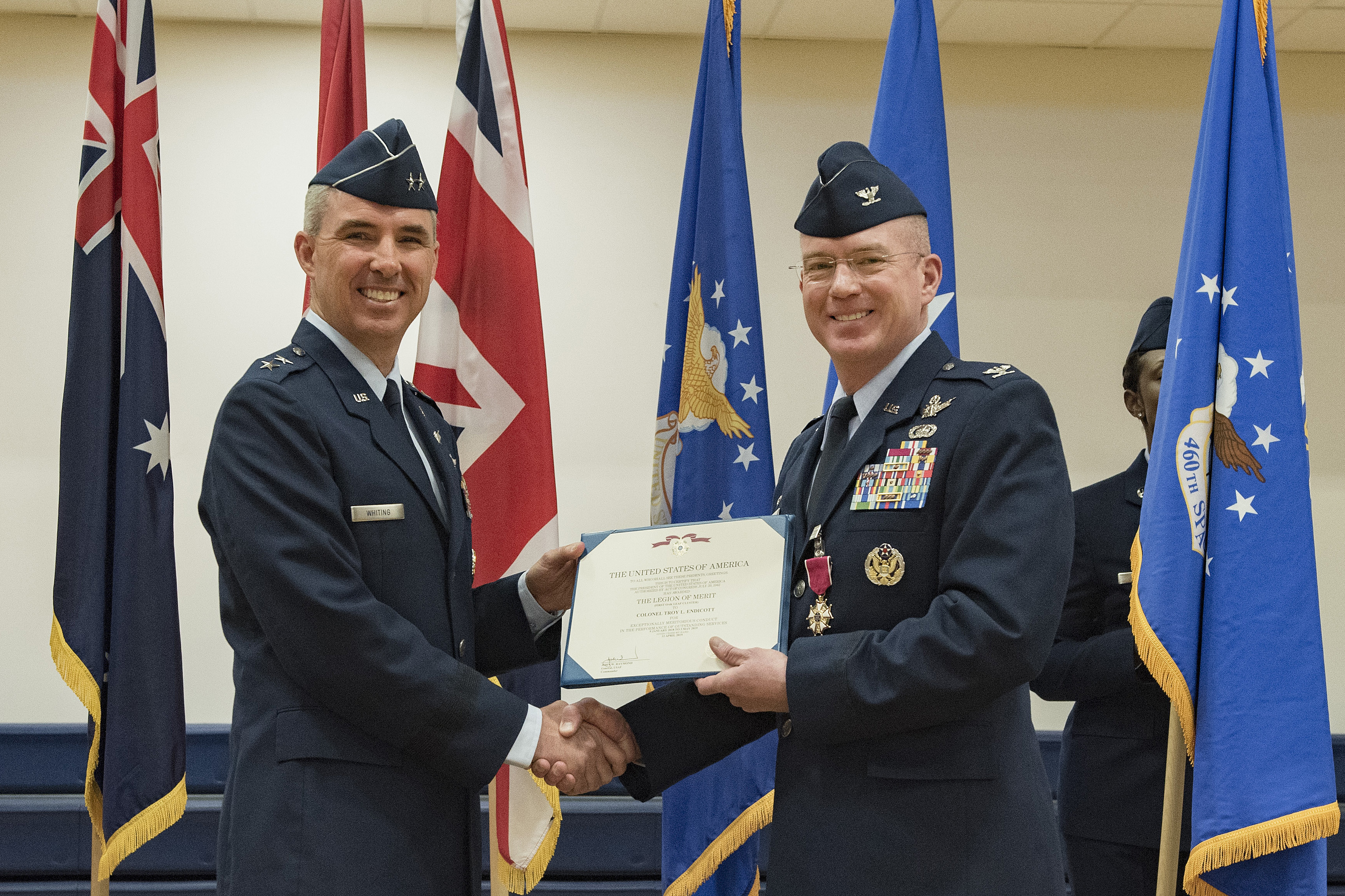
Endicott receives the Legion of Merit from Maj Gen Whiting after relinquishing command of the 460th Space Wing to Col Pepper, 2019

Endicott is the recipient of the following awards:

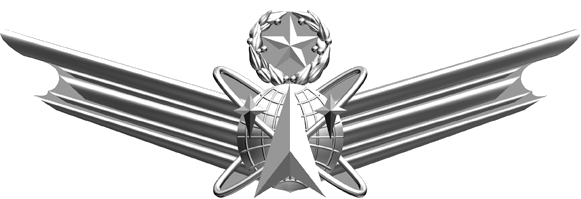
Command Space Operations Badge

Acquisition and Financial Management Badge

Presidential Service Badge

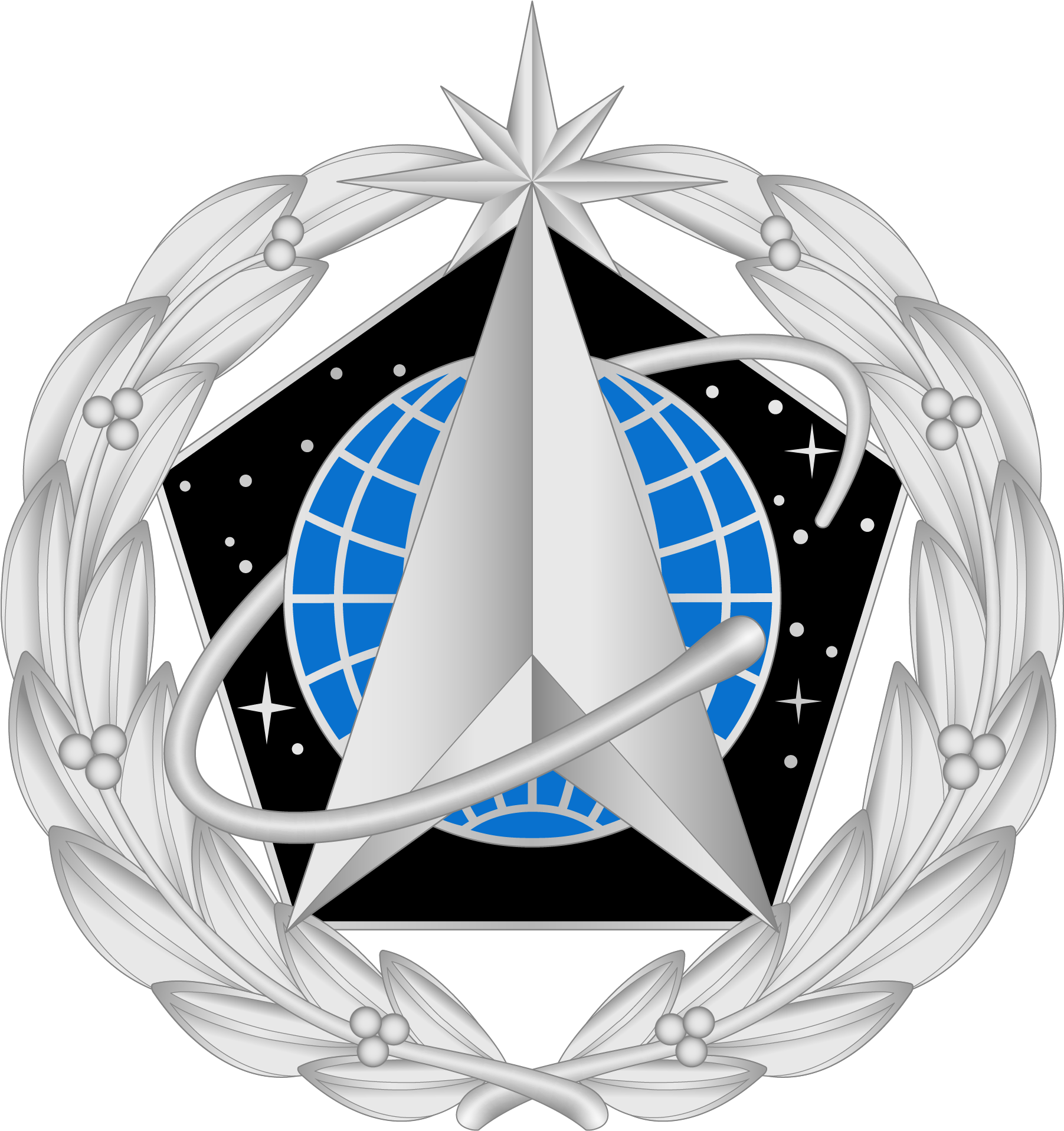

Space Staff Badge

United States Space Command Badge

Defense Superior Service Medal with one bronze oak leaf cluster
Legion of Merit with two bronze oak leaf clusters
Meritorious Service Medal with four oak leaf clusters
Joint Service Commendation Medal
Air Force Commendation Medal with two bronze oak leaf clusters
Air Force Achievement Medal with one bronze oak leaf cluster
Joint Meritorious Unit Award with one bronze oak leaf cluster
Air Force Meritorious Unit Award
Air Force Outstanding Unit Award with "V" device and three bronze oak leaf clusters
Air Force Organizational Excellence Award
National Defense Service Medal with one bronze service star
Armed Forces Expeditionary Medal with one bronze service star
Iraq Campaign Medal with one bronze service star
Global War on Terrorism Expeditionary Medal
Global War on Terrorism Service Medal
Armed Forces Service Medal
Outstanding Volunteer Service Medal
Nuclear Deterrence Operations Service Medal
Air Force Overseas Long Tour Service Ribbon
Air Force Expeditionary Service Ribbon with gold frame and three bronze oak leaf clusters
Air Force Longevity Service Award with one silver and one bronze oak leaf cluster
Air Force Small Arms Expert Marksmanship Ribbon
Air Force Training Ribbon
NATO Medal (Yugoslavia)

== Dates of promotion ==
Rank	Branch	Date
Second Lieutenant	Air Force	May 6, 1994
First Lieutenant	Air Force	July 10, 1996
Captain	Air Force	July 10, 1998
Major	Air Force	January 1, 2005
Lieutenant Colonel	Air Force	March 1, 2009
Colonel	Air Force	October 1, 2014
Brigadier General	Air Force	November 1, 2019
Brigadier General	Space Force	May 10, 2021
Major General	Space Force	December 6, 2023

== Writings ==
- With John W. Raymond (February 2008). "People Who Impact Warfare with Space Capabilities" (PDF). High Frontier: The Journal for Space & Missile Professionals. IV (2): 23–28. Archived from the original (PDF) on November 17, 2016.
- "A Warrior's Mindset:Key to Winning in Space" (PDF).
- Space Launch Operations and the Lean Aerospace Initiative (PDF) (M.S.). Air Force Institute of Technology. 1999. Archived (PDF) from the original on August 12, 2021.

Military offices
Preceded by David N. Miller	Commander of the 21st Operations Group; 2015–2017	Succeeded by Devin Pepper
Preceded by ???	Executive Officer to the Commander of the Air Force Space Command; 2017–2018	Succeeded by Thomas G. Falzarano
Preceded by David N. Miller	Commander of the 460th Space Wing; 2018–2019	Succeeded by Devin Pepper
Preceded by Michele C. Edmondson	Director for Space Policy of the National Security Council; 2019–2021	Succeeded by Audrey Schaffer
Preceded by David N. Miller	Assistant Deputy Chief of Space Operations for Operations, Cyber, and Nuclear; 2021–2023	Succeeded by James E. Smith
Preceded by David N. Miller	Director of Global Space Operations of the United States Space Command; 2023–2025	Succeeded by Anthony Mastalir
Preceded by James E. Smith	Vice Director of Joint Force Development of the Joint Staff; 2025	Succeeded by Shay Warakomski
