= Devin Pepper =

U.S. Space Force general

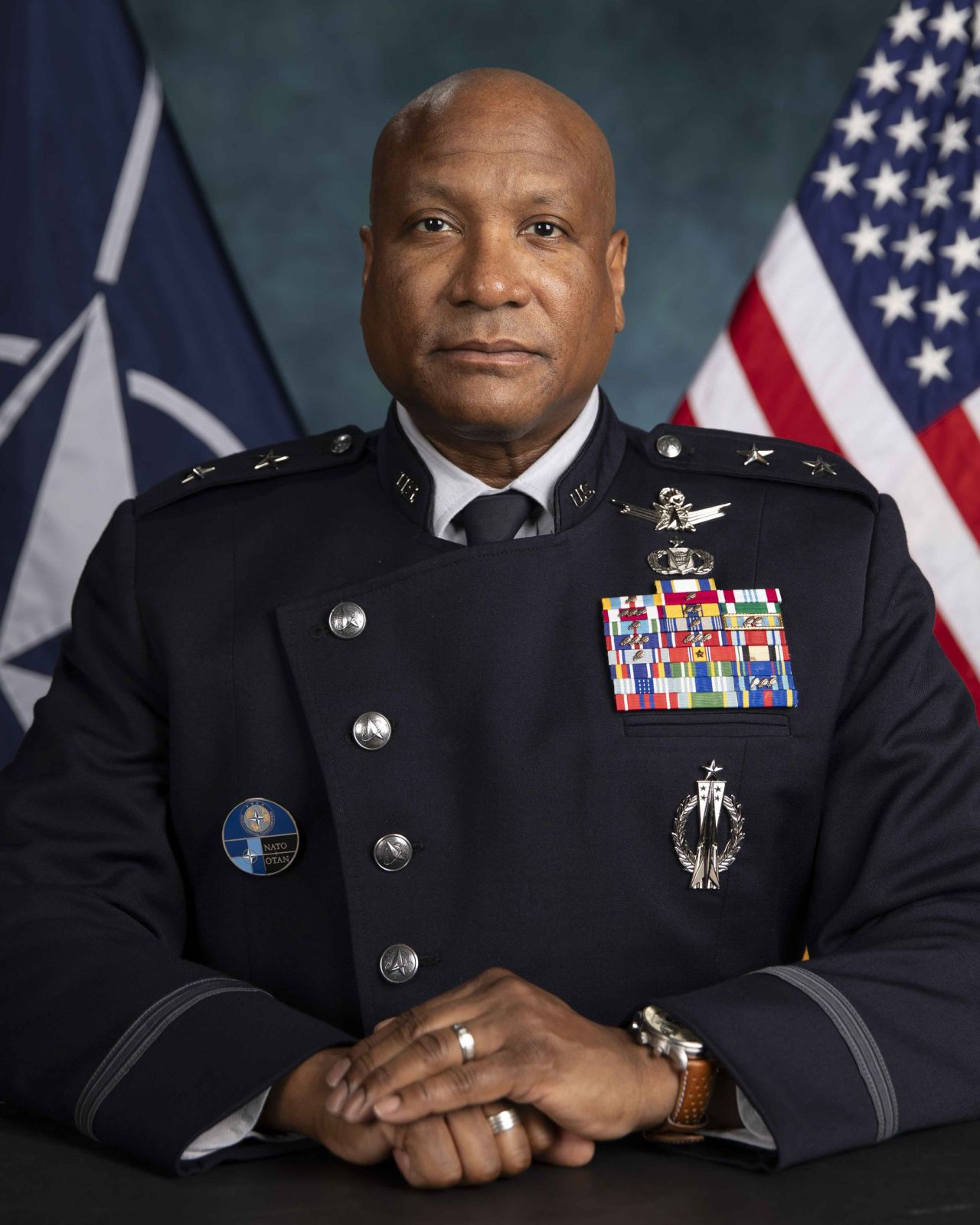
- Official portrait, 2026
- Born: November 29, 1969 (age 56)
- Education: University of Maryland, College Park (BS): George Washington University (MA); Embry–Riddle Aeronautical University (MBA)
- Military career
- Allegiance: United States
- Branch: United States Air Force: United States Space Force
- Service years: 1986–2021 (Air Force): 2021–2026 (Space Force)
- Rank: Major General
- Commands: Buckley Garrison: 460th Space Wing; 21st Operations Group; Air Force Element Operations Squadron, RAF Menwith Hill
- Awards: Defense Superior Service Medal (2): Legion of Merit (2)

Devin Ruben Pepper (born November 29, 1969) is a retired United States Space Force major general who served as commander of Buckley Garrison, 460th Space Wing, and the 21st Operations Group. He is the first African American general officer in the Space Force and the first one to have enlisted before commissioning as an officer.Pepper officially retired on June 8, 2026 as Major General Devin R Pepper. A retirement ceremony was held at The Nauticus in Norfolk VA.

== Education ==
- 1995 Bachelor of Science, Psychology, University of Maryland University College, College Park
- 2001 Squadron Officer School, Maxwell Air Force Base, Ala.
- 2002 Air Force Strategic Policy Intern, the Pentagon, Arlington, Va.
- 2002 Masters of Arts, Organizational Behavior and Leadership, The George Washington University, Washington, D.C.
- 2003 Masters of Business Administration, Embry-Riddle Aeronautical University, Daytona Beach, Fla.
- 2003 United States Air Force Weapons Instructor Course, Space Superiority Squadron, Nellis AFB, Nev.
- 2007 Air Command and Staff College, Maxwell AFB, Ala., by correspondence
- 2010 Space 300, National Security Space Institute, Colorado Springs, Colo.
- 2013 Air War College, Maxwell AFB, Ala., by correspondence
- 2015 Masters of National Security Strategy, National War College, Fort Lesley J. McNair, Washington, D.C.
- 2018 Middle East and South Asia Course, Alan L. Freed Associates, Capitol Hill Club, Washington, D.C.
- 2021 Senior Leader Orientation Course, Air Force General Officer Management Office, Washington, D.C.

== Military career ==
In July 2024, Pepper was nominated for promotion to major general.

=== Assignments ===
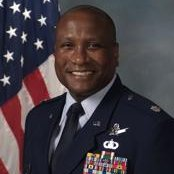
Pepper as a lieutenant colonel

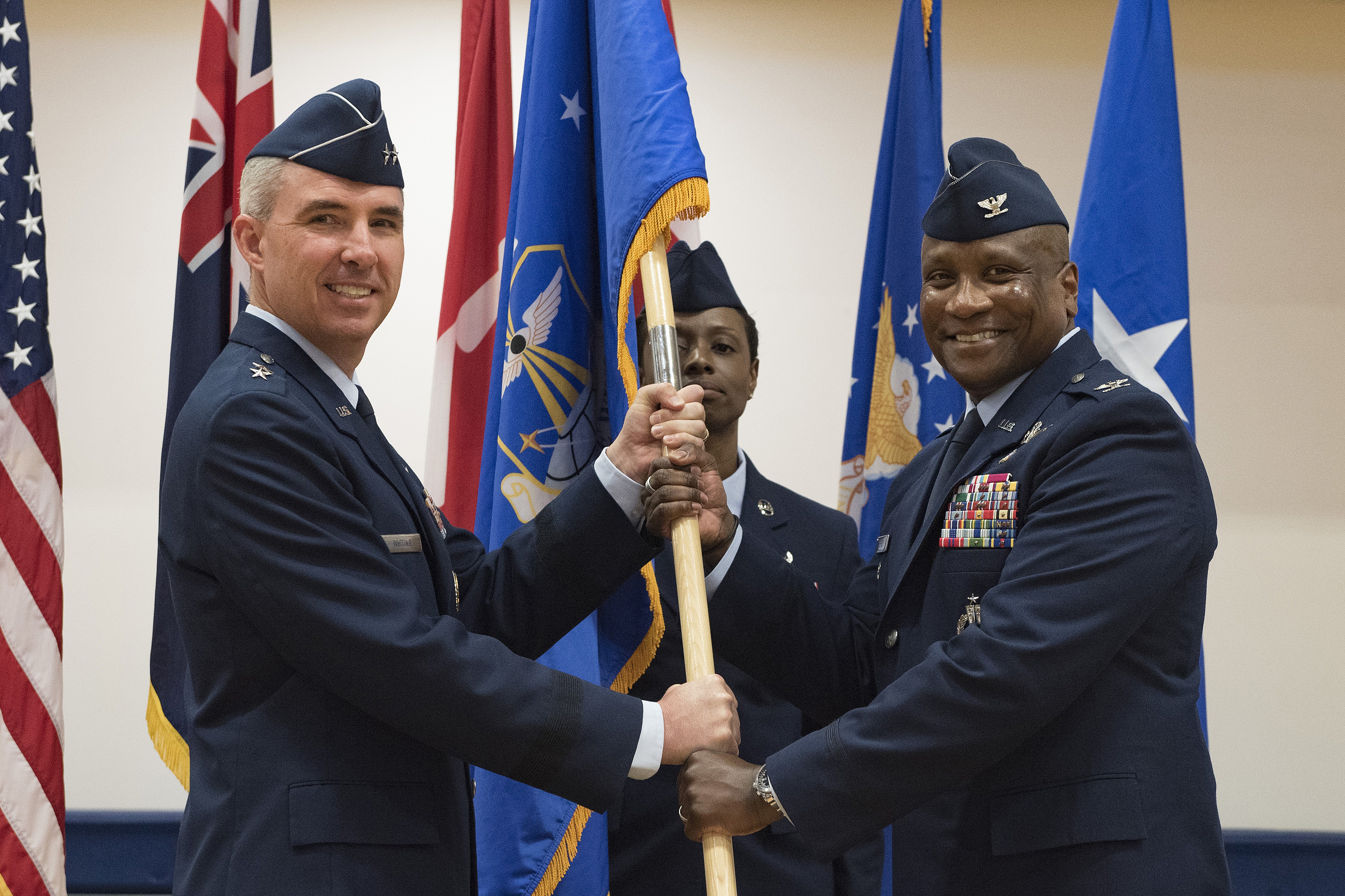
Pepper took command of the 460th Space Wing in 2019

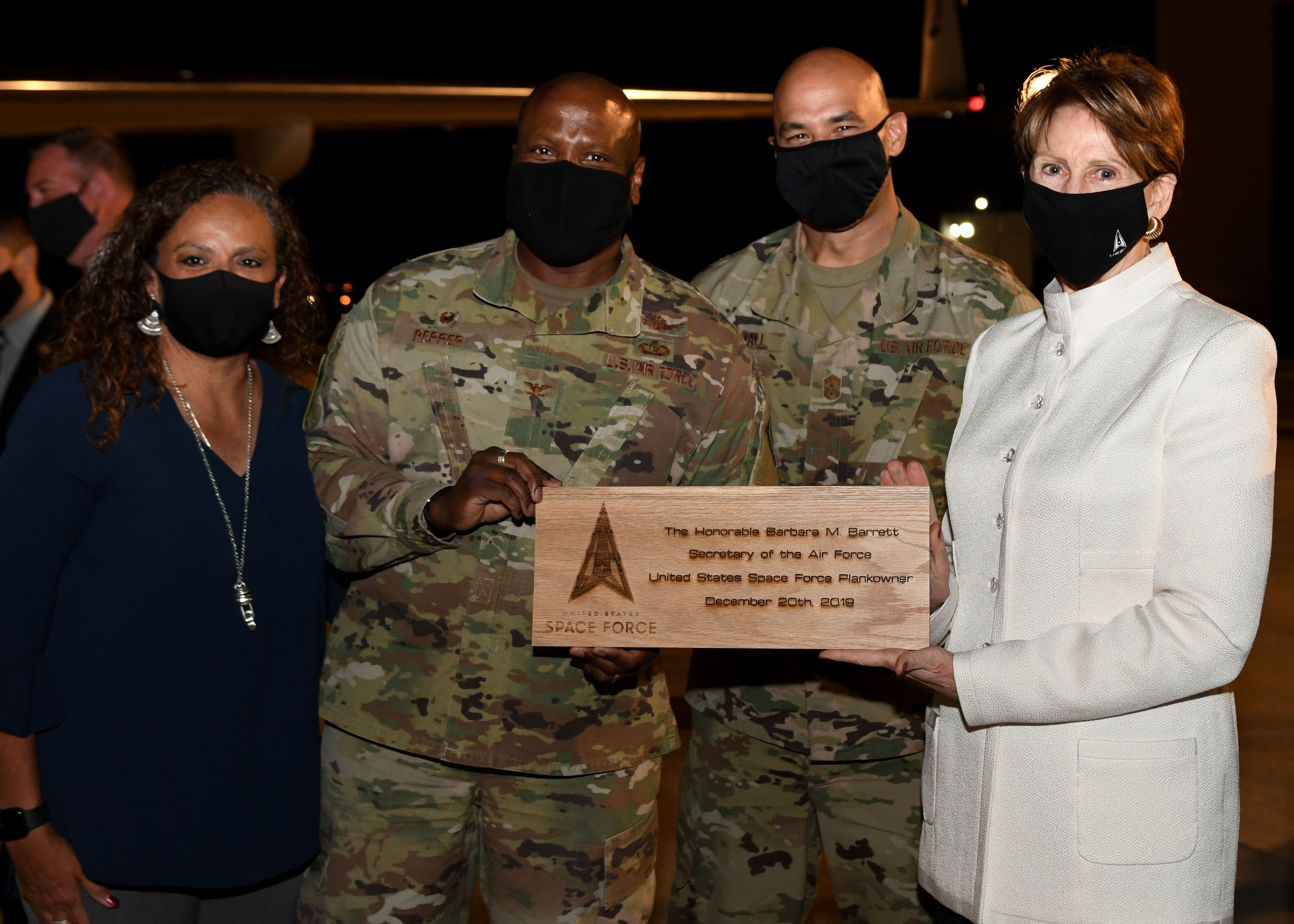
Pepper with Secretary Barrett during her visit to Buckley Air Force Base, 2020

1. May 1996–August 1996, Student, Officer Training School, Maxwell Air Force Base, Ala.
2. August 1996–April 1997, Student, Undergraduate Space and Missile Training and Initial Qualification Training, Minuteman III Rapid Execution and Combat Targeting, Vandenberg AFB, Calif.
3. April 1997–February 1998, Deputy Missile Combat Crew Commander, 740th Missile Squadron, Minot AFB, N.D.
4. February 1998–January 1999, Deputy Missile Combat Crew Commander Evaluator, 91st Operations Group, Minot AFB, N.D.
5. February 1999–November 1999, Missile Combat Crew Commander, 740th Missile Squadron, Minot AFB, N.D.
6. November 1999–July 2001, Missile Combat Crew Commander Instructor, Section Chief and Senior Crew Operations Instructor, 91st Operations Support Squadron, Minot AFB, N.D.
7. August 2001–June 2002, Executive Officer to the Wing Commander, 91st Space Wing, Minot AFB, N.D.
8. June 2002–June 2003, Air Force Strategic Policy Intern with duties in the Office of the Assistant Secretary of the Air Force for Equal Opportunity; and Office of the Deputy Secretary of Defense, the Pentagon, Arlington, Va.
9. January 2004–February 2005, Chief, Offensive Counter-Information, 7th Information Warfare Flight, Osan Air Base, South Korea
10. February 2005–September 2007, Program Manager, Advanced Strike Requirements Branch, Advanced Programs Division, Directorate of Requirements, Air Combat Command, Langley AFB, Va. (March – July 2007, Space Weapons Officer, G-3 Fires and Effects Coordination Cell, II Marine Expeditionary Force (Forward), Camp Fallujah, Iraq)
11. September 2007–August 2009, Executive Officer to the Commander, Eighth Air Force, Barksdale AFB, La.
12. September 2009–June 2011, Deputy Chief, later Chief, Weapons, Tactics and Electronic Warfare Branch, Air Force Global Strike Command, Barksdale AFB, La.
13. June 2011–June 2013, Commander, Air Force Element Operations Squadron, Royal Air Force Menwith Hill, United Kingdom
14. June 2013–July 2014, Deputy Commander, 21st Operations Group, 21st Space Wing, Peterson AFB, Colo.
15. August 2014–June 2015, Student, National War College, National Defense University, Fort Lesley J. McNair, Washington, D.C.
16. July 2015–June 2016, Chief, Global Intelligence Surveillance, and Reconnaissance Future Capabilities Branch (J841), U.S. Strategic Command, Offutt AFB, Neb.
17. June 2016–May 2017, Chief, Space and Missile Defense Division (J31), Headquarters United States Strategic Command, Offutt AFB, Neb.
18. May 2017–May 2019, Commander, 21st Operations Group, 21st Space Wing, Peterson AFB, Colo.
19. May 2019–July 2020, Commander, 460th Space Wing, Buckley AFB, Colo.
20. July 2020–January 2021, Commander, Buckley Garrison, Buckley AFB, Colo.
21. January 2021–April 2021, performing the duties of the Deputy Director of the Strategy, Plans and Policy Directorate (DJ5), Headquarters United States Space Command, Peterson AFB, Colo.
22. April 2021–October 2022, Deputy Director of the Strategy, Plans and Policy Directorate (DJ5), Headquarters United States Space Command, Peterson AFB, Colo.
23. October 2022–June 2024, Deputy Commanding General Operations, Headquarters Space Operations Command, Peterson SFB, Colo. (December 2022–June 2024) Vice Commander, Headquarters Space Operations Command, Peterson SFB, Colo.
23. June 2024–June 2026, Deputy Chief of Staff, Strategy, Plans and Policy, Allied Command Transformation, Norfolk, Virginia

== Awards and decorations ==
Pepper is the recipient of the following awards:

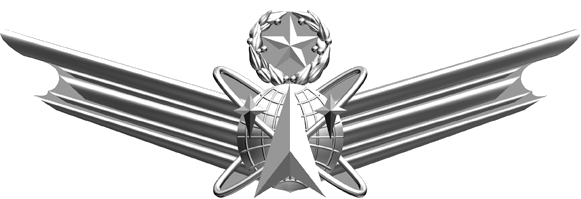
Command Space Operations Badge

Senior Command and Control Badge

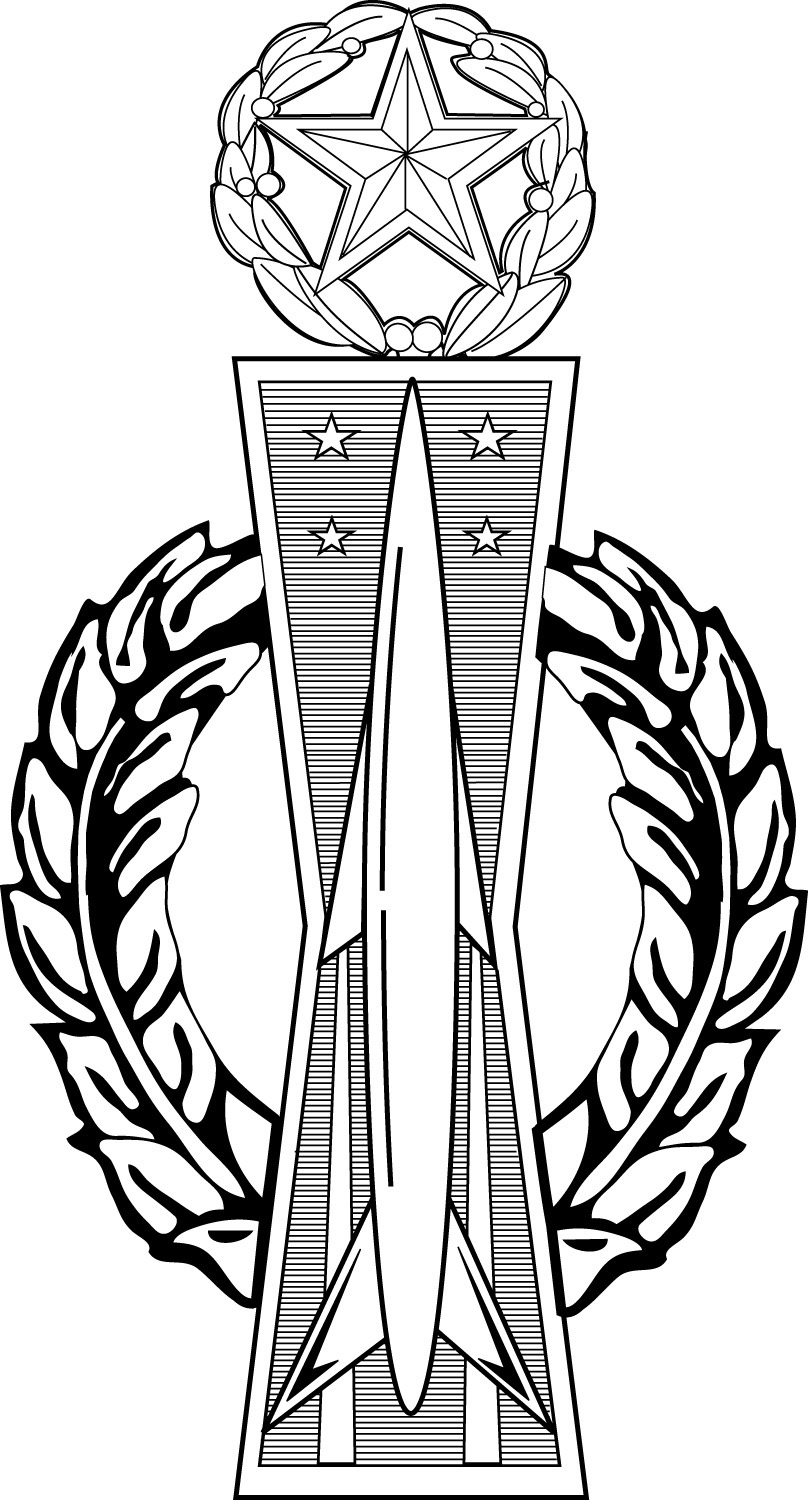

Master Missile Operations Badge

United States Space Command Badge

Defense Superior Service Medal with one bronze oak leaf cluster
Legion of Merit with one bronze oak leaf cluster
Defense Meritorious Service Medal
Meritorious Service Medal with three bronze oak leaf clusters
Air Force Commendation Medal with two bronze oak leaf clusters
Navy Commendation Medal
Joint Service Achievement Medal with one bronze oak leaf cluster
Air Force Achievement Medal with one bronze oak leaf cluster
Air Force Outstanding Unit Award with three bronze oak leaf clusters
Air Force Organizational Excellence Award with three bronze oak leaf cluster
Combat Readiness Medal with one bronze oak leaf cluster
Good Conduct Medal with one bronze oak leaf cluster
National Defense Service Medal with one bronze service star
Iraq Campaign Medal with one bronze service star
Global War on Terrorism Service Medal
Korea Defense Service Medal
Nuclear Deterrence Operations Service Medal with "N" device and two bronze oak leaf clusters
Air Force Overseas Short Tour Service Ribbon
Air Force Overseas Long Tour Service Ribbon
Air Force Longevity Service Award with one silver and one bronze service star
Non-Commissioned Officer Professional Development Ribbon
Small Arms Expert Marksmanship Ribbon with one bronze service star
Air Force Training Ribbon with one bronze oak leaf cluster

- Colonel Dick Scobee Leadership Award (OTS)
- Distinguished Graduate (Minuteman III IQT)
- Air Force Space Command Instructor and Evaluator of the Year Award
- Air Force Space Command Crewmember Excellence Award
- United States Air Force Verne Orr Award

== Dates of promotion ==
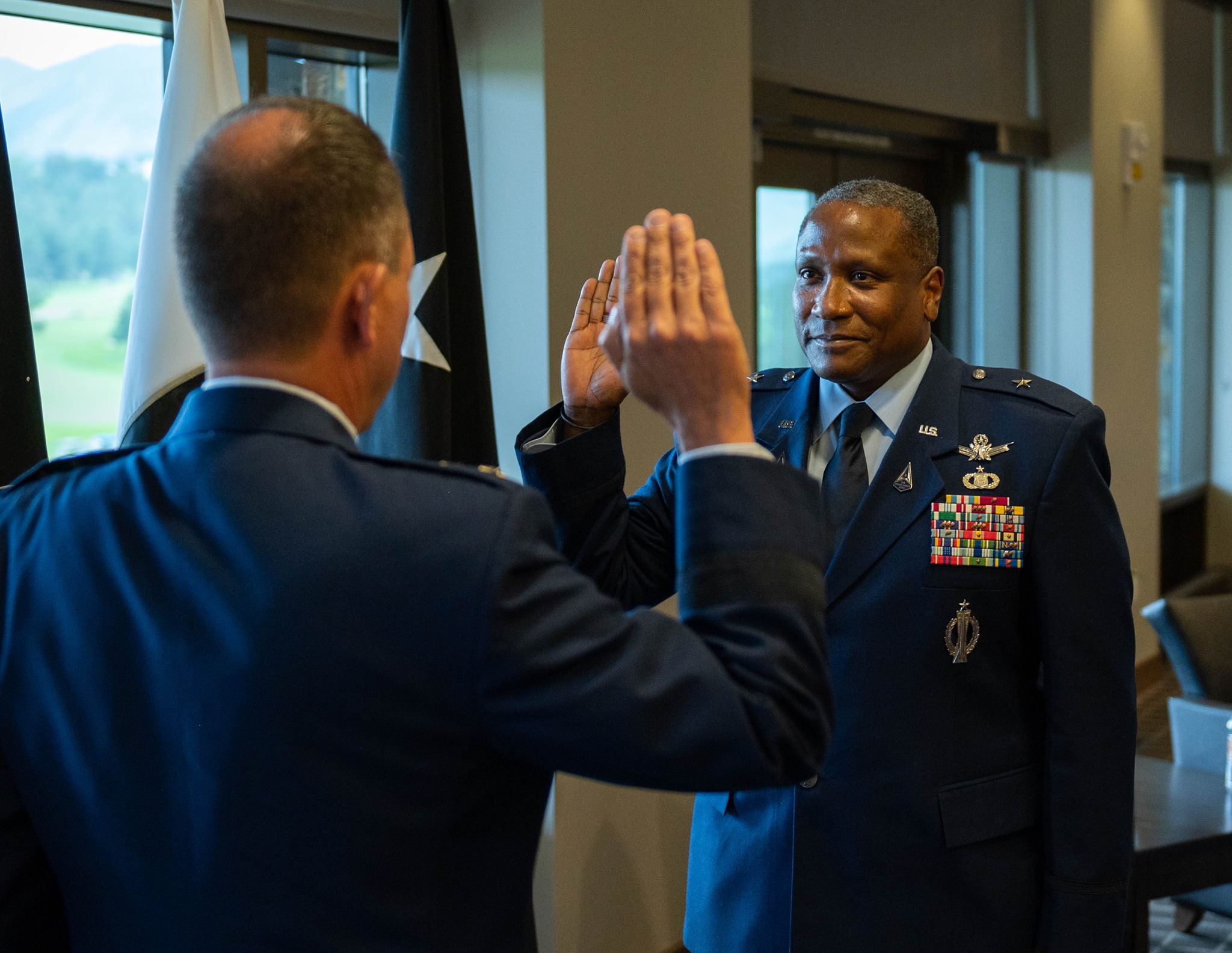
Lt Gen Shaw swears in Pepper during his promotion ceremony to brigadier general, August 16, 2021

Rank	Branch	Date
Second Lieutenant	Air Force	August 9, 1996
First Lieutenant	Air Force	August 9, 1998
Captain	Air Force	August 9, 2000
Major	Air Force	August 1, 2006
Lieutenant Colonel	Air Force	December 1, 2010
Colonel	Air Force	April 1, 2017
Colonel	Space Force	~September 30, 2020
Brigadier General	Space Force	September 2, 2022
Major General	Space Force	June 20, 2024

== Writing ==
- "A Dangerous Frontier: U.S. Space Command Adapts to Increasingly Complex Battleground". Indo-Pacific Defense Forum. March 22, 2022.

Military offices
Preceded by Troy L. Endicott	Commander of the 21st Operations Group; 2017–2019	Succeeded by Matthew S. Cantore
Preceded by Troy L. Endicott	Commander of the 460th Space Wing; 2019–2020	Command inactivated
New office	Commander of Buckley Garrison; 2020–2021	Succeeded by Brian C. Chellgren; Acting
Preceded by Richard Zellmann	Deputy Director of Strategy, Plans, and Policy of the United States Space Command; 2021–2022	Succeeded by Traci Kueker-Murphy
Preceded by Douglas Schiess	Deputy Commanding General (Operations) of Space Operations Command; 2022–2024	Succeeded by Chandler Atwood
Preceded by Douglas Schiess	Vice Commander of Space Operations Command; 2023–2024	Succeeded by Chandler Atwood
Preceded by Joseph D'costa	Deputy Chief of Staff for Strategy, Plans, and Policy of Allied Command Transformation; 2024–2026	Vacant
