= 460th Space Wing =

Inactive United States Air Force wing

460th Wing
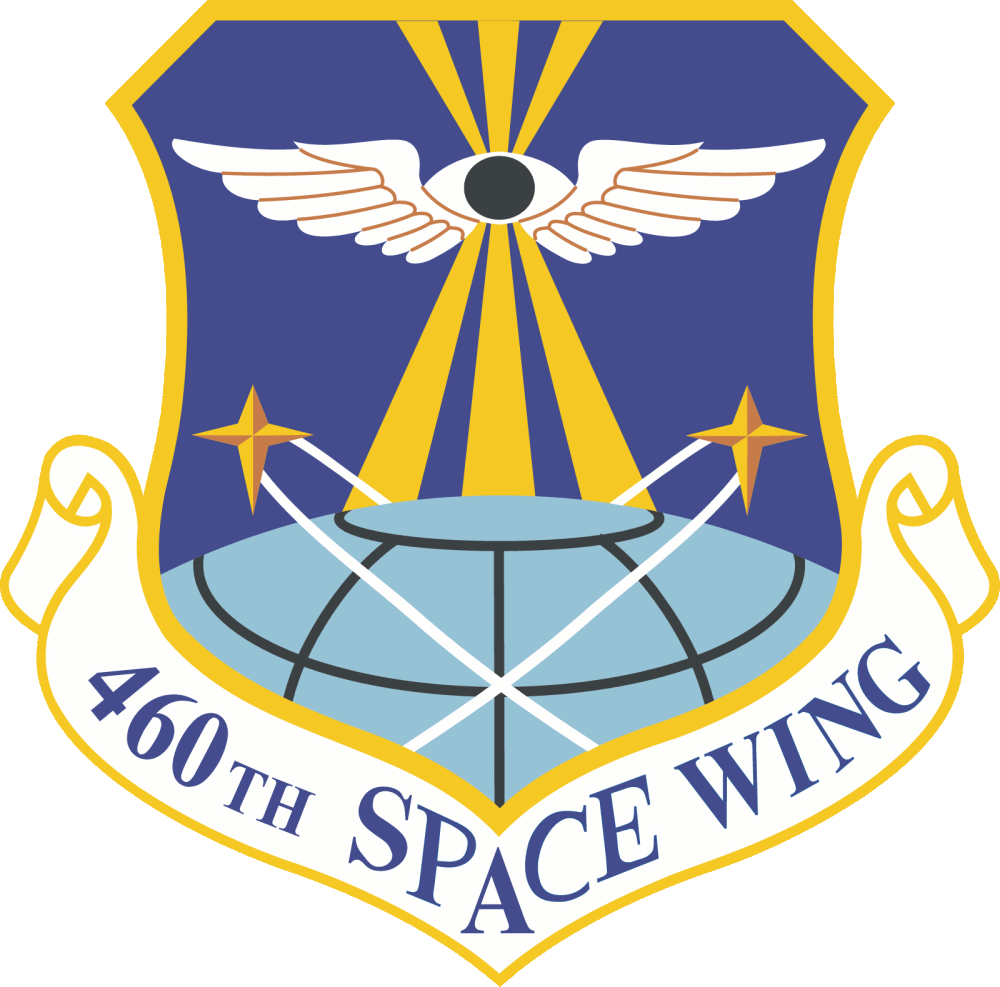
- Shield of the 460th Wing
- Active: 19 May 1943–24 July 2020
- Country: United States
- Branch: United States Air Force
- Type: Wing
- Engagements: World War II American Theater Rome-Arno; Southern France; Northern Apennines; Po Valley; Air Offensive, Europe; Normandy; Northern France; Rhineland; Central Europe; Air Combat, European-African-Middle East Theater Vietnam War Global war on terrorism

- Decorations: Distinguished Unit Citation Air Force Outstanding Unit Award with Valor Air Force Outstanding Unit Award Republic of Vietnam Gallantry Cross with Palm

The 460th Space Wing is an inactive wing of the United States Air Force. The 460th Space Wing was activated on 1 October 2001, replacing the 821st Space Group. It was inactivated on 24 July 2020 and replaced by the Buckley Garrison, later named Space Base Delta 2, to which its support units moved. The wing's operational units became Space Delta 4.

== Operations ==
The 460th Space Wing was the United States Space Force's space-based infrared surveillance, tracking, and missile warning wing. The 460th Space Wing operated the Space-Based Infrared System (SBIRS) and the Defense Support Program (DSP).

The 50th Space Wing was also the host unit for Buckley Air Force Base, providing base support for the Colorado Air National Guard's 140th Wing, the Navy's Operational Support Center Denver, the National Reconnaissance Office's Aerospace Data Facility-Colorado, the Army's Aviation Support Facility, and the Air Force's Air Reserve Personnel Center.

== Structure in 2020 ==
460th Operations Group (460 OG)

- 460th Cyber Squadron (460 CS)
- 2nd Space Warning Squadron (2 SWS)
- 11th Space Warning Squadron (11 SWS)
- 460th Operations Support Squadron (460 OSS)
- 460th Space Communications Squadron (460 SCS)

460th Mission Support Group (460 MSG)

- 460th Civil Engineer Squadron (460 CES)
- 460th Contracting Flight (460 CONF)
- 460th Force Support Squadron (460 FSS)
- 460th Logistics Readiness Squadron (460 LRS)
- 460th Security Forces Squadron (460 SFS)

460th Medical Group (460 MDG)

- 460th Healthcare Operations Squadron (460 HCOS)
- 460th Operational Medical Readiness Squadron (460 OMRS)

460th Comptroller Squadron (460 CPTS)

== History ==
=== 460th Bombardment Group ===
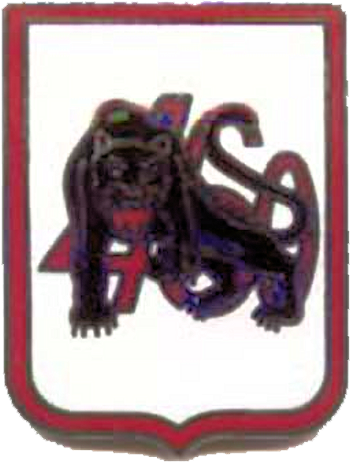
460th Bombardment Group emblem

The 460th Bombardment Group (Heavy), was activated at Alamogordo Army Air Field, New Mexico on 1 July 1943, with the 760th, 761st, 762d, and 763d Bombardment Squadrons assigned. A cadre of the unit's air echelon went to Orlando Army Air Base, Florida for specialized training with the Army Air Forces School of Applied Tactics. In August, the unit was filled out with ground personnel at Kearns Army Air Base, Utah, then moved to Chatham Army Air Field, Georgia to complete its training with Consolidated B-24 Liberator heavy bombers. Upon completing training, the squadron departed for the Mediterranean Theater of Operations in January 1944.

The group completed its deployment to Spinazzola Airfield, Italy by the middle of February 1944, and entered the strategic bombing campaign against Germany the following month, with an attack on a marshalling yard and docks at Metković, Yugoslavia. It attacked oil refineries and storage facilities, railroads, industrial areas, including aircraft manufacturing plants in Austria, Czechoslovakia, France, Germany, Greece, Hungary, Italy, Romania and Yugoslavia.

On 26 July 1944, group formation led the 55th Bombardment Wing on an attack against an airfield and aircraft manufacturing plant at Zwolfaxing, Austria. It attacked the target through heavy enemy flak and adverse weather, for which it was awarded a Distinguished Unit Citation.

The group was occasionally diverted from the strategic bombing mission to perform air interdiction and close air support missions. In August 1944, it supported Operation Dragoon, the invasion of southern France by attacking submarine pens, marshalling yards and artillery batteries in the area of the amphibious landings. It struck lines of communications, railroads, ammunition dumps and other targets in connection with Operation Grapeshot, the allied offensive in Northern Italy. The 460th was redesignated as the 460th Bombardment Group, Heavy on 3 September 1944. The group flew its last mission against a target in northern Italy on 26 April 1945.

After V-E Day, the 460th Bombardment Group and its squadrons were transferred to the South Atlantic Division, Air Transport Command, moving to Parnamirim Field, near Natal, Brazil to participate in the Green Project. Green Project was aimed at transporting 50,000 military personnel a month from the European and Mediterranean Theaters back to the United States, with priority for those that plans called for redeploying to the Pacific. The 460th Bombardment Group was inactivated on 26 September 1945.

=== 460th Tactical Reconnaissance Wing ===
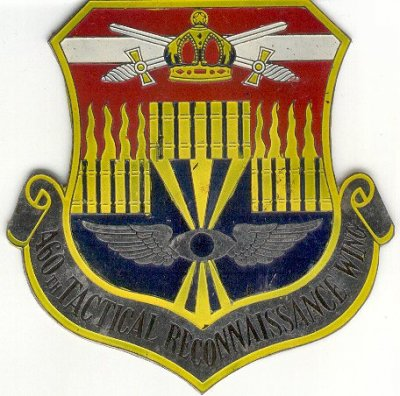
Shield of the 460th Tactical Reconnaissance Wing

On 18 February 1966, the 460th Tactical Reconnaissance Wing was organized and entered the Vietnam War. It supported 2d Air Division and the Military Assistance Command Vietnam (MACV).

When it stood up, the 460th TRW, alone, was responsible for the entire reconnaissance mission, both visual and electronic reconnaissance, throughout the Southeast Asia (SEA) area of responsibility. On 18 February 1966 the 460th TRW began with 74 aircraft of various types. By the end of June 1966, that number climbed to over 200 aircraft. On 15 October 1966, the 460th TRW assumed responsibilities for all depot-level aircraft maintenance responsibility for all USAF organizations in South Vietnam.

Toward the end of 1966, the 460th TRW's responsibilities changed. First, on 18 September 1966, the 432d Tactical Reconnaissance Wing was activated at Takhli Royal Thai Air Force Base, Thailand. After the 432d TRW activated it took control of the reconnaissance squadrons in Thailand, and the 460th TRW was no longer responsible for all air reconnaissance missions throughout SEA. However, the 460th TRW provided the new 432d TRW with continued support in recovering McDonnell RF-101 Voodoo and McDonnell RF-4C Phantom II aircraft returning from high priority, high interest target missions.

Being one of two reconnaissance wings supporting SEA there were few military operations that did not involve the wing. Not only did the 460th TRW provide electronic and photo reconnaissance, the Wing's electronic capabilities allowed it to provide electronic counter measure support to Boeing B-52 Stratofortresses returning from striking targets in North Vietnam. The Wing even gave support to the Cambodian military against the North Vietnam and Viet Cong forces, as well as support to U.S. units operating inside Cambodia.

As the Vietnamization Improvement and Modernization Program began, Vietnamese crews began flying with Douglas EC-47 crews from the 360th Tactical Electronic Warfare Squadron and 6994th Security Squadron on 8 May 1971, to get training on operating the aircraft and its systems. The wing was inactivated on 31 August 1971.

=== 460th Tactical Reconnaissance Group ===
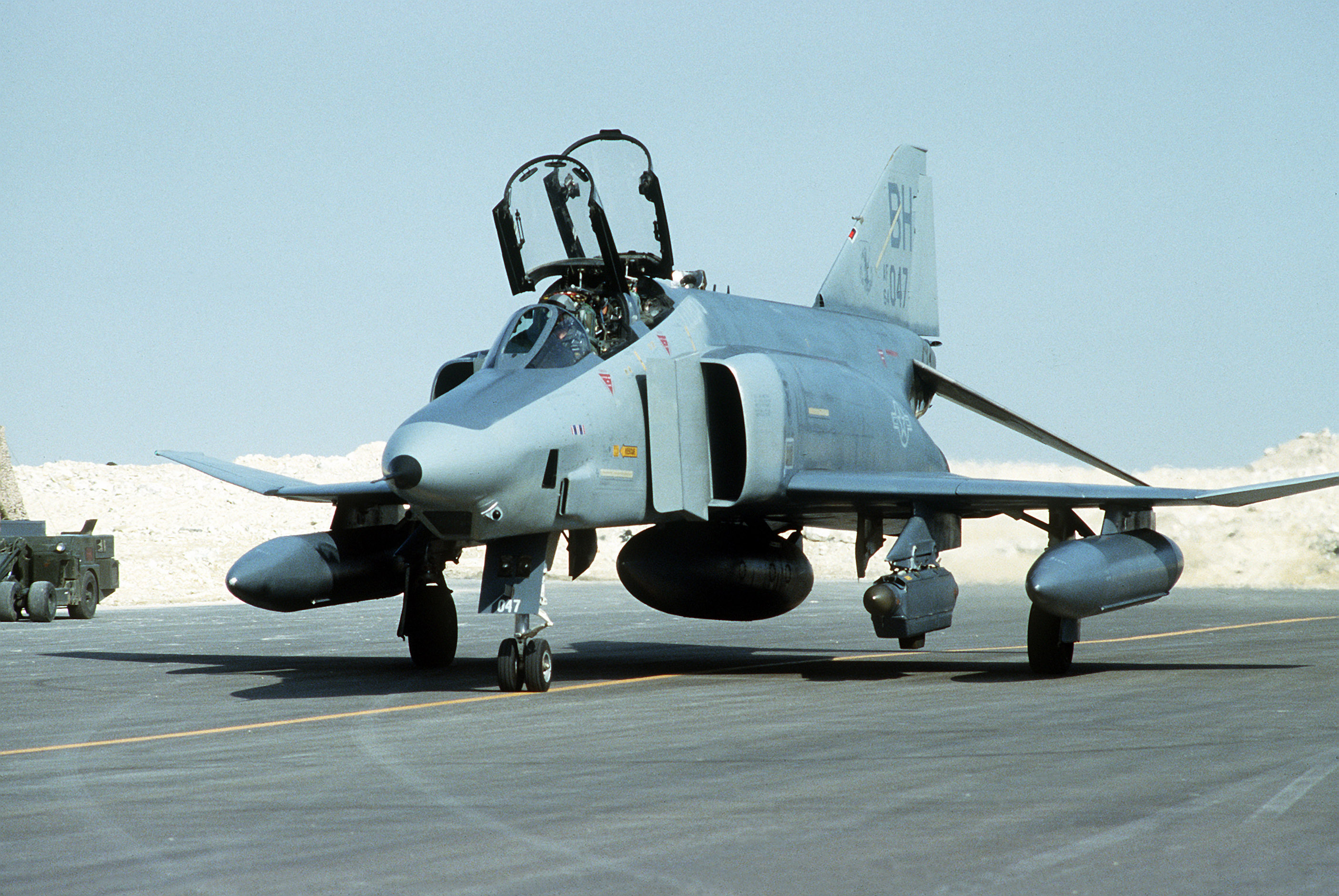
The 460th Tactical Reconnaissance Group flew RF-4C Phantom IIs in 1990

In January 1984, the 460th Tactical Reconnaissance Wing and 460th Bombardment Group were consolidated into a single unit. On 19 September 1989 it was redesignated the 460th Tactical Reconnaissance Group, and on 1 October 1989, reactivated at Taegu Air Base, South Korea. Behind this activation was Pacific Air Forces's (PACAF) portion of Phase II of an Air Staff programming plan, Commando Flash.

Activating the 460th and relocating the 15th Tactical Reconnaissance Squadron with its RF-4C Phantom IIs from Kadena Air Base, Japan to Taegu accomplished several PACAF objectives. This activation maintained Taegu as a main operating base, allowed the RF-4C crews to train in their actual wartime operating area, placed reconnaissance aircraft near North Korea, and reduced the temporary duty costs for PACAF. Upon its activation, the 460th reported directly to 7th Air Force. During its time at Taegu, the group participated in several local and PACAF exercises designed to maintain the readiness of US forces stationed around the Korean demilitarized zone and other units designated as support units should North Korea invade South Korea again.

A year later, 1 October 1990, the 460th was inactivated along with the 15th Squadron. Some of the group's subordinate units remained active after the group's inactivation. The 460th Consolidated Aircraft Maintenance Squadron remained active until 15 October 1990. On 1 July 1991, the 460th Combat Support Squadron finally inactivated.

=== 460th Space Wing ===
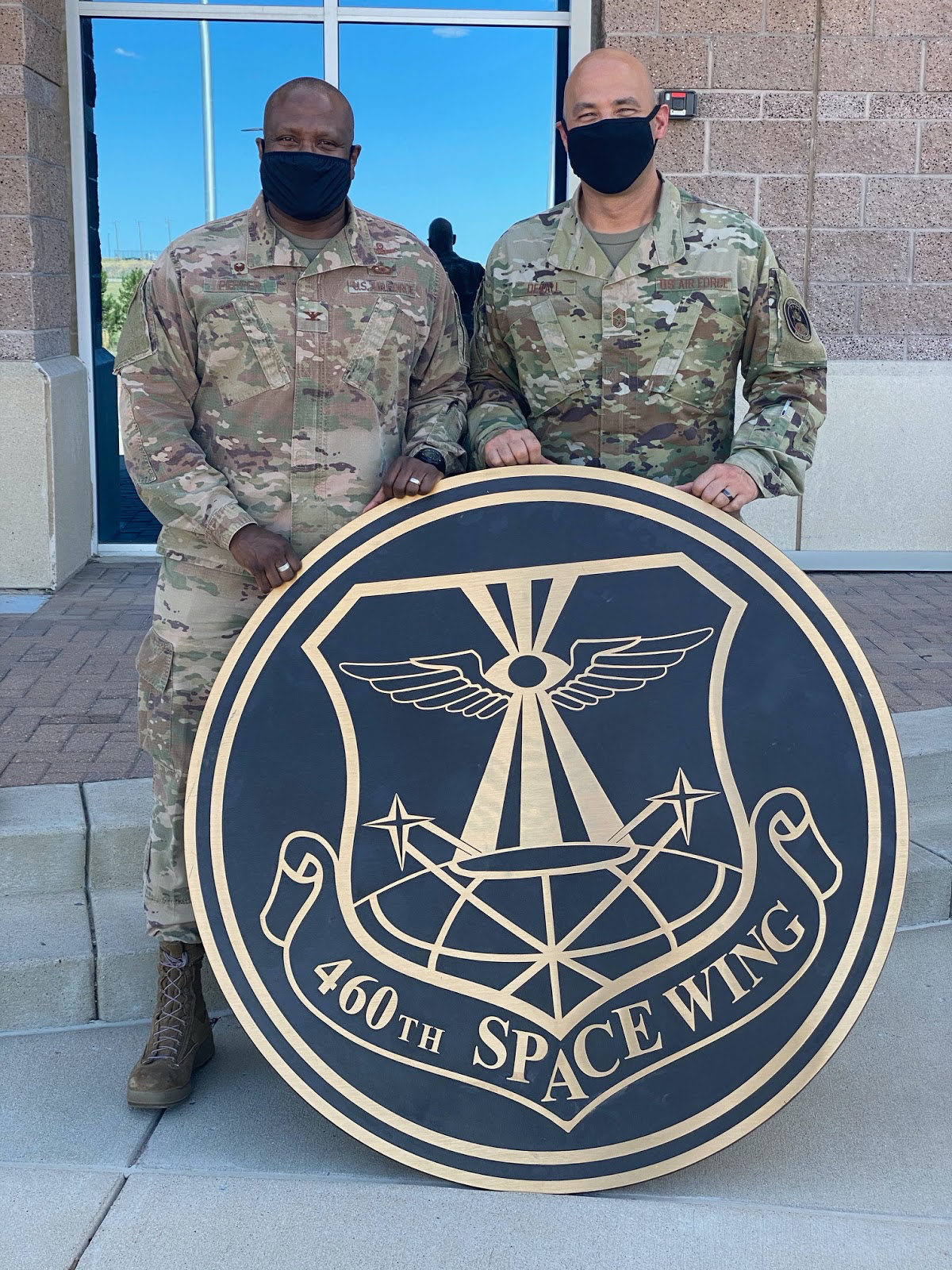
Removal of the 460th Space Wing sign after its deactivation, 7 August 2020.

On 1 October 2000, the United States Air Force assumed control of the former Buckley Air National Guard Base and assigned it to the 821st Space Group to oversee its operations. On 1 October 2001, the 460th Air Base Wing was reactivated to assume installation support responsibilities for what became Buckley Air Force Base.

Under the 460th ABW's command, the base underwent an extensive modernization program to improve the base's support facilities. The 460th ABW oversaw construction of one of the largest Defense Commissary Agency base commissary and Army and Air Force Exchange Service base exchange complexes in the Air Force, as well as a fitness center, dorms, and other housing areas for Buckley Airmen.

On 19 August 2004, the wing was redesignated as the 460th Space Wing. It assumed command of the base's satellite missile warning mission from the 21st Space Wing, while retaining installation host and support functions. From 2004-2019 the wing provided global infrared surveillance, tracking and missile warning for theater and homeland defense functions, and dispatched air force personnel for overseas service.

On 20 December 2019, the 460th Space Wing, along with the rest of Air Force Space Command, were transferred into the United States Space Force.

== Lineage ==
460th Bombardment Group

- Established as 460th Bombardment Group (Heavy) on 19 May 1943

Activated on 1 July 1943

Redesignated 460th Bombardment Group, Heavy c. 3 September 1944

Inactivated on 26 September 1945

- Consolidated with the 460th Tactical Reconnaissance Wing as the 460th Tactical Reconnaissance Wing on 31 January 1984

460th Space Wing

- Established as the 460th Tactical Reconnaissance Wing and activated on 2 February 1966 (not organized)

Organized on 18 February 1966

Inactivated on 31 August 1971

- Consolidated with the 460th Bombardment Group on 31 January 1984
- Redesignated 460th Tactical Reconnaissance Group on 19 September 1989

Activated on 1 October 1989

Inactivated on 1 October 1990

- Redesignated 460th Air Base Wing on 26 April 2001

Activated on 1 October 2001

Redesignated 460th Space Wing on 19 August 2004

=== Assignments ===
- II Bomber Command, 1 July 1943
- Second Air Force, 6 October 1943
- I Bomber Command, c. 29 October 1943
- 55th Bombardment Wing, c. 5 February 1944
- South Atlantic Division, Air Transport Command, 15 June-26 September 1945
- Pacific Air Forces, 2 February 1966 (not organized)
- 2d Air Division, 18 February 1966
- Seventh Air Force, 1 April 1966 – 31 August 1971
- Seventh Air Force, 1 October 1989 – 1 October 1990
- Fourteenth Air Force, 1 October 2001 – present

=== Components ===
Groups

- 460th Operations Group: 19 August 2004 – present

Squadrons

- 12th Tactical Reconnaissance Squadron: 2 September 1966 – 31 August 1971
- 15th Tactical Reconnaissance Squadron: 1 October 1989 – 1 October 1990
- 16th Tactical Reconnaissance Squadron:18 February 1966 – 15 March 1970
- 20th Tactical Reconnaissance Squadron: 18 February – 18 September 1966
- 41st Tactical Reconnaissance Squadron: 18 February – 18 September 1966
- 45th Tactical Reconnaissance Squadron: attached 30 March – 7 July 1966
- 360th Reconnaissance Squadron (later 360th Tactical Electronic Warfare Squadron): 8 April 1966 – 31 August 1971
- 361st Reconnaissance Squadron (later 361st Tactical Electronic Warfare) Squadron): 8 April 1966 – 31 August 1971
- 362d Reconnaissance Squadron (later 362d Tactical Electronic Warfare) Squadron): 1 February 1967 – 31 August 1971
- 760th Bombardment Squadron: 1 July 1943 – 26 September 1945
- 761st Bombardment Squadron: 1 July 1943 – 26 September 1945
- 762d Bombardment Squadron: 1 July 1943 – 26 September 1945
- 763d Bombardment Squadron: 1 July 1943 – 26 September 1945
- 6460th Tactical Reconnaissance Squadron: 8 June – 18 September 1966
- 6461st Tactical Reconnaissance Squadron: 29 July – 18 September 1966.

== Commanders ==
No.	Commander		Term		
No.	Portrait	Name	Took office	Left office	Duration
1	Allen Kirkman Jr.	Colonel; Allen Kirkman Jr.	30 June 2003	20 June 2005	2 years, 0 days
2	David W. Zeigler	Colonel; David W. Zeigler	20 June 2005	12 June 2007	1 year, 347 days
3	Donald W. McGee Jr.	Colonel; Donald W. McGee Jr.	12 June 2007	19 June 2009	2 years, 7 days
4	Clinton E. Crosier	Colonel; Clinton E. Crosier	19 June 2009	11 July 2011	2 years, 22 days
5	Daniel A. Dant	Colonel; Daniel A. Dant	11 July 2011	28 June 2013	1 year, 352 days
6	Daniel D. Wright III	Colonel; Daniel D. Wright III	28 June 2013	12 June 2014	349 days
7	John W. Wagner	Colonel; John W. Wagner	12 June 2014	12 August 2016	2 years, 61 days
8	David N. Miller Jr.	Colonel; David N. Miller Jr.	12 August 2016	12 January 2018	1 year, 153 days
9	Troy L. Endicott	Colonel; Troy L. Endicott	12 January 2018	3 May 2019	1 year, 111 days
10	Devin R. Pepper	Colonel; Devin R. Pepper	3 May 2019	24 July 2020	7 years, 114 days

== See also ==
- 137th Space Warning Squadron (140th Wing)
- 516th Air Service Group World War II support organization for 460th Bombardment Group
- B-24 Liberator units of the United States Army Air Forces
- List of B-57 units of the United States Air Force
- List of Douglas C-47 Skytrain operators
