= Gold bar (disambiguation) =

A gold bar is a quantity of refined metallic gold in any shape.

Gold bar and Gold Bar may also refer to:

- Gold Bar, Edmonton, a residential neighbourhood in the Canadian city
  - Gold Bar Park, a park near the community
- Gold Bar, Washington, United States
- Gold Bar, a biscuit produced by UK food company McVitie's

== See also ==
- Gold Bar Recruiter, a newly-commissioned second lieutenant in the United States Army and United States Air Force ordered to a specific active duty
