= Temporary duty assignment =

U.S. Government Employee duty status designation

Temporary duty travel (TDY), also sometimes referred to as Temporary Additional Duty (TAD) in the US Navy and US Marine Corps, is a duty status designation reflecting a US Government Employee's official travel or assignment at a location other than the employee's permanent duty station. This type of secondment is usually of relatively short duration, typically from two to 189 days in length. Various Departments and Agencies within the US Federal Government have differing regulations governing the authorizations, allowances, and processing of TDY personnel. For Example, the Department of Defense uses the Joint Travel Regulations, while the Department of State and other foreign affairs agencies use the guidance in the Foreign Affairs Manual.

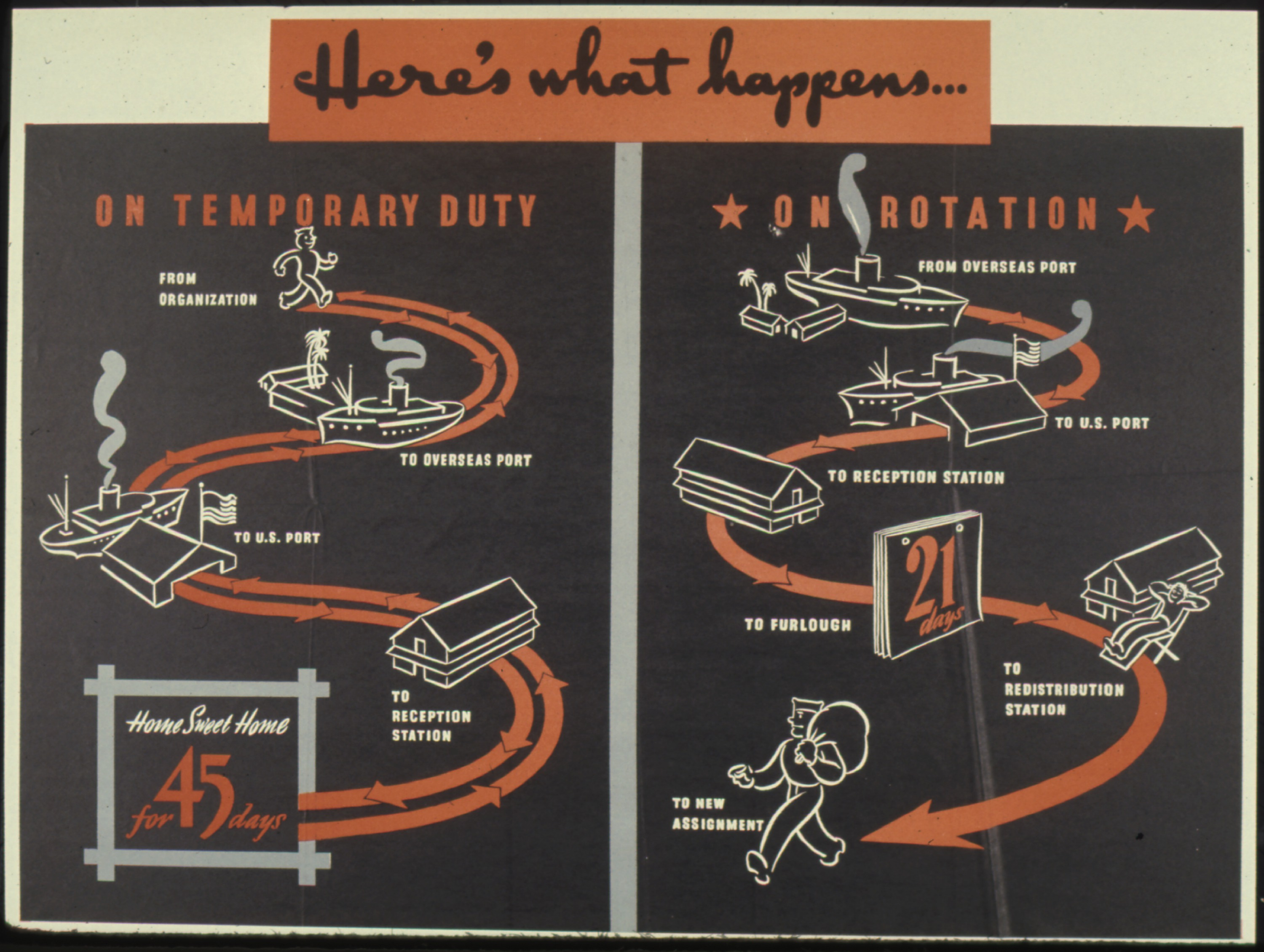
Temporary duty and rotation for US troops during World War II

Employees on TDY status are reimbursed for their expenses via a flat-rate per diem, based on location, covering meals, and incidental expenses (M&IE). Lodging is reimbursed on a cost-basis with a location-dependent cap. Domestic M&IE and Lodging rates are established by the General Services Administration while overseas rates are determined by the United States Department of State Office of Allowances.

Some locations have furnished apartments for long-term stay. These apartments have fully equipped kitchens so TDY recipients have the option to cook rather than always eat out, and some may have free washing machines and clothes dryers. Some government agencies consider any assignment over 45 days as an extended TDA, which allows the employee to be reimbursed for part of the expenses before the end of the assignment.

Examples of TDY assignments in the United States Army include attendance of newly commissioned officers at basic-branch Basic Officer Leaders Courses, and Gold Bar Recruiter duty in the interim; and training of all ranks at specialty-skill schools (e.g. United States Army Airborne School, United States Army Air Assault School, Army Mountain Warfare School) through their sponsoring commands. In the United States Air Force, temporary duty can be commonly approved by commanders for service at Civil Air Patrol basic encampments or other activities because it serves the organizational mission of recruitment and public affairs.
