= 2nd Range Operations Squadron =

U.S. Space Force unit

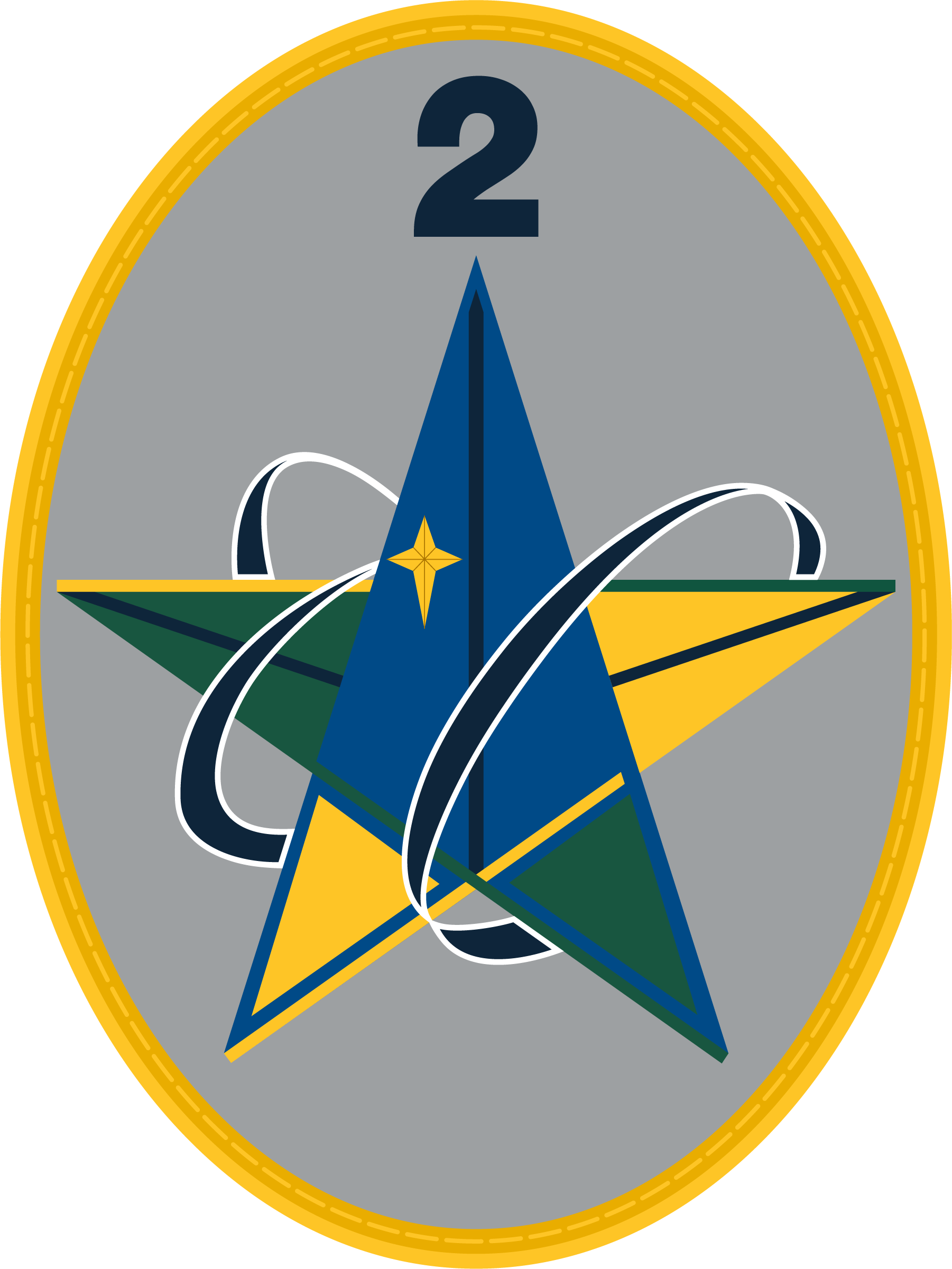
- 2 ROPS emblem

Commanders
- Commander: Lt Col Darin J. Lister
- Notable commanders: David N. Miller Jr.

Insignia
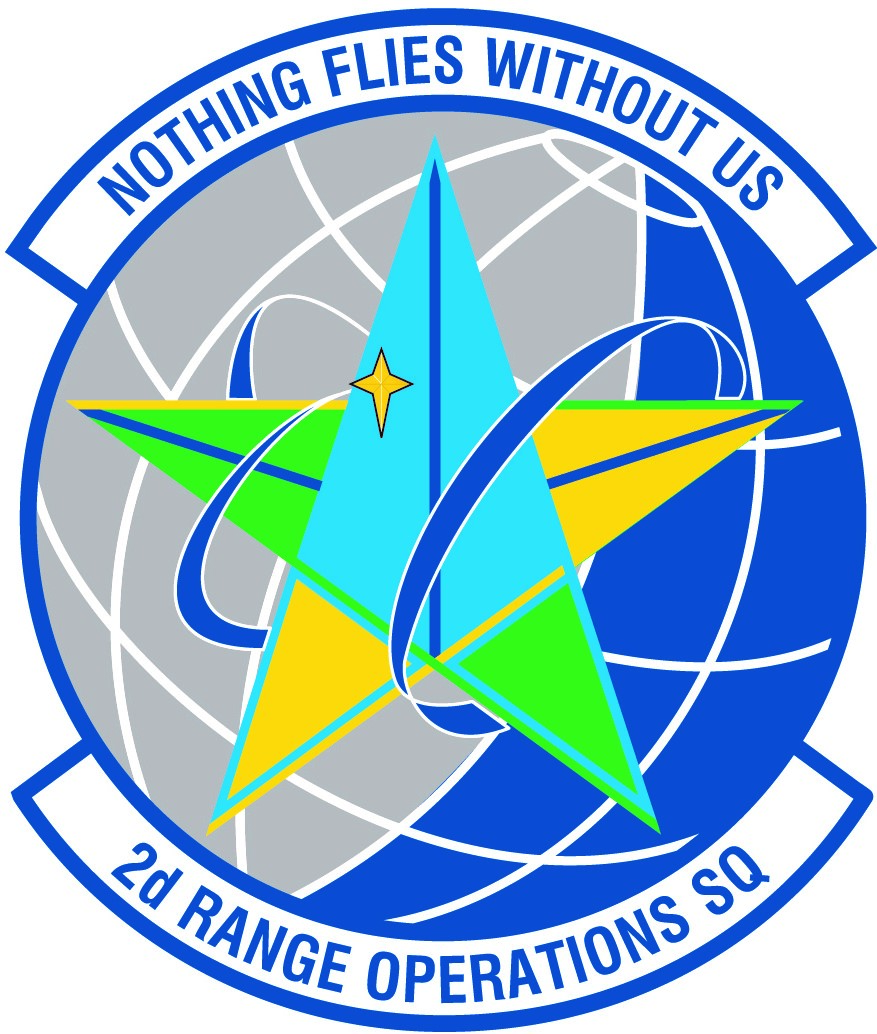
- Former 2nd Range Operations Squadron emblem

The 2nd Range Operations Squadron (2 ROPS) is a United States Space Force unit responsible for executing real-time command and control of the Western Range in support of spacelift operations, ballistic missile test and evaluation, and aeronautical test and evaluation. It is under Space Launch Delta 30 and headquartered at Vandenberg Space Force Base, California.

== List of commanders ==
- Lt Col Marcelino Del Rosario, ~2008
- Lt Col David N. Miller Jr., September 2009 – 1 June 2011
- Lt Col Burton H. Catledge, 1 June 2011 – ~2013
- Lt Col Jason Turner, ~2016
- Lt Col Nicholas M. Somerman, May 2021 – 8 June 2023
- Lt Col Darin J. Lister, 8 June 2023 – present

== See also ==
- Space Launch Delta 30
