= 460th Operations Support Squadron =

U.S. Space Force unit

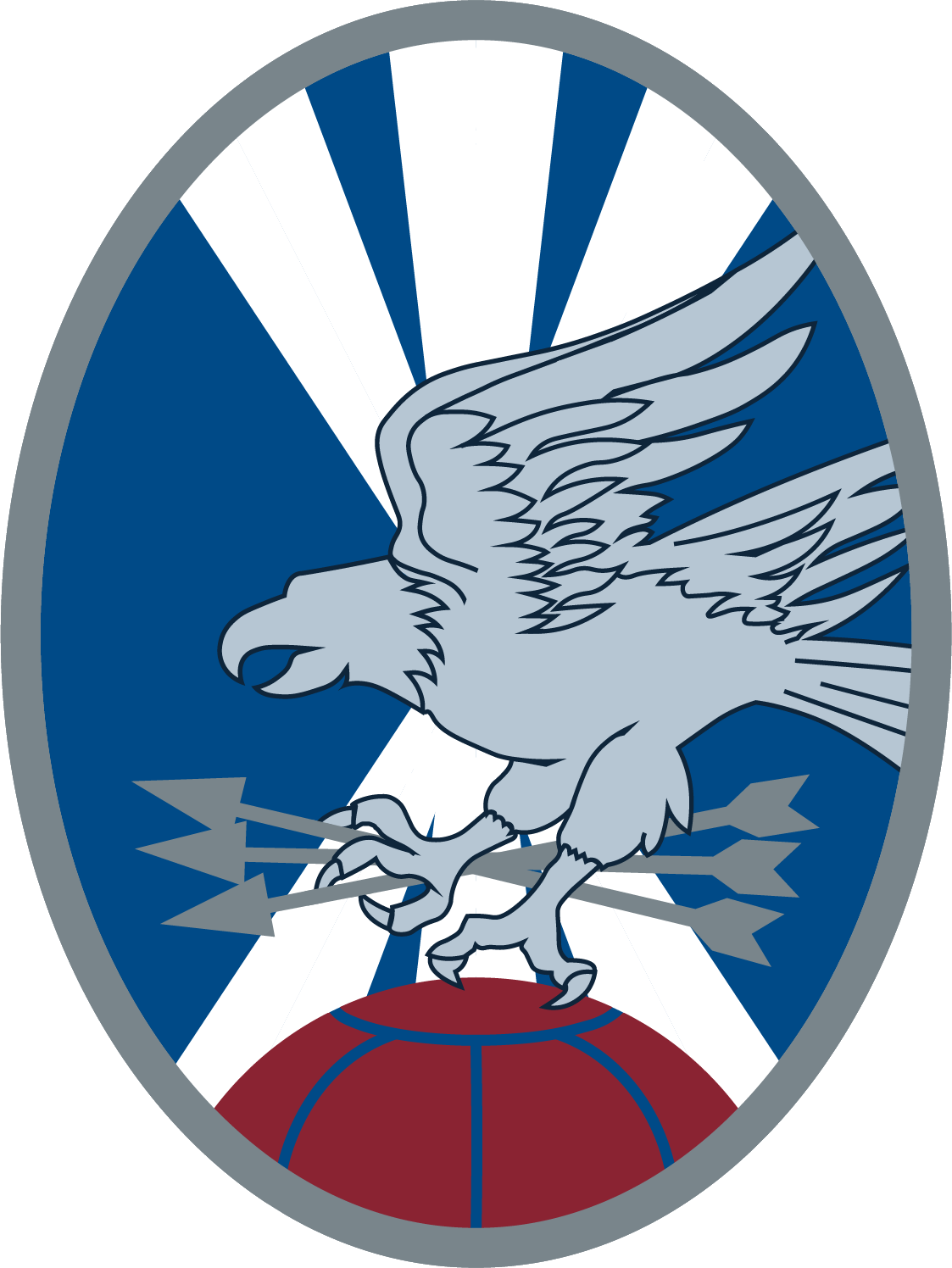
- Squadron emblem
- Active: 19 August 2004 – 11 March 2022
- Country: United States
- Branch: United States Space Force
- Type: Squadron
- Role: Operations support
- Part of: Space Delta 4
- Headquarters: Buckley Space Force Base, Colorado, U.S.

Insignia
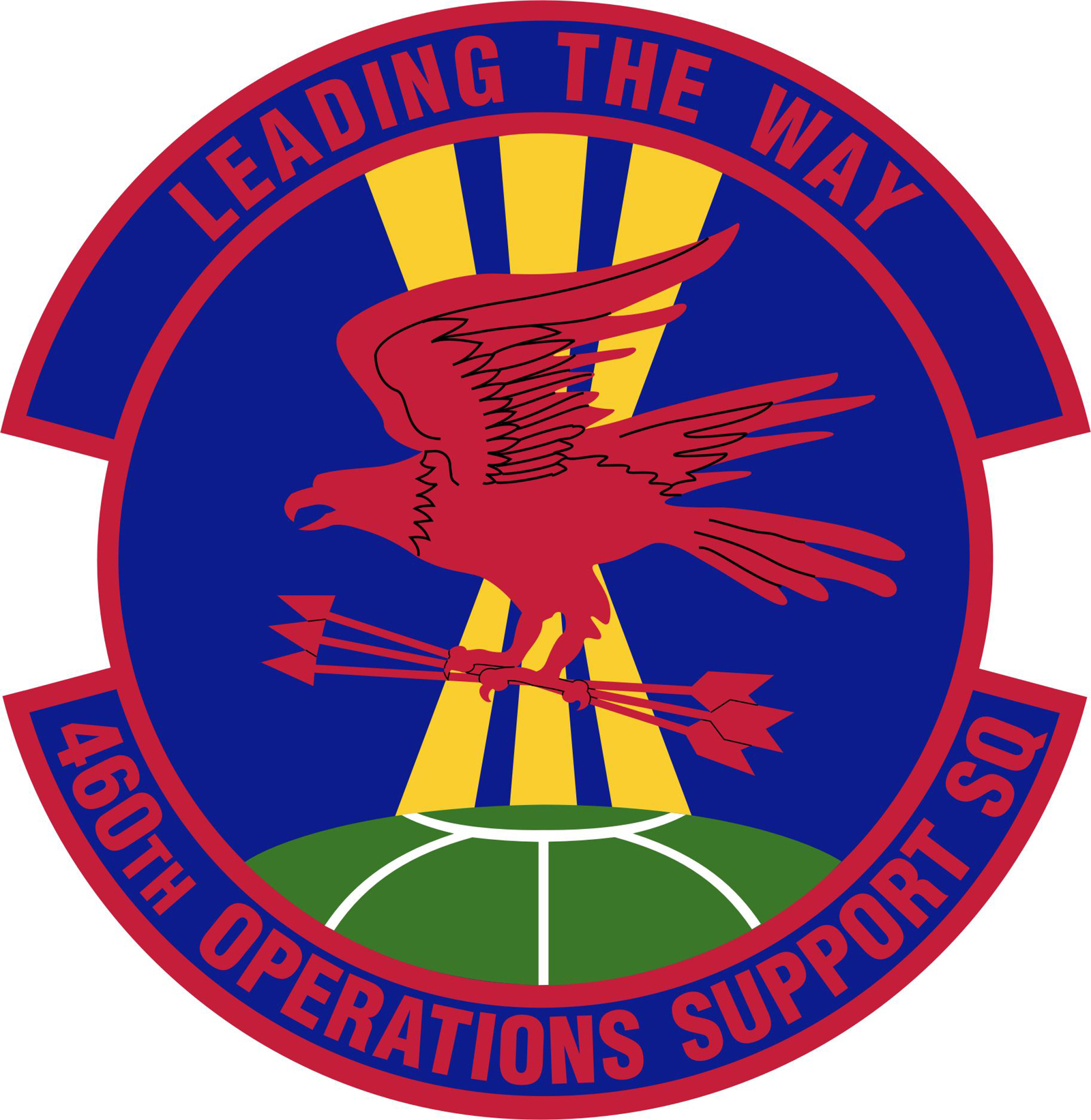
- Former 21st Operations Support Squadron emblem

The 460th Operations Support Squadron (460 OSS) was a United States Space Force unit. Assigned to Space Operations Command's Space Delta 4, it provided operational training and certification of all space professional assigned to the delta. It was headquartered at Buckley Space Force Base, Colorado.

On 11 March 2022, the squadron was inactivated with its mission absorbed by the delta's staff.

== List of commanders ==
- Lt Col Robert B. Riegel, July 2012
- Lt Col Timothy J. Bos, July 2014 – July 2016
- Lt Col Paul Freeman, June 2016 – 28 June 2018
- Lt Col Jason M. McCandless, 28 June 2018 – July 2020
- Lt Col Carrie Zederkof, ~July 2020 – July 2020

== See also ==
- Space Delta 4
