= Gold Bar Recruiter =

U.S. Military award

In the United States Army and United States Air Force, a Gold Bar Recruiter (GBR) is a newly-commissioned second lieutenant who has been ordered to active duty on permissive Temporary Duty (PTDY) orders to assist the Professor of Military Science (or Aerospace Science, as applicable) and the Recruiting Operations Officer (ROO) with training and recruiting duties.

This position typically begins 60 to 140 days before the BOLC B report date. A Gold Bar Recruiter adds a new perspective and energy to an ROTC battalion because of their recent familiarity with high school, college, and cadet life. If a "Gold-Bar" is in the National Guard, he/she may request extensions of their tour for up to 180 days providing their National Guard unit is willing to allow such an extension. Active duty officers may not receive such an extension, as their position at BOLC have already been reserved through their active duty units.

"Gold Bar" refers to the insignia of a second lieutenant in the United States Armed Forces: a single gold bar. The analogous position for the United States Navy and United States Marine Corps is Permissive Temporary Additional Duty (PTAD).
