= Basic Officer Leaders Course =

US Army training course

The Basic Officer Leader Course (BOLC) is a two-phased training course designed to commission officers and prepare them for service in the United States Army. Prospective officers complete Phase I (BOLC A) as either a cadet (United States Military Academy or Reserve Officers' Training Corps) or an officer candidate (Officer Candidate School (United States Army)) before continuing on to BOLC B as Second Lieutenants. If BOLC B is not completed within two years of commissioning, 2LTs will be administratively separated from the service unless there are extenuating circumstances. This is a progressive model designed to produce US Army officers with leadership skills, small unit tactics and certain branch-specific capabilities.

== BOLC A ==
The majority of Army officers start in Phase I of BOLC pre-commissioning training through the Reserve Officers' Training Corps, Officer Candidate School, or the United States Military Academy. At this stage officer candidates learn basic leadership skills and small unit tactics.

Direct commissioned officers (primarily medical/dental, legal and chaplains) not from a pre-commission training source must attend the Direct Commission Course (DCC) in place of BOLC A. DCC consists of a six-week course at Ft. Benning, Georgia or Ft Sill, OK (AMEDD). The primary purpose of this training is to provide basic military training to obtain the skills necessary to continue on to BOLC B. DCC is required for all direct-commissioned officers regardless of prior service experience.

== BOLC B ==
The second phase of the Basic Officer Leader Course - previously referred to as the Officer Basic Course (OBC) and BOLC III - is designed to develop new combat-effective officers and train them to perform their wartime duties as commissioned officers. It is during this phase that they learn the specifics of their branches, and the systems and equipment they will use in their duty unit.

- Chemical, Engineer, and Military Police officers train at the U.S. Army Maneuver Support Center of Excellence (MSCoE) at Fort Leonard Wood, Missouri.
- Infantry and Armor officers train at the U.S. Army Maneuver Center of Excellence (MCoE) at Fort Benning, Georgia.
- Signal Corps and Cyber Corps officers train at Fort Gordon, Georgia.
- Military Intelligence officers train at Fort Huachuca, Arizona.
- Adjutant General, Finance and Chaplain Corps officers train at Fort Jackson, South Carolina.
- Field Artillery and Air Defense Artillery officers train at the U.S. Army Fires Center of Excellence (FCoE) at Fort Sill, Oklahoma.
- Logistics (Transportation, Ordnance, and Quartermaster) officers train at the Army Sustainment University (ASU) at Fort Lee, Virginia.
- Aviation officers train at Fort Rucker, Alabama.
- Army Medical Department (AMEDD) officers train at Fort Sam Houston, Texas.
- Judge Advocate General's Corps officers train at The Judge Advocate General's Legal Center and School in Charlottesville, Virginia.

== See also ==
- Armor BOLC
- Engineer Officer Basic Course

== Notes ==
- BOLC II was a 7-week combat preparation course located at Fort Sill, OK and Fort Benning, GA. It was discontinued at the end of 2009, and as of 2010, any required training has now been merged into BOLC B (formerly BOLC III).
- Until June 2013, Army Judge Advocates, complete their training in reverse order, first attending BOLC B at The Judge Advocate General's Legal Center and School (TJAGLCS) in Charlottesville, Va., and then attend the DCC course at Fort Benning. As of the 191st Judge Advocate Officer Basic Course (JAOBC), the direct commissionees will attend DCC first and then attend BOLC B at TJAGLCS.
- Chaplains, who are direct commissioned, complete initial training and BOLC in one setting at the US Army Chaplain Center and School (USACHCS) located in Fort Jackson (South Carolina). The initial phase is called Chaplain Initial Military Training (CIMT) with the remaining three phases consisting of Chaplains BOLC (CH-BOLC). The four-phases are usually referred to as CH-BOLC, with little distinct separation between the different phases.
