= Nuclear Deterrence Operations Service Medal =

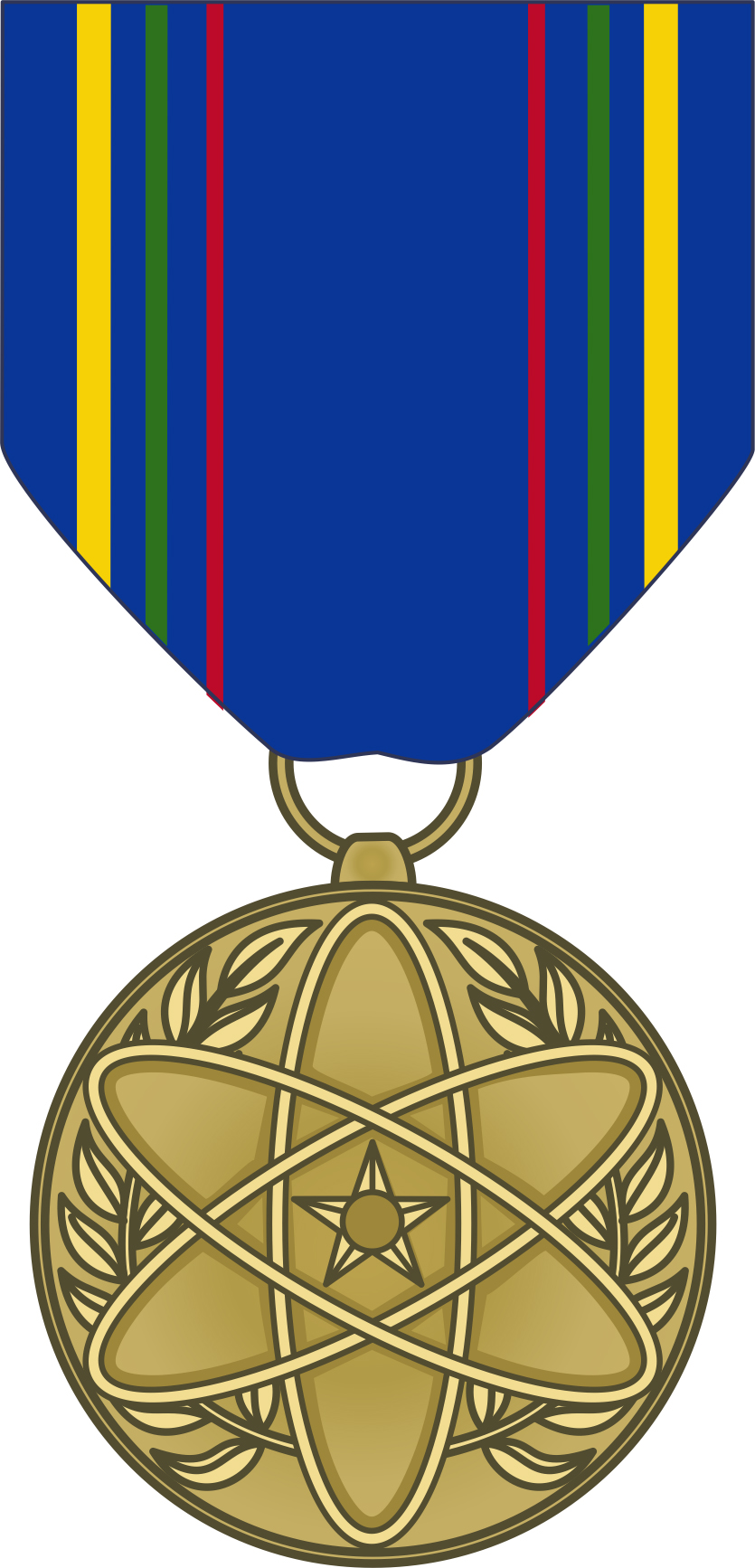
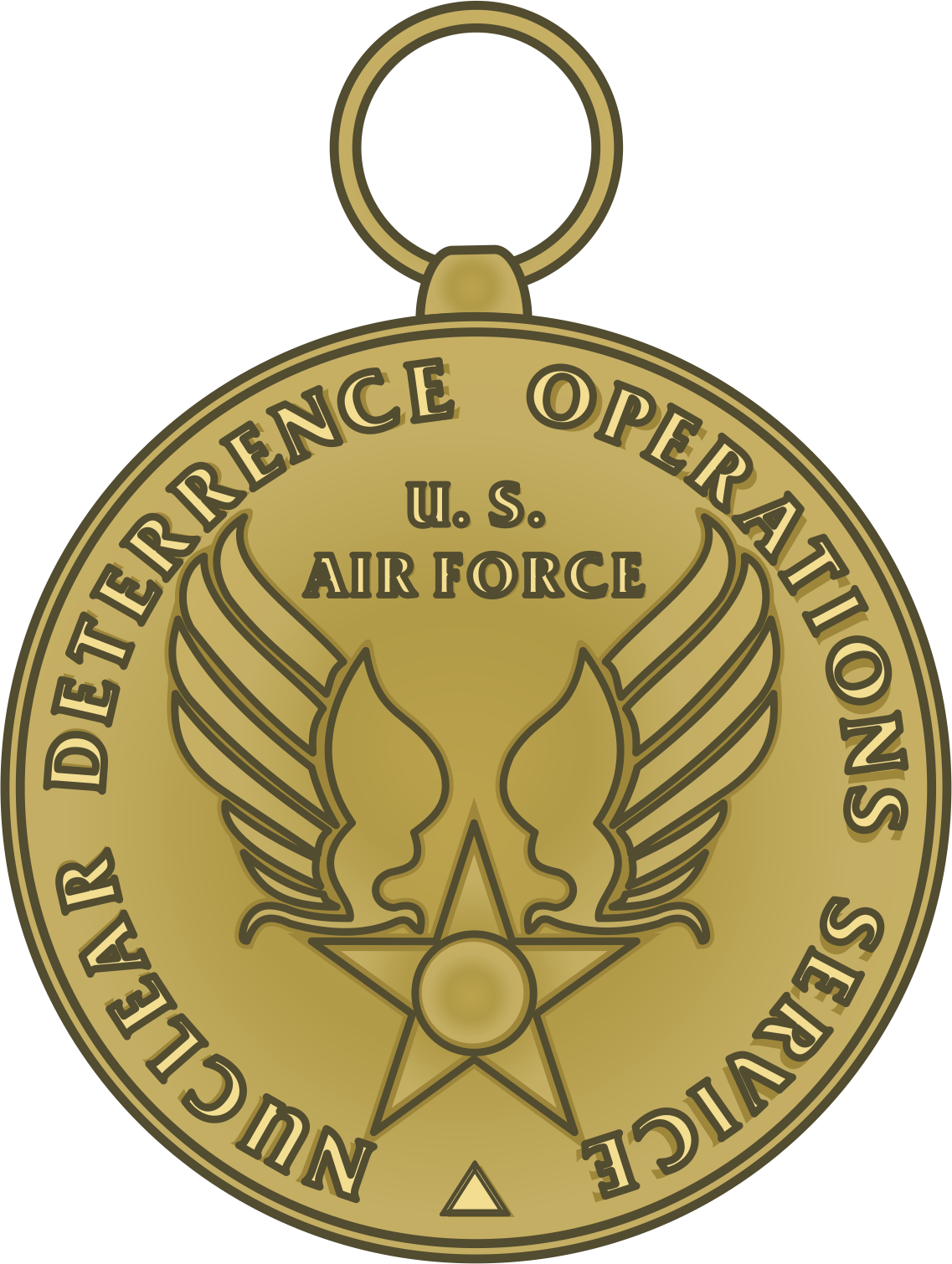
- Obverse
- Type: Military medal Service medal
- Awarded for: Participating in or directly supporting nuclear deterrence operations after 26 December 1991.
- Presented by: the Department of the Air Force
- Eligibility: U.S. Air Force and U.S. Space Force personnel
- Status: Currently awarded
- Established: 27 May 2014
- Service ribbon of the medal

Precedence
- Next (higher): Air and Space Campaign Medal
- Next (lower): Air and Space Overseas Ribbon - Short Tour

The Nuclear Deterrence Operations Service Medal is a service medal of the United States Air Force and United States Space Force established on 27 May 2014. The medal recognizes service by personnel in various career fields who have served in units involved with national strategic nuclear deterrence operations. Officer and enlisted personnel in the Regular Air Force, Regular Space Force, Air Force Reserve, and Air National Guard communities are eligible for this medal. Eligible service is retroactive from 26 December 1991.

== Background ==
The establishment of the Nuclear Deterrence Operations Service Medal was announced by Secretary of the Air Force Deborah Lee James on 27 May 2014. The timing of the announcement of the medal was very close to the timing of an announcement about the ongoing efforts of Air Force Global Strike Command to improve and reform the nuclear-capable and ICBM career fields. The creation of this medal is part of a multifaceted approach to attract and retain high-caliber personnel in the nuclear and missile operations career fields. The idea for this medal had been circulating within the Air Force for a few years prior to approval, with confirmation as early as 2011 that work was ongoing to develop this award.

== Criteria ==
The Nuclear Deterrence Operations Service Medal may be awarded to Active Duty, Reserve, and National Guard personnel for service in support of US Air Force and US Space Force nuclear deterrence operations from 26 December 1991 until a date to be determined. To be eligible personnel had to have been assigned to the Nuclear Enterprise and performed duties in one of the following, including all Airmen assigned to nuclear missile and bomb wings, regardless of career field:

- Nuclear operations
- Nuclear weapons storage facilities
- Nuclear command, control, and communication (NC3)
- Security
- Transportation
- Maintenance
- Facility management/maintenance
- Nuclear certified aircraft operations
- Explosive ordnance disposal
- Installation Personnel Reliability Program management

The required length of service to be eligible for the Nuclear Deterrence Operations Service Medal is 120 consecutive or 179 non-consecutive days attached, deployed, assigned, or mobilized to a unit supporting the nuclear deterrence mission. After completion of the medal's requirements is certified by the individual's squadron commander, the group commander may approve the award of the medal. Subsequent awards may only be earned by completing the same service and requirements after a permanent change of station from the last assignment when the medal was earned.

=== "N" Device ===
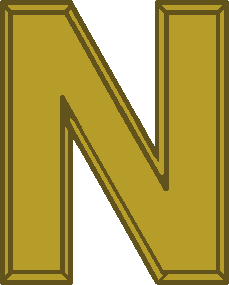
"N" Device as worn on the ribbon

Certain individuals may be further recognized for their service with the award of a gold "N" device to attach to the medal's suspension and service ribbons. Per AFI 36-2806 para A14.11.5.2, this device will be worn by airmen who meet one of the following criteria:

A) Dispatched to a missile complex for 179 non-consecutive days in direct support of Intercontinental Ballistic Missile operations, and performed duties in one of the following Air Force Specialty Codes:

- Missile Maintenance (21MX, 2M0XX)
- Munitions and Weapons (2W0XX, 2W1XX, 2W2XX)
- Security Forces (31PX, 3P0XX)
- Tactical Aircraft Maintenance (2A3X3) (when duty includes performing maintenance on nuclear laden aircraft)
- Missile Facility Managers (8S000)
- Services (3M0X1)
- Fuels (2F0XX)
- Transportation (2T1XX, 2T3XX)
- Civil Engineering (32EX, 3EXXX)
- Cyberspace Support (3D1X1, 3D1X2, 3D1X3, 3D100)
- Operations (11HXC, 13NX, 1A9XX)
- 13SX officers on or before 9 February 2013

B) for nuclear laden aircraft: nuclear certified aircrew, aircraft maintenance technicians, munitions maintenance technicians, combat crew communications, nuclear certified controllers, and security forces performing guard duties.

== Appearance ==
Ribbon with oak leaf cluster

The medal is round and made of a gold colored metal. A graphic on the medal represents the core mission for personnel, nuclear capability. The medal is gold in color to represent the legacy of the United States' strategic nuclear deterrence mission. The medal is suspended from a blue ribbon with red, green and gold stripes. The blue represents "nuclear dominance of the sky", the red represents "power and passion" in providing nuclear deterrence, green represents Earth and global capability, and gold represents the participating personnel, "the wealth of our nuclear enterprise".

Subsequent awards of the medal are recognized by oak leaf clusters. The "N" device may only be awarded once.

== See also ==
- SSBN Deterrent Patrol insignia
- United States military award devices
