= 762nd Bombardment Squadron =

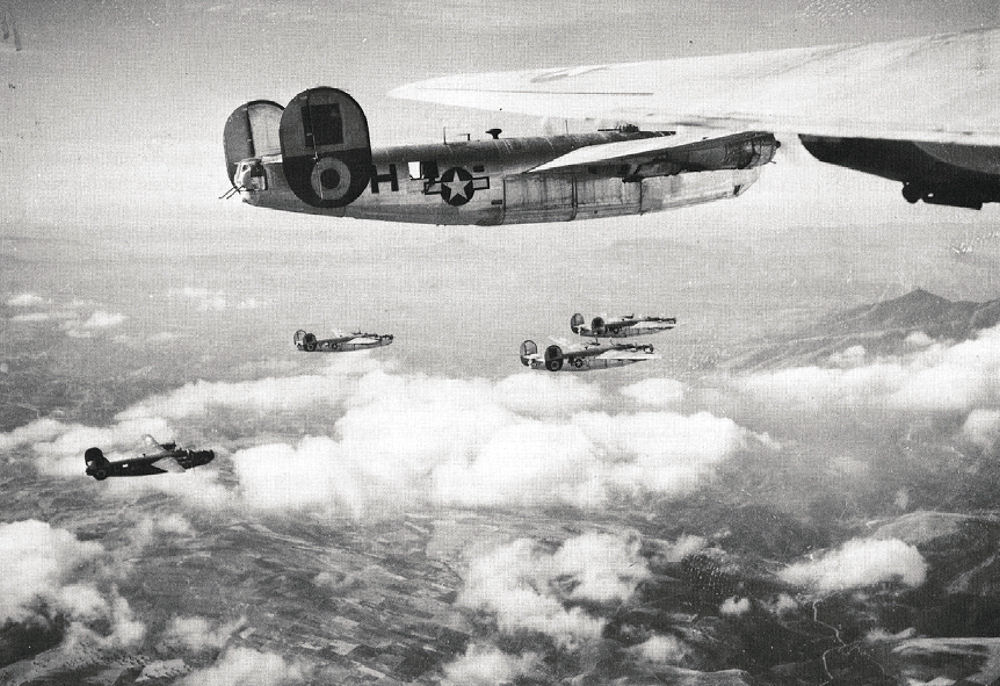
- 460th Bombardment Group B-24 Liberators
- Active: 1943–1945
- Country: United States
- Branch: United States Air Force
- Role: Heavy bomber
- Engagements: Mediterranean Theater of Operations
- Decorations: Distinguished Unit Citation

The 762nd Bombardment Squadron is a former United States Army Air Forces unit, activated during World War II. After training in the United States throughout 1943, it deployed to the Mediterranean Theater of Operations. From early 1944, the squadron participated in the strategic bombing campaign against Germany, earning a Distinguished Unit Citation for its actions. Following V-E Day, the squadron moved to Brazil, where it became part of Air Transport Command, returning troops to the United States. It was inactivated on 26 September 1945.

== History ==
The 762nd Bombardment Squadron was first activated at Alamogordo Army Air Field, New Mexico on 1 July 1943 as one of the four original squadrons assigned to the 460th Bombardment Group. A cadre of the unit's air echelon was sent to Orlando Army Air Base, Florida for specialized training with the Army Air Forces School of Applied Tactics. In August, the unit was filled out with ground personnel at Kearns Army Air Base, Utah, then moved to Chatham Army Air Field, Georgia to complete its training with Consolidated B-24 Liberator heavy bombers. Upon completing training, the squadron departed for the Mediterranean Theater of Operations in January 1944.

The squadron completed its deployment to Spinazzola Airfield, Italy by the middle of February 1944, and entered the strategic bombing campaign against Germany the following month, with an attack on a marshalling yard and docks at Metković, Yugoslavia. It attacked oil refineries and storage facilities, railroads, industrial areas, including aircraft manufacturing plants in Austria, Czechoslovakia, France, Germany, Greece, Hungary, Italy, Romania and Yugoslavia.

On 26 July 1944, the squadron was part of a 460th Group formation that led the 55th Bombardment Wing on an attack against an airfield and aircraft manufacturing plant at Zwolfaxing, Austria. It attacked the target despite heavy defensive flak and adverse weather, for which it was awarded a Distinguished Unit Citation.

The squadron was occasionally diverted from the strategic bombing mission to perform air interdiction and close air support missions. In August 1944, it supported Operation Dragoon, the invasion of southern France, by attacking submarine pens, marshalling yards and artillery batteries in the area of the amphibious landings. It struck lines of communications, railroads, ammunition dumps and other targets in connection with Operation Grapeshot, the Spring 1945 Allied offensive in Northern Italy. The squadron flew its last mission against a target in northern Italy on 26 April 1945.

After V-E Day, the 460th Group and its squadrons were transferred to the South Atlantic Division, Air Transport Command, moving to Parnamirim Field, near Natal, Brazil to participate in the Green Project. The project was tasked with transporting 50,000 military personnel a month from the European and Mediterranean Theaters back to the United States, with priority for those who were under orders to redeploy to the Pacific to fight against the Japanese. The squadron's combat veterans resented this assignment, but continued supporting the project until inactivating on 26 September 1945.

== Lineage ==
- Constituted as the 762d Bombardment Squadron (Heavy) on 19 May 1943

Activated on 1 July 1943
Redesignated 762d Bombardment Squadron, Heavy c. 3 September 1944
Inactivated on 26 September 1945

=== Assignments ===
- 460th Bombardment Group, 1 July 1943 – 26 September 1945

=== Stations ===
- Alamogordo Army Air Field, New Mexico, 1 July 1943
- Kearns Army Air Base, Utah, 31 August 1943
- Chatham Army Air Field, Georgia, 29 October 1943 – 3 January 1944
- Spinazzola Airfield, Italy, c. 11 February 1944 – 6 June 1945
- Waller Field, Trinidad, 15 June 1945
- Parnamirim Field, Brazil, 30 June – 26 September 1945

=== Aircraft ===
- Consolidated B-24 Liberator, 1943–1945

=== Awards and campaigns ===
Award streamer	Award	Dates	Notes
	Distinguished Unit Citation	26 July 1944	Austria

Campaign Streamer	Campaign	Dates	Notes
	Air Offensive, Europe	c. 11 February 1944 – 5 June 1944	
	Air Combat, EAME Theater	c. 11 February 1944 – 11 May 1945	
	Rome-Arno	c. 11 February 1944 – 9 September 1944	
	Central Europe	22 March 1944 – 21 May 1945	
	Normandy	6 June 1944 – 24 July 1944	
	Northern France	25 July 1944 – 14 September 1944	
	Southern France	15 August 1944 – 14 September 1944	
	North Apennines	10 September 1944 – 4 April 1945	
	Rhineland	15 September 1944 – 21 March 1945	
	Po Valley	3 April 1945 – 8 May 1945	
	American Theater without inscription	15 June 1945 – 25 September 1945	

== See also ==
- B-24 Liberator units of the United States Army Air Forces
