= 465th Bombardment Group =

465th Bombardment Group

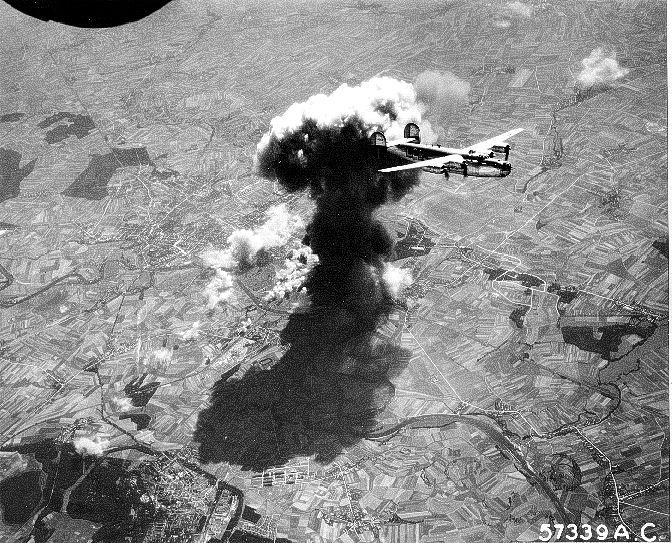
- 465th Bombardment Group making a bomb run during 1944
- Active: 1943–1945; 1953–1957
- Country: United States
- Branch: United States Air Force
- Role: Bombardment
- Part of: Strategic Air Command
- Motto(s): Onus Ferrens Vitam Latin Cargo Carrying Life

The 465th Bombardment Group is an inactive United States Air Force unit. It was last assigned to the 465th Troop Carrier Wing at Évreux-Fauville Air Base, France, where it was inactivated on 8 July 1957.

Originally activated in 1943 as the 465th Bombardment Group, a World War II United States Army Air Forces combat organization. The group served primarily in the Mediterranean, African, and Middle East Theater of World War II and was awarded two Distinguished Unit Citations for its actions in the summer of 1944.

Inactivated at the end of the war and allotted to the Air Force Reserve, the group was reactivated as the 465th Troop Carrier Group, Medium during the 1950s. It was assigned to the like numbered 465th Troop Carrier Wing, Medium.

== History ==
=== World War II ===
Activated on 19 May 1943 at Alamogordo Army Airfield, New Mexico as a B-24 Liberator heavy bomb group; assigned to II Bomber Command for training. Moved to Kerns, Utah for group formation and personnel assignments. Assigned 780th, 781st, 782d and 783d Bombardment Squadrons and began initial training in September. Reassigned to McCook Army Airfield, Nebraska in October and received full complement of personnel. Completed training by February 1944 and received deployment orders to the Mediterranean Theater of Operations (MTO), being assigned to Fifteenth Air Force in Southern Italy. New B-24s for combat operations were assigned to the group from Consolidated and training was completed.

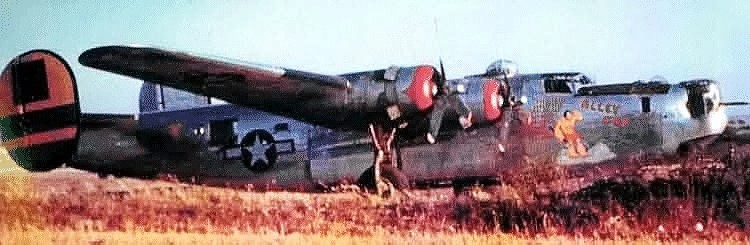
465th Bombardment Group Consolidated B-24H Liberator 41-29347 "Alley Ooop" at Pantanella Airfield, Italy (Note: This plane was lost on 28 July 1944, on a mission over Yugoslavia)

After training was completed the air echelon was then deployed to Tunisia. Began movement overseas via South Atlantic Route via Morrison Field, Florida, via Trinidad, Brazil, Dakar, Senegal and Marrakesh, French Morocco, then to the Tunisia. Completed training and moved to Pantanella Airfield, Italy in April 1944

Once in Italy the 465th was assigned to the 55th Bombardment Wing of Fifteenth Air Force. Entered combat on 5 May 1944, and served primarily as a strategic bombardment organization until late in April 1945. During this time, the Group attacked marshalling yards, dock facilities, oil refineries, oil storage plants, aircraft factories, and other objectives in Italy, France, Germany, Czechoslovakia, Austria, Hungary, and the Balkans. On two different missions – to marshalling yards and an oil refinery at Vienna on 8 July 1944 and to steel plants at Friedrichshafen on 3 August 1944 – the group bombed its targets despite antiaircraft fire and fighter opposition, being awarded a Distinguished Unit Citation (DUC) for each of these attacks. Other operations included bombing troop concentrations and bivouac areas in May 1944 to aid the Partisans in Yugoslavia; attacking enemy troops and supply lines to assist the drive toward Rome, in May to June 1944; striking bridges, rail lines, and gun emplacements prior to the invasion of Southern France in August 1944; bombing rail facilities and rolling stock in October 1944 to support the advance of Russian and Romanian forces in the Balkans; and hitting troops, gun positions, bridges, and supply lines during April 1945 in support of Allied forces in northern Italy.

After V-E Day, was assigned to Green Project which was the movement of troops from Europe to the United States via the South Atlantic Transport Route. B-24s were modified with sealed bomb bays, removal of all defensive armament and internal fuselage equipped with seating to carry approximately 30 personnel. Was assigned to Air Transport Command at Waller Field, Trinidad. Moved personnel from staging area at Atkinson Field, British Guiana to Morrison Field, Florida. Provided air transport until the end of July when the unit was inactivated .

=== United States Air Forces in Europe ===
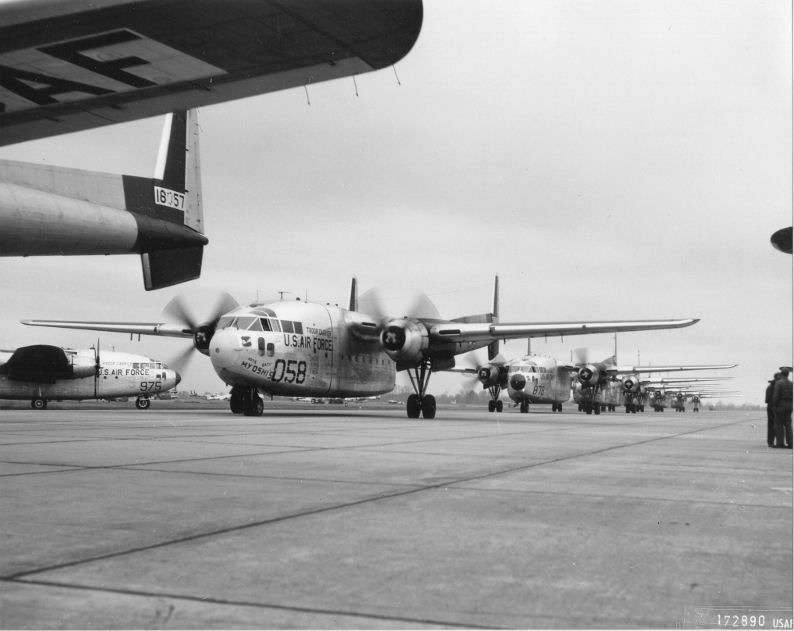
465th Troop Carrier Group Fairchild C-119G Flying Boxcars taxiing at Évreux-Fauville Air Base 1956

The unit was reactivated as the 465th Troop Carrier Group, Medium on 1 February 1953 at Donaldson Air Force Base, South Carolina, where it assumed the mission, equipment and personnel of the 443d Troop Carrier Group, a reserve unit that had been mobilized for the Korean War. Although the 465th Troop Carrier Wing was activated the same day, it was located at Mitchel Air Force Base, New York and the group was not assigned to it. Instead, the group was assigned directly to Eighteenth Air Force, but attached to the 64th Troop Carrier Wing, which was stationed at Donaldson. In August, the group was finally assigned the 465th Wing, but it remained attached to the 64th Wing. Squadrons assigned to the group were the 780th, 781st and 782d Troop Carrier Squadrons. The 443d Group was in the process of converting to the Fairchild C-119 Flying Boxcar from the Curtiss C-46 Commando it was flying when mobilized when it was replaced by the 465th. In October, the group's attachment changed to the 63d Troop Carrier Wing, which was also located at Donaldson and it became operational with the Flying Boxcar.

In November, the group moved overseas to Toul-Rosières Air Base, France, with the ground echelon sailing on the USS General Alexander M. Patch, while the air echelon departed Donaldson with their C-119s at the beginning of December. At Toul, it became part of Twelfth Air Force. Although a reconnaissance wing had been located at Toul earlier in the year, construction of the base was still underway, so the 781st Squadron was located at Wiesbaden Air Base, Germany and the 782d Squadron was at Neubiberg Air Base, Germany. The group was still assigned to the 465th Wing, which remained in the United States until late December, when it became clear that the wing's deployment to Europe would be delayed, and the group was assigned to Twelfth Air Force. The squadron participated in airlift operations, tests and exercises in Europe. Although the group mission was troop carrier, there were few American airborne troops in Europe, and the group's missions focused on theater airlift flights, particularly supporting fighter units deploying to Wheelus Air Base for training at the ranges there.

Construction progressed and on 1 April 1954, the 465th Wing finally moved to Toul and by the start of the following month the 781st and 782d Squadrons also joined the group. In late May 1955, the group moved to Évreux-Fauville Air Base, France, becoming the first USAF tactical unit on the base. Evreaux had been the wing's intended base in France, but construction had been delayed and it was not able to house the group until 1954. The group became non-operational in March 1956 when the 465th Wing began to transition to the dual deputy organization structure. Its operational squadrons were attached to the wing until the group was inactivated in March 1957.

== Lineage ==
- Constituted as the 465th Bombardment Group (Heavy) on 19 May 1943

Activated on 1 August 1943
Redesignated 465th Bombardment Group, Heavy c. 25 January 1944
Inactivated on 31 July 1945

- Redesignated 465th Troop Carrier Group, Medium and activated on 1 February 1953

Inactivated on 12 March 1957

- Redesignated 465th Bombardment Group, Heavy on 31 July 1985 (remained inactive)

=== Assignments ===
- II Bomber Command, 1 August 1943 – 1 February 1944
- 55th Bombardment Wing, April 1944
- Caribbean Wing, Air Transport Command, 15 June – 31 July 1945
- Eighteenth Air Force, 1 February 1953 (attached to 64th Troop Carrier Wing)
- 465th Troop Carrier Wing, 25 August 1953 (attached to 64th Troop Carrier Wing until October 1953, attached to 63d Troop Carrier Wing until 30 November 1953)
- Twelfth Air Force, 26 December 1953
- 465th Troop Carrier Wing 1 April 1954 – 12 March 1957 (not operational after 1 March 1956)

=== Components ===
- 780th Bombardment Squadron (later Troop Carrier Squadron): 1 August 1943 – 31 July 1945, 1 February 1953 – 12 March 1957
- 781st Bombardment Squadron (later Troop Carrier Squadron): 1 August 1943 – 31 July 1945, 1 February 1953 – 12 March 1957
- 782d Bombardment Squadron (later Troop Carrier Squadron): 1 August 1943 – 31 July 1945, 1 February 1953 – 12 March 1957
- 783d Bombardment Squadron: 1 August 1943 – 31 July 1945

=== Stations ===
- Alamogordo Army Air Field, New Mexico, 1 August 1943
- Kearns Army Air Base, Utah, September 1943
- McCook Army Airfield, Nebraska, c. 5 October 1943 – 1 February 1944
- Pantanella Airfield, Italy April 1944 – June 1945
- Waller Field, Trinidad, 15 June – 31 July 1945
- Donaldson Air Force Base, South Carolina, 25 August 1953 – 30 November 1953
- Toul-Rosières Air Base, France, December 1953
- Évreux-Fauville Air Base, France, 23 May 1955 – 8 July 1957

=== Aircraft flown ===
- Consolidated B-24 Liberator, 1943–1945
- Fairchild C-119 Flying Boxcar, 1953, 1954–1957
- Boeing B-52G Stratofortress, 1963–1968
- Boeing KC-135 Stratotanker, 1963–1968.

== See also ==
- 518th Air Service Group Support unit for the group in World War II
