= 10th Missile Squadron =

US Air Force unit

10th Missile Squadron

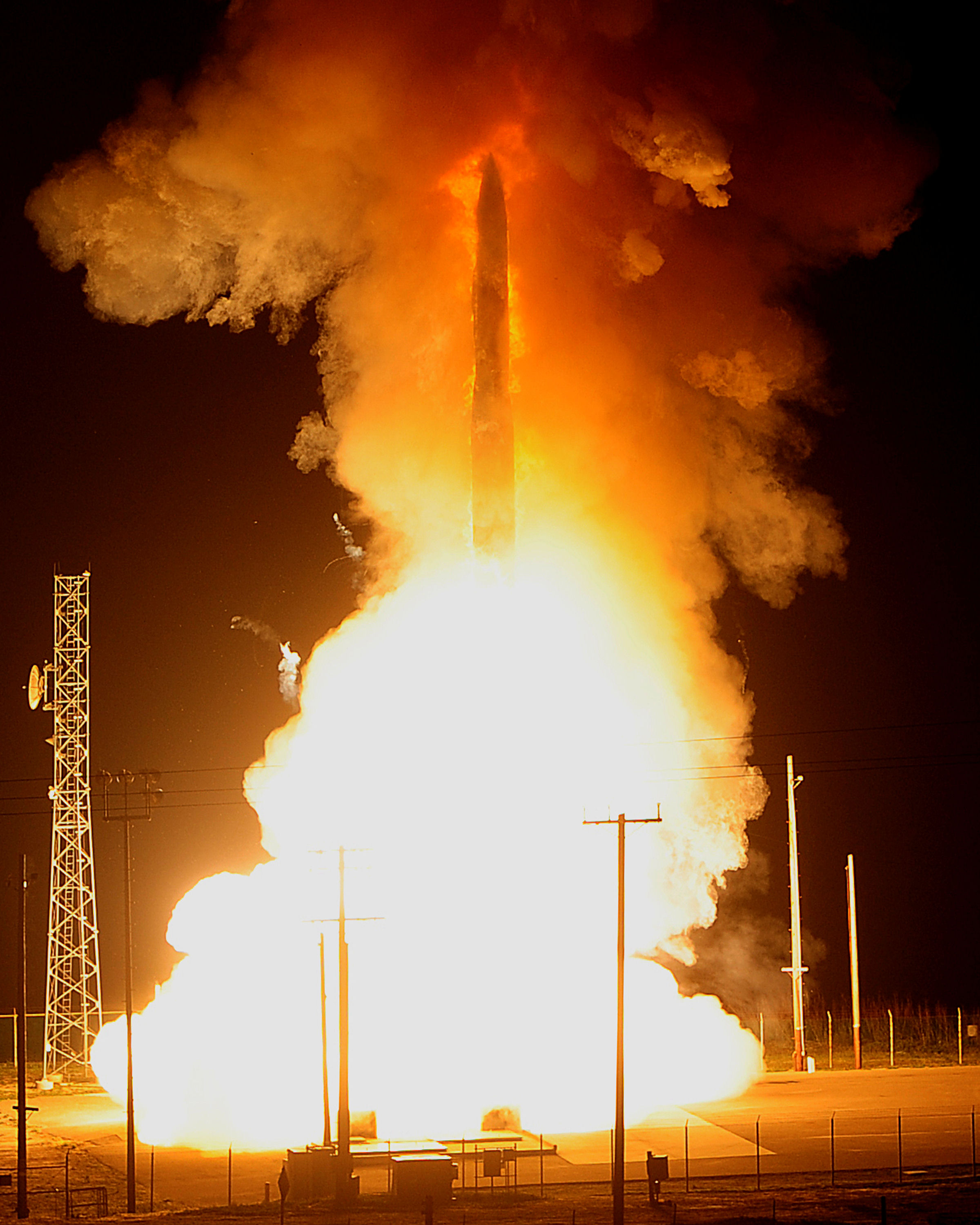
- LGM-30G Minuteman III launch
- Active: 1940–1944; 1947–1949; 1955–1961; 1961–present
- Country: United States
- Branch: United States Air Force
- Type: Squadron
- Role: Intercontinental ballistic missile
- Part of: Air Force Global Strike Command
- Garrison/HQ: Malmstrom AFB, Montana
- Motto: The First Ace in the Hole
- Engagements: World War II (Antisubmarine Campaign)

- Decorations: Air Force Outstanding Unit Award (7×)

Commanders
- Notable commanders: Lance W. Lord

Insignia
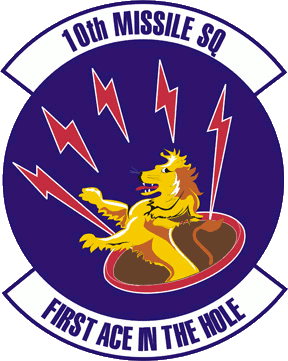
- 10th Strategic Missile Squadron emblem (Note: Approved 21 June 1963. Description: On an Air Force blue disc, an Air Force golden yellow demi lion rampant shaded golden brown, his tongue red, emerging from a hole dark brown rimmed red, fimbriated white five red lightning flashes radiating upward from the hole, fimbriated white.)

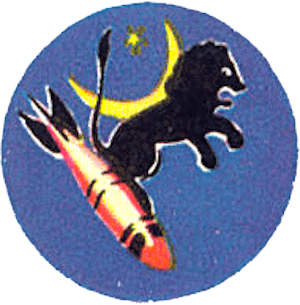
- 10th Bombardment Squadron emblem (Note: Approved 27 September 1940. Description: In front of a yellow crescent moon and star, a black lion sejant erect on a red aerial bomb and placed at a downward angle.)

The 10th Missile Squadron is a United States Air Force unit, assigned to the 341st Operations Group, stationed at Malmstrom Air Force Base, Montana. The squadron operates the LGM-30G Minuteman III Intercontinental ballistic missile (ICBM), and is responsible for maintaining combat-ready nuclear deterrent forces.

Originally activated during World War II as the 10th Bombardment Squadron, the unit flew combat missions in the China-Burma-India Theater using B-24 Liberators. After being inactivated several times, the squadron was re-designated and activated as a missile unit in 1962 during the Cold War, becoming part of the United States’ strategic nuclear deterrent.

== History ==
=== World War II ===
Established in 1939 as a prewar bombardment squadron, it was equipped with a mixture of Douglas B-18 Bolo medium and early-model Boeing B-17 Flying Fortress heavy bombers. It trained over the US east coast flying training missions. It also had some second-line Northrop A-17 Nomad dive bombers assigned. After the outbreak of World War II in Europe it flew patrols over the Atlantic Coast searching for German U-boat activity.

Deployed to Borinquen Field, Puerto Rico in late 1940, the unit was assigned to the Caribbean Air Force, 25th Bombardment Group. The unit was called to face possible action, with its sister 1st Bombardment Squadron, in April and May 1942, however, when it patrolled the Vichy French Martinique area. By 1 November 1942, the squadron was transferred (minus personnel) to Edinburgh Field, Trinidad.

In August 1943, the 10th Squadron, which had by then been consolidated with the personnel and equipment of the old 1st Bombardment Squadron re-equipped with the North American B-25 Mitchell. A detachment was also maintained at Port-of-Spain at this time.

With the Navy taking over the antisubmarine mission, the squadron moved to France Field, Canal Zone in December 1943, where it became an element of the VI Bomber Command. The Squadron carried on patrols up and down the Atlantic coast of Panama and into neighboring Colombian waters until relieved from assignment to Sixth Air Force and returned to the United States. on 2 May 1944. It moved to Lincoln Army Air Field, Nebraska where it became a B-25 Mitchell medium bomber replacement training unit under Second Air Force. Inactivated June 1944.

=== Reserve bombardment squadron ===
The squadron was reactivated in June 1947 as a reserve unit at Westover Field (later Westover Air Force Base), Massachusetts, where it was assigned to the 341st Bombardment Group. It was not equipped with operational aircraft, but flew North American AT-6 Texan and Beechcraft AT-11 Kansan trainer aircraft. Its training was supervised by the 108th AAF Base Unit (later 108th AF Base Unit, 2227th Air Force Reserve Training Center) of Air Defense Command (ADC). In 1948 Continental Air Command assumed responsibility for managing reserve and Air National Guard units from ADC. President Truman's reduced 1949 defense budget required reductions in the number of units in the Air Force, and the 490th was inactivated in June 1949.

=== Strategic Air Command bomber operations ===
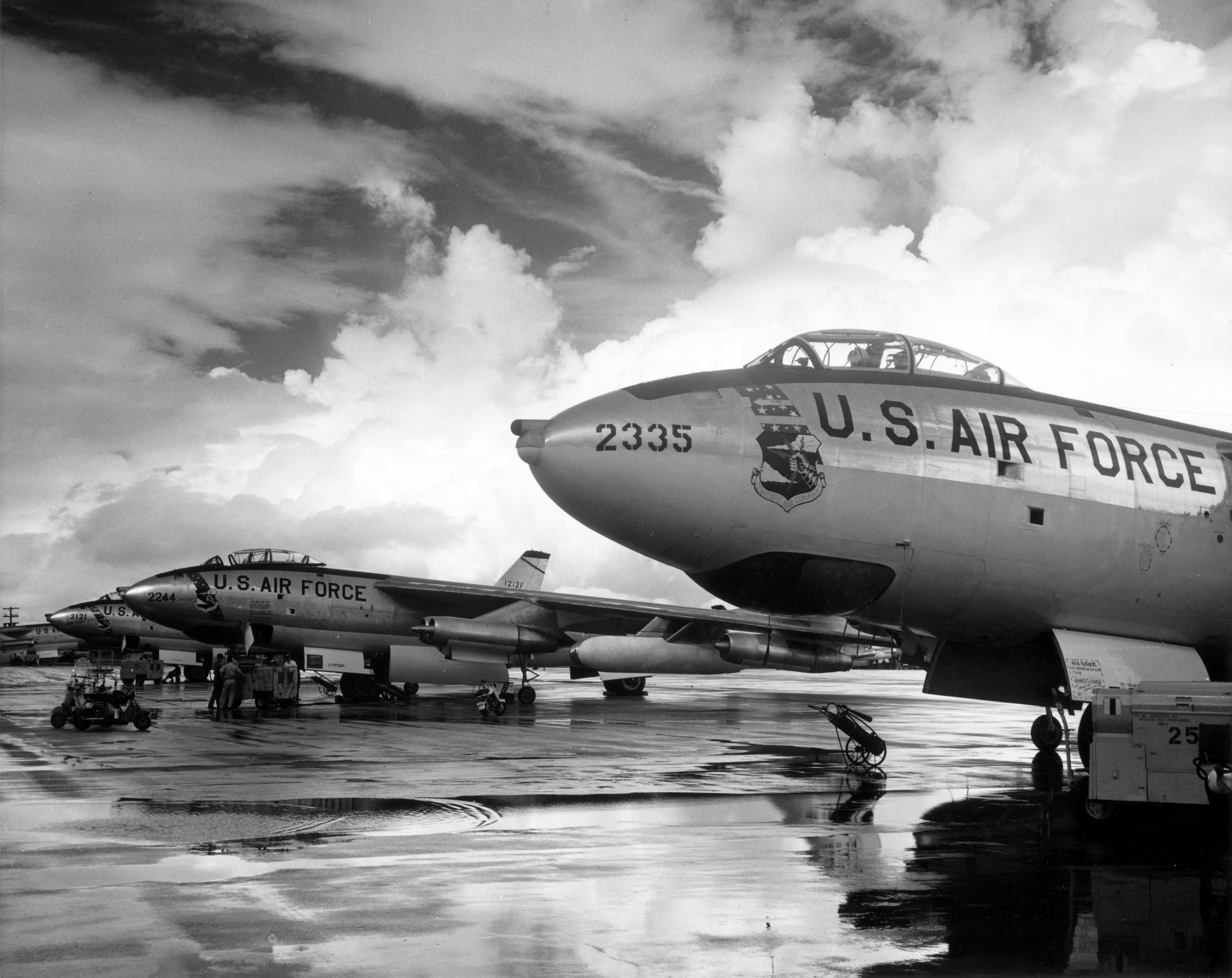
SAC B-47 Stratojets

The squadron was activated at Abilene Air Force Base, Texas on 1 September 1955, as the Air Force reopened it as a Strategic Air Command (SAC) base for Boeing B-47 Stratojet bombers. The squadron trained in strategic bombardment operations with the B-47 and participated in SAC exercises and operations. From January through April 1958, the squadron deployed with the 341st Bombardment Wing to Andersen Air Force Base, Guam. Shortly thereafter, its planes went through Project Milk Bottle to strengthen their wings for low level operations. The squadron also participated in Operation Reflex alert operations. Reflex placed Stratojets and Boeing KC-97s at bases closer to the Soviet Union for 90 day periods, although individuals rotated back to home bases during unit Reflex deployments.

Starting in 1958, SAC's B-47 wings of began to assume an alert posture at their home bases, reducing the amount of time spent on alert at overseas bases. General Thomas S. Power’s initial goal was to maintain one third of SAC's planes on fifteen minute ground alert, fully fueled and ready for combat to reduce vulnerability to a Soviet missile strike. Its last Reflex deployment ended on 15 July 1959. (Note: However, a later wing history indicated that the 341st Wing continued to deploy some B-47s to the United Kingdom as late as April 1960. No byline (1 April 1960). "Abstract, 341 Bombardment Wing Maintenance Analysis Report". Air Force History Index.) In April 1961, the squadron began drawing down in preparation for inactivation and was inactivated on 25 June 1961, transferring its aircraft to other SAC wings.

=== Intercontinental Ballistic Missile Squadron ===
It was reactivated on 1 December 1961 as an Intercontinental Ballistic Missile squadron assigned to the 341st Missile Wing at Malmstrom Air Force Base, Montana. It was initially equipped with 50 LGM-30A Minuteman Is in early 1962, becoming SAC's first operational Minuteman squadron. It upgraded to the Minuteman IB in 1964 and the Minuteman IIF in 1967. It received control of LGM-30G Minuteman III silos from the inactivating 321st Strategic Missile Wing at Grand Forks Air Force Base, North Dakota in 1996; the Minuteman IIs being retired. It has maintained ICBMs on alert ever since.

10th Missile Squadron Launch Facilities

Missile Alert Facilities (A-E flights, each controlling 10 missiles) are located as follows:

A-01 7.5 mi SE of Armington MT, 47°16′54″N 110°48′03″W
B-01 6.5 mi ExNE of Geyser MT, 47°17′07″N 110°21′36″W
C-01 1.6 mi NW of Windham MT, 47°05′44″N 110°09′47″W
D-01 7.3 mi ExNE of Denton MT, 47°22′34″N 109°48′52″W
E-01 7.5 mi SxSW of Winifred MT, 47°27′13″N 109°25′03″W

== Lineage ==
- Constituted as the 10th Bombardment Squadron (Heavy) on 22 December 1939

Activated on 1 February 1940
Redesignated 10th Bombardment Squadron (Medium) on 7 May 1942
Redesignated 10th Bombardment Squadron, Medium on 21 September 1943
Inactivated on 17 June 1944
Redesignated 10th Bombardment Squadron, Light on 11 March 1947
Activated in the reserve on 18 June 1947
Inactivated on 27 June 1949
Redesignated 10th Bombardment Squadron, Medium on 7 June 1955
Activated on 1 September 1955
Discontinued and inactivated on 25 June 1961
Redesignated 10th Strategic Missile Squadron, (ICBM-Minuteman) and activated on 2 August 1961 (not organized)
Organized on 1 December 1961
Redesignated 10th Missile Squadron on 1 September 1991

=== Assignments ===
- 25th Bombardment Group, 1 February 1940 (attached to VI Bomber Command after 13 December 1943)
- VI Bomber Command, 17 December 1943
- Second Air Force, c. 9 May – 17 June 1944
- 341st Bombardment Group, 18 June 1947 – 27 June 1949
- 341st Bombardment Wing, 1 September 1955 – 25 June 1961
- Strategic Air Command, 2 August 1961 (not organized)
- 341st Strategic Missile Wing, 1 December 1961
- 341st Operations Group, 1 September 1991 – present

=== Stations ===
- Langley Field, Virginia, 1 February – 26 October 1940
- Borinquen Field, Puerto Rico, 1 November 1940
- Edinburgh Field, Trinidad, c. 1 November 1942

Detachment operated from Port of Spain, Trinidad, 27 August – 12 October 1943

- Waller Field, Trinidad, 1 October 1943
- France Field, Panama Canal Zone, 11 December 1943 – 2 May 1944
- Lincoln Army Air Field, Nebraska, 25 May – 17 June 1944
- Westover Field (later Westover Air Force Base), Massachusetts, 18 June 1947 – 27 June 1949
- Abilene Air Force Base (later Dyess Air Force Base), Texas, 1 September 1955 – 25 June 1961 (deployed to Andersen Air Force Base, Guam, 9 January – c. 3 April 1958)
- Malmstrom Air Force Base, Montana, 1 December 1961 – present

=== Aircraft and Missiles ===
- Boeing B-17 Flying Fortress, 1940
- Northrop A-17 Nomad, 1940–1941
- Douglas B-18 Bolo, 1940–1943
- North American B-25 Mitchell, 1943–1944
- North American AT-6 Texan, 1947–1949
- Beechcraft AT-11 Kansan, 1947–1949
- Boeing B-47 Stratojet, 1956–1961
- LGM-30A/B Minuteman I, 1962–1968
- LGM-30F Minuteman II, 1968–1991
- LGM-30G Minuteman III, 1996 – present

== See also ==
- List of United States Air Force missile squadrons
