= 341st Missile Wing LGM-30 Minuteman missile launch sites =

US Air Force locations in Montana

This is a list of the LGM-30 Minuteman missile Missile Alert Facilities and Launch Facilities of the 341st Missile Wing, 20th Air Force, located at Malmstrom AFB, Montana.

The wing was the first United States Air Force LGM-30 Minuteman ICBM wing. On 15 July 1961, the 341st Strategic Missile Wing was reactivated, and a year later, in late July 1962, the first LGM-30A Minuteman I arrived and was placed at the Alpha-9 launch facility. The 10th SMS accepted its final flight on 28 February 1963. Two months later, the 12th SMS became 100 percent combat ready. In July, the 490th SMS became fully operational, giving the 341st SMW responsibility for 150 silos. A fourth squadron, the 564th, a former SM-65D Atlas unit, stood up on 1 April 1966 with the LGM-30F Minuteman II.

Beginning in 1967, all Minuteman I A and B models were replaced by the Minuteman II. The upgrade was completed by June 1969. In 1975, the 564th SMS switched from the Minuteman II to the LGM-30G Minuteman III model.

On 28 September 1991, President Bush ordered all Minuteman IIs off alert status. This order affected three-quarters of the 200 ICBMs stationed at Malmstrom. From 1992 to 1994, the Air Force removed 150 Minuteman II missiles from their silos to comply with the pending START I Treaty. The 10th, 12th and 490th silos were upgraded to receive Minuteman III missiles, joining the 50 Minuteman III missiles already on alert status with the 564th.

In 2007 the 564th SMS's 50 silos were retired to reduce operating costs. They were last upgraded in the early 1970s and were considerably different from the newer Minuteman III silos upgraded in the 1990s. With their inactivation, the United States number of ground-based ICBMs was reduced to 450.

== Facilities ==
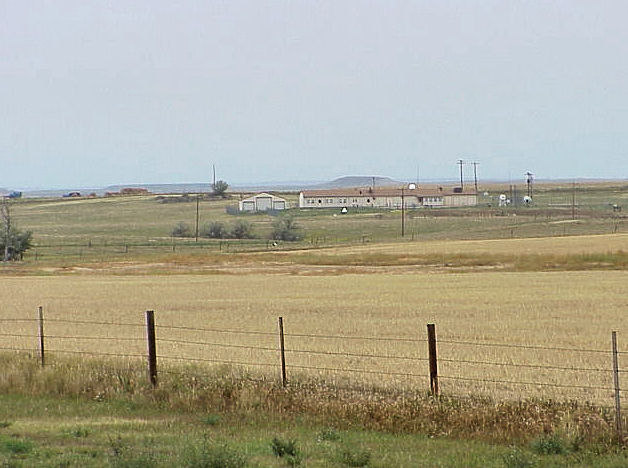
Missile Alert Facility

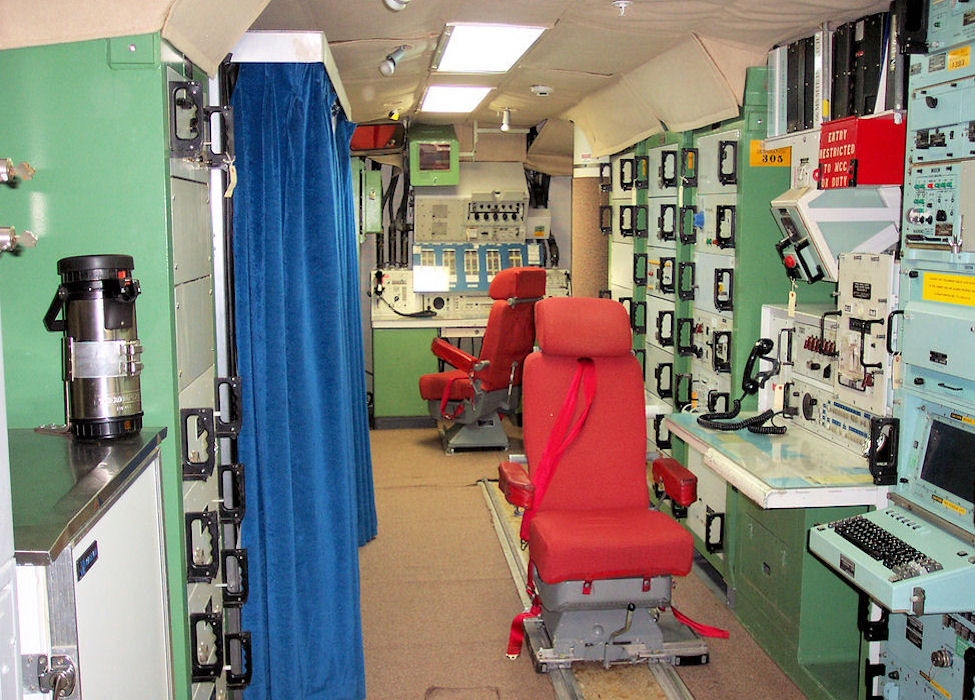
Launch Control Center

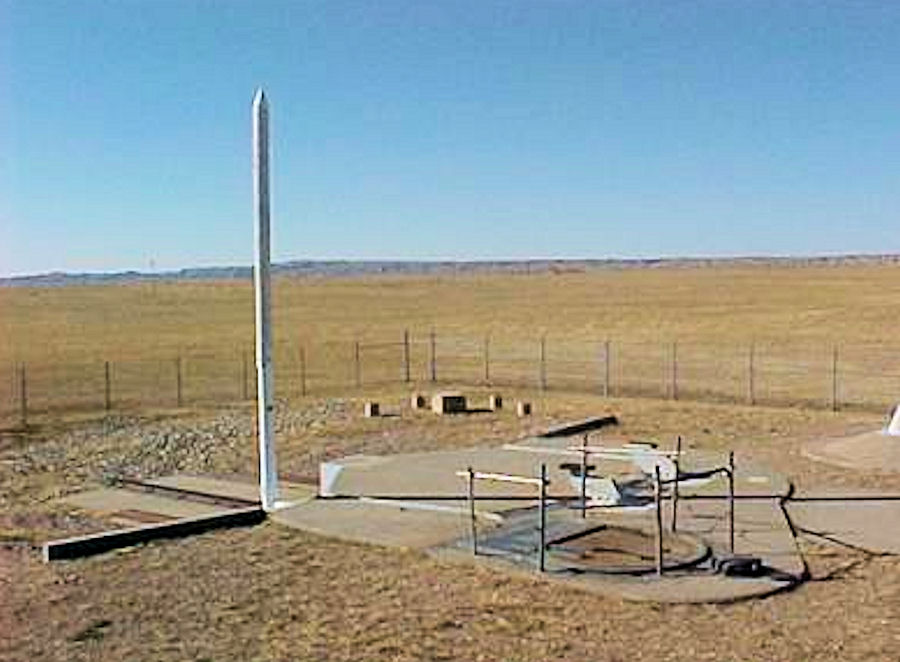
Minuteman III Launch Facility

The Missile Alert Facility (MAF) consists of a buried and hardened Launch Control Center (LCC) and an above-ground Launch Control Support Building (LCSB). MAFs were formerly known as Launch Control Facilities (LCFs) but terminology was changed in 1992 with the inactivation of Strategic Air Command (SAC). In addition, a MAF has a landing pad for helicopters; a large radio tower; a large "top hat" HF antenna; a vehicle garage for security vehicles; recreational facilities, and one or two sewage lagoons. The entire site, except for the helicopter pad and sewage lagoons are secured with a fence and security personnel. About a dozen airmen and officers are assigned to a MAF.

The underground Launch Control Center (LCC) contains the command and control equipment for missile operations. It is staffed by the two launch officers who have primary control and responsibility for the 10 underground and hardened Launch Facilities (LF)s within its flight which contains the operational missile. Each of the five LCCs also has the ability to command and monitor all 50 LFs within the squadron. The LF is unmanned, except when maintenance and security personnel are needed.

A squadron is composed of five flights; flights are designated by a letter of the alphabet with the facilities controlled by the flight being designated by a number, 01 through 11, with 01 being the MAF.

== Units and locations ==
=== 10th Missile Squadron ===
Activated by Strategic Air Command on 1 August 1961. Organized on 1 December 1961

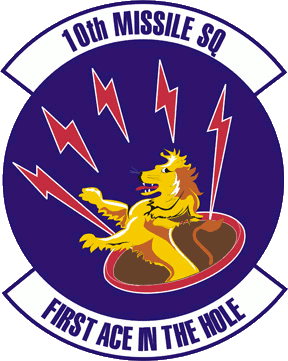
Emblem of the 10th Missile Squadron

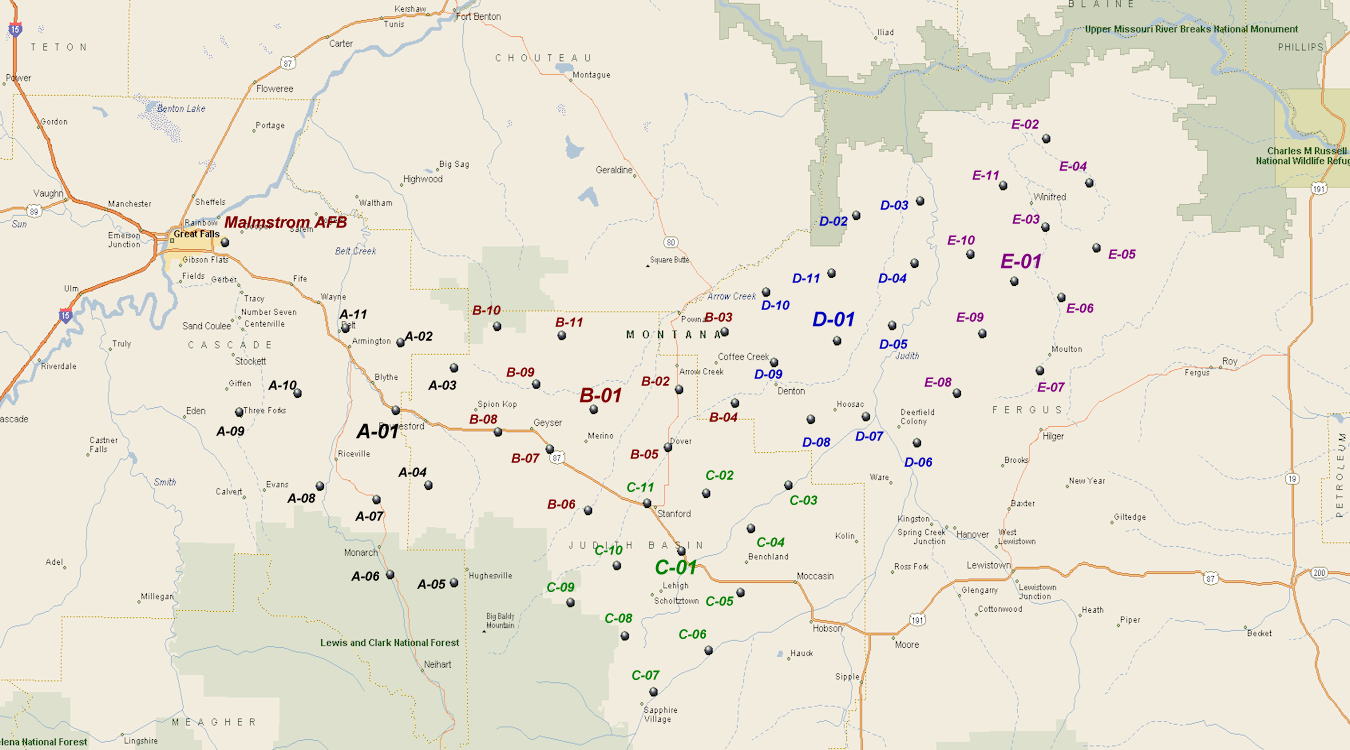
10th Missile Squadron - Missile Alert Facilities and Launch Facilities

- A-01 (MAF) 9.3 mi SE of Belt MT; 24.2 mi SE of Malmstrom AFB
  47°16′54″N 110°48′03″W

A-02 6.3 mi E of Belt MT, 47°22′21″N 110°47′32″W
A-03 12.2 mi ExSE of Belt MT, 47°20′23″N 110°40′21″W
A-04 16.9 mi SxSE of Belt MT, 47°10′56″N 110°43′40″W
A-05 26.1 mi SxSE of Belt MT, 47°03′04″N 110°43′11″W
A-06 23.1 mi SxSE of Belt MT, 47°03′42″N 110°48′38″W
A-07 15.9 mi SxSE of Belt MT, 47°09′45″N 110°50′37″W
A-08 14.5 mi S of Belt MT, 47°10′44″N 110°58′12″W
A-09 13.0 mi SW of Belt MT, 47°16′39″N 111°09′02″W
A-10 7.3 mi SW of Belt MT, 47°18′15″N 111°01′17″W
A-11 0.6 mi NE of Belt MT, 47°23′30″N 110°54′52″W

- B-01 (MAF) 11.3 mi NW of Stanford MT; 41.7 mi ExSE of Malmstrom AFB
  47°17′07″N 110°21′36″W

B-02 11.2 mi NxNE of Stanford MT, 47°18′42″N 110°10′08″W
B-03 17.7 mi NxNE of Stanford MT, 47°23′19″N 110°03′59″W
B-04 12.7 mi NE of Stanford MT, 47°17′39″N 110°02′40″W
B-05 5.7 mi NxNE of Stanford MT, 47°14′04″N 110°11′35″W
B-06 7.2 mi W NxNE of Stanford MT, 47°08′59″N 110°22′16″W
B-07 12.5 mi WxNW of Stanford MT, 47°13′53″N 110°27′26″W
B-08 18.1 mi WxNW of Stanford MT, 47°15′16″N 110°34′25″W
B-09 17.1 mi NW of Stanford MT, 47°19′04″N 110°29′17″W
B-10 23.7 mi NW of Stanford MT, 47°23′44″N 110°34′31″W
B-11 18.8 mi NxNW of Stanford MT, 47°23′00″N 110°25′49″W

- C-01 (MAF) 15.2 mi WxNW of Hobson, MT; 56.0 mi ExSE of Malmstrom AFB
  47°05′44″N 110°09′47″W

C-02 16.3 mi NW of Hobson, MT, 47°10′20″N 110°06′27″W
C-03 13.2 mi N of Hobson, MT, 47°11′11″N 109°55′29″W
C-04 10.9 mi NW of Hobson, MT, 47°07′33″N 110°00′31″W
C-05 8.0 mi WxNW of Hobson, MT, 47°02′23″N 110°01′55″W
C-06 11.1 mi WxSW of Hobson, MT, 46°57′43″N 110°06′10″W
C-07 17.8 mi WxSW of Hobson, MT, 46°54′23″N 110°13′31″W
C-08 19.5 mi W of Hobson, MT, 46°58′52″N 110°17′12″W
C-09 25.4 mi W of Hobson, MT, 47°01′34″N 110°24′34″W
C-10 21.1 mi WxNW of Hobson, MT, 47°04′33″N 110°18′23″W
C-11 20.5 mi WxNW of Hobson, MT, 47°09′33″N 110°14′25″W

- D-01 (MAF) 7.3 mi ExNE of Denton MT; 64.7 mi E of Malmstrom AFB
  47°22′34″N 109°48′52″W

D-02 17.6 mi NxNE of Denton MT, 47°32′38″N 109°46′16″W
D-03 22.5 mi NE of Denton MT, 47°33′47″N 109°37′36″W
D-04 18.1 mi NE of Denton MT, 47°28′47″N 109°38′27″W
D-05 13.1 mi ExNE of Denton MT, 47°23′46″N 109°41′26″W
D-06 15.4 mi ExSE of Denton MT, 47°14′42″N 109°38′13″W
D-07 9.7 mi ExSE of Denton MT, 47°16′28″N 109°45′02″W
D-08 4.8 mi SE of Denton MT, 47°16′17″N 109°52′27″W
D-09 2.0 mi NxNW of Denton MT, 47°20′52″N 109°57′24″W
D-10 8.5 mi N of Denton MT, 47°26′29″N 109°58′23″W
D-11 11.7 mi NxNE of Denton MT, 47°28′03″N 109°49′35″W

- E-01 (MAF) 14.1 mi N of Hilger MT; 82.6 mi E of Malmstrom AFB
  47°27′13″N 109°25′03″W

E-02 27.1 mi N of Hilger MT, 47°38′42″N 109°20′31″W
E-03 18.9 mi N of Hilger MT, 47°31′35″N 109°20′45″W
E-04 23.5 mi NxNE of Hilger MT, 47°35′06″N 109°14′47″W
E-05 17.9 mi NxNE of Hilger MT, 47°29′50″N 109°13′53″W
E-06 11.4 mi NxNE of Hilger MT, 47°24′55″N 109°18′40″W
E-07 5.6 mi NxNE of Hilger MT, 47°20′04″N 109°21′40″W
E-08 9.5 mi WxNW of Hilger MT, 47°18′19″N 109°32′52″W
E-09 11.0 mi NW of Hilger MT, 47°23′06″N 109°29′24″W
E-10 18.0 mi NxNW of Hilger MT, 47°29′29″N 109°30′57″W
E-11 23.0 mi N of Hilger MT, 47°34′57″N 109°26′23″W

=== 12th Missile Squadron ===
Activated by Strategic Air Command on 22 September 1961. Organized on 1 March 1962

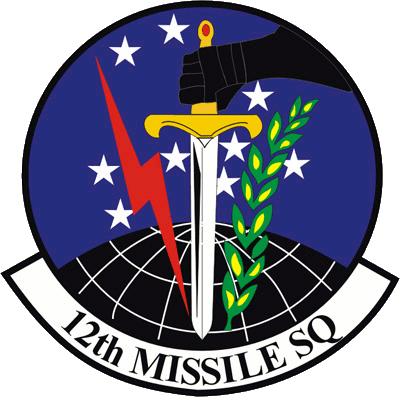
Emblem of the 12th Missile Squadron

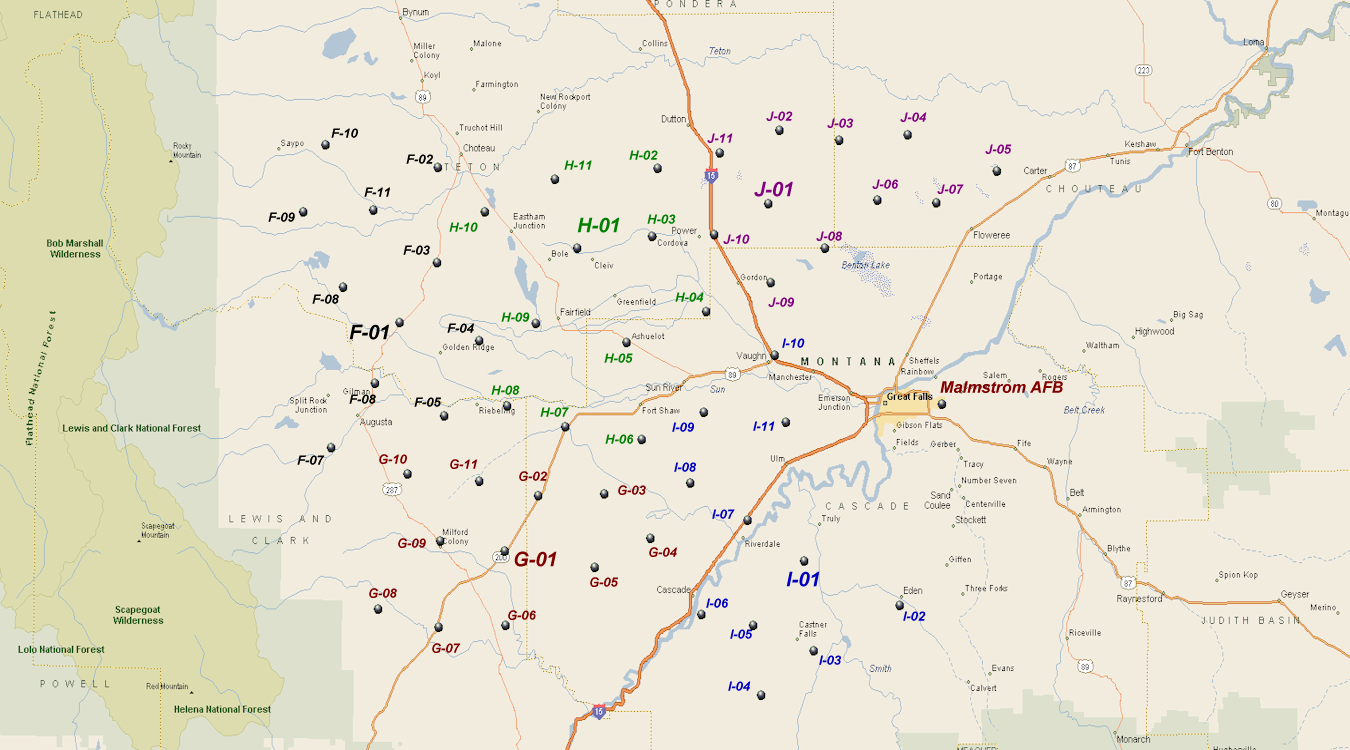
12th Missile Squadron - Missile Alert Facilities and Launch Facilities

- F-01 (MAF) 8.6 mi NxNE of Augusta MT; 53.0 mi W of Malmstrom AFB
  47°36′17″N 112°18′38″W

F-02 22.2 mi NxNE of Augusta MT, 47°47′42″N 112°13′59″W
F-03 14.8 mi NxNE of Augusta MT, 47°40′44″N 112°14′04″W
F-04 13.0 mi ExNE of Augusta MT, 47°35′00″N 112°08′46″W
F-05 8.1 mi E NxNE of Augusta MT, 47°29′24″N 112°13′04″W
F-06 2.9 mi NxNE of Augusta MT, 47°31′46″N 112°21′40″W
F-07 4.0 mi SW of Augusta MT, 47°27′00″N 112°27′01″W
F-08 10.8 mi N of Augusta MT, 47°38′51″N 112°25′39″W
F-09 17.9 mi NxNW of Augusta MT, 47°44′21″N 112°30′46″W
F-10 23.0 mi N of Augusta MT, 47°49′19″N 112°28′04″W
F-11 17.3 mi N of Augusta MT, 47°44′33″N 112°21′59″W

- G-01 (MAF) 13.8 mi SW of Simms MT; 44.7 mi WxSW of Malmstrom AFB
  47°19′32″N 112°05′30″W

G-02 8.1 mi SxSW of Simms MT, 47°23′37″N 112°01′20″W
G-03 6.9 mi SxSE of Simms MT, 47°23′47″N 111°53′07″W
G-04 12.2 mi SxSE of Simms MT, 47°20′28″N 111°47′25″W
G-05 12.9 mi S of Simms MT, 47°18′21″N 111°54′21″W
G-06 19.4 mi SxSW of Simms MT, 47°14′01″N 112°05′18″W
G-07 22.8 mi SW of Simms MT, 47°13′51″N 112°13′33″W
G-08 25.8 mi SW of Simms MT, 47°15′10″N 112°21′04″W
G-09 17.6 mi SW of Simms MT, 47°20′12″N 112°13′27″W
G-10 17.8 mi WxSW of Simms MT, 47°25′07″N 112°17′29″W
G-11 11.6 mi WxSW of Simms MT, 47°24′39″N 112°08′40″W

- H-01 (MAF) 5.9 mi NxNE of Fairfield MT; 37.6 mi WxNW of Malmstrom AFB
  47°41′48″N 111°56′33″W

H-02 15.7 mi NE of Fairfield MT, 47°47′44″N 111°46′35″W
H-03 11.2 mi NE of Fairfield MT, 47°42′41″N 111°47′14″W
H-04 14.1 mi E of Fairfield MT, 47°37′09″N 111°40′33″W
H-05 6.9 mi ExSE of Fairfield MT, 47°34′55″N 111°50′24″W
H-06 13.2 mi SE of Fairfield MT, 47°27′44″N 111°48′34″W
H-07 9.5 mi S of Fairfield MT, 47°28′41″N 111°58′03″W
H-08 9.2 mi SxSW of Fairfield MT, 47°30′11″N 112°05′11″W
H-09 2.4 mi WxSW of Fairfield MT, 47°36′18″N 112°01′42″W
H-10 11.3 mi NW of Fairfield MT, 47°44′27″N 112°08′03″W
H-11 11.6 mi N of Fairfield MT, 47°46′54″N 111°59′21″W

- I-01 (MAF) 11.0 mi ExNE of Cascade MT; 19.7 mi SW of Malmstrom AFB
  47°18′45″N 111°28′25″W

I-02 19.9 mi E of Cascade MT, 47°15′28″N 111°16′39″W
I-03 12.4 mi ExSE of Cascade MT, 47°12′11″N 111°27′18″W
I-04 10.6 mi SE of Cascade MT, 47°08′53″N 111°33′48″W
I-05 6.2 mi ExSE of Cascade MT, 47°14′03″N 111°34′44″W
I-06 2.0 mi NxNE of Cascade MT, 47°17′52″N 111°41′08″W
I-07 8.2 mi NE of Cascade MT, 47°21′48″N 111°35′27″W
I-08 9.5 mi N of Cascade MT, 47°24′31″N 111°42′30″W
I-09 15.6 mi N of Cascade MT, 47°29′45″N 111°40′51″W
I-10 21.8 mi NxNE of Cascade MT, 47°33′57″N 111°32′03″W
I-11 17.2 mi NxNE of Cascade MT, 47°29′00″N 111°30′37″W

- J-01 (MAF) 7.0 mi ExNE of Power MT; 23.5 mi NW of Malmstrom AFB
  47°45′06″N 111°32′46″W

J-02 11.6 mi NE of Power MT, 47°50′30″N 111°31′21″W
J-03 15.6 mi ExNE of Power MT, 47°49′47″N 111°23′51″W
J-04 21.7 mi ExN of Power MT, 47°50′06″N 111°15′18″W
J-05 29.0 mi E of Power MT, 47°47′25″N 111°04′17″W
J-06 17.3 mi E of Power MT, 47°45′18″N 111°19′08″W
J-07 22.9 mi E of Power MT, 47°45′06″N 111°11′48″W
J-08 12.0 mi E of Power MT, 47°41′50″N 111°25′45″W
J-09 7.9 mi ExSE of Power MT, 47°39′19″N 111°32′27″W
J-10 1.3 mi E of Power MT, 47°42′51″N 111°39′29″W
J-11 7.1 mi NxNE of Power MT, 47°48′52″N 111°38′47″W

=== 490th Missile Squadron ===
Activated by Strategic Air Command on 18 December 1961. Organized on 1 May 1962

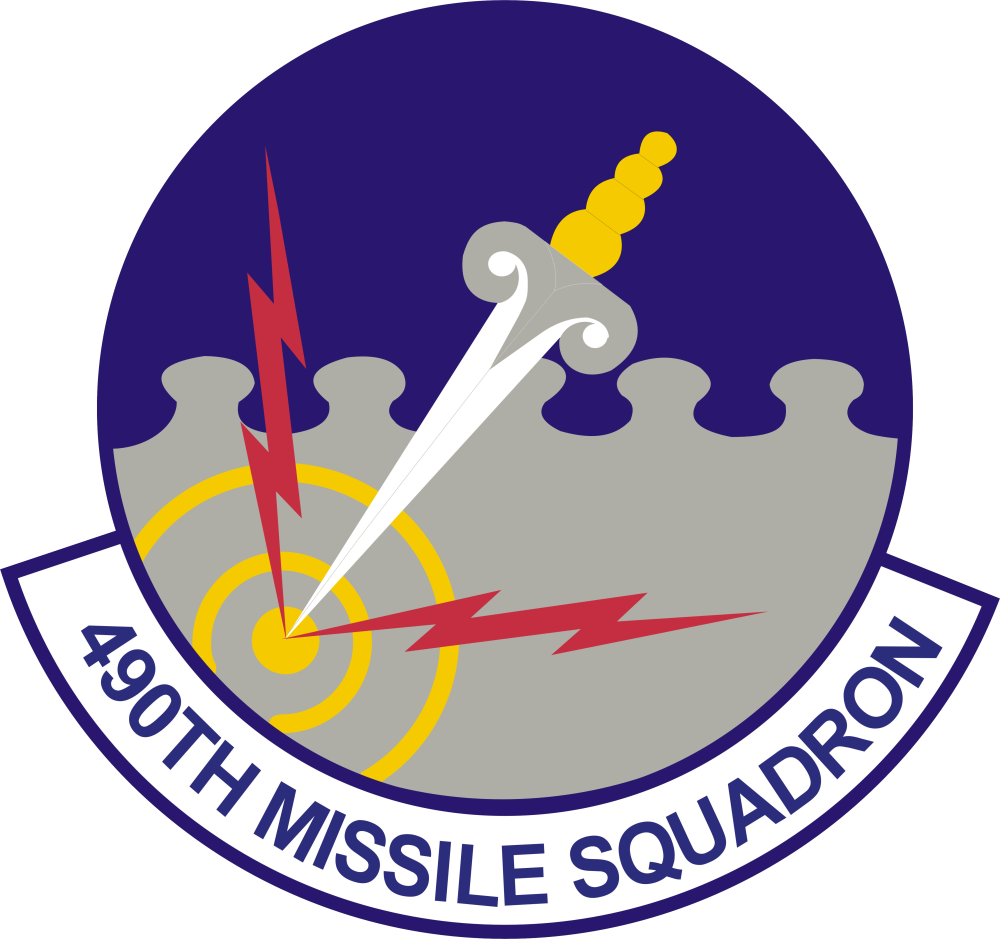
Emblem of the 490th Missile Squadron

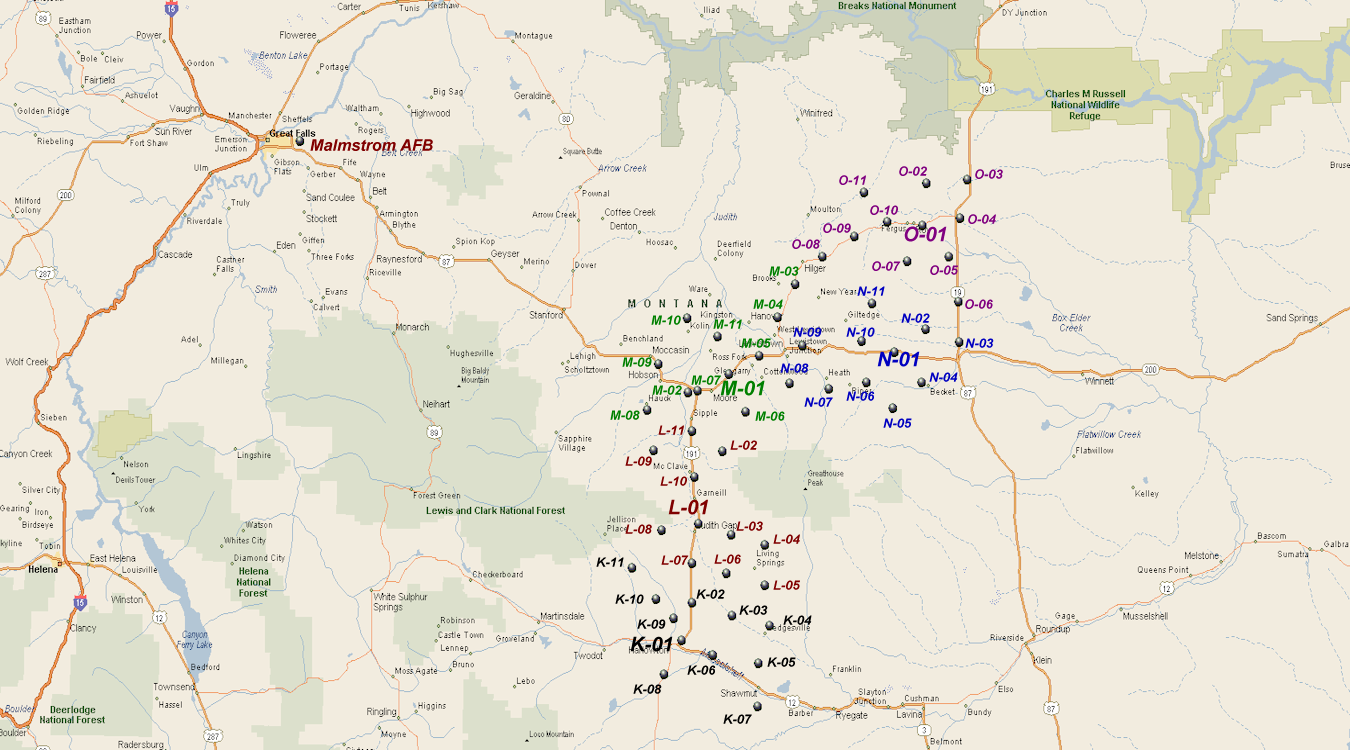
490th Missile Squadron - Missile Alert Facilities and Launch Facilities

- K-01 (MAF) 1.7 mi ExNE of Harlowton MT; 98.7 mi SE of Malmstrom AFB
  46°26′43″N 109°48′05″W

K-02 7.1 mi NxNE of Harlowton MT, 46°31′33″N 109°45′45″W
K-03 11.0 mi ExNE of Harlowton MT, 46°29′48″N 109°37′15″W
K-04 16.8 mi E of Harlowton MT, 46°28′29″N 109°29′07″W
K-05 14.9 mi E of Harlowton MT, 46°23′43″N 109°31′36″W
K-06 7.0 mi ExSE of Harlowton MT, 46°24′43″N 109°41′23″W
K-07 17.2 mi ExSEE of Harlowton MT, 46°18′09″N 109°31′45″W
K-08 4.6 mi SxSW of Harlowton MT, 46°22′17″N 109°51′42″W
K-09 8.6 mi WxNW of Harlowton MT, 46°29′27″N 109°59′47″W
K-10 7.3 mi NxNW of Harlowton MT, 46°31′59″N 109°53′29″W
K-11 13.2 mi NxNW of Harlowton MT, 46°35′58″N 109°58′35″W

- L-01 (MAF) 1.3 mi NxNE of Judith Gap MT; 88.5 mi SE of Malmstrom AFB
  46°41′40″N 109°44′27″W

L-02 12.7 mi NxNE of Judith Gap MT, 46°50′54″N 109°39′15″W
L-03 6.2 mi E of Judith Gap MT, 46°40′12″N 109°37′18″W
L-04 12.0 mi E of Judith Gap MT, 46°38′57″N 109°30′08″W
L-05 13.8 mi SE of Judith Gap MT, 46°33′43″N 109°30′48″W
L-06 8.2 mi SE of Judith Gap MT, 46°35′12″N 109°38′21″W
L-07 4.8 mi S of Judith Gap MT, 46°36′31″N 109°45′43″W
L-08 5.7 mi W of Judith Gap MT, 46°40′47″N 109°52′15″W
L-09 14.0 mi NxNW of Judith Gap MT, 46°51′05″N 109°54′05″W
L-10 8.1 mi N of Judith Gap MT, 46°47′40″N 109°45′10″W
L-11 15.0 mi N of Judith Gap MT, 46°53′36″N 109°45′44″W

- M-01 (MAF) 4.1 mi NE of Moore MT; 80.7 mi ExSE of Malmstrom AFB
  47°00′49″N 109°37′51″W

M-02 18.8 mi NxNE of Moore MT, 47°13′08″N 109°31′01″W
M-03 21.6 mi NE of Moore MT, 47°12′22″N 109°23′17″W
M-04 15.9 mi NE of Moore MT, 47°08′09″N 109°27′15″W
M-05 9.9 mi ExNE of Moore MT, 47°03′11″N 109°31′13″W
M-06 6.6 mi ExSE of Moore MT, 46°56′04″N 109°34′09″W
M-07 2.2 mi W of Moore MT, 46°58′45″N 109°44′31″W
M-08 11.0 mi WxSW of Moore MT, 46°56′18″N 109°55′22″W
M-09 9.8 mi WxNW of Moore MT, 47°02′10″N 109°53′02″W
M-10 11.7 mi NxNW of Moore MT, 47°08′02″N 109°46′48″W
M-11 8.3 mi N of Moore MT, 47°05′40″N 109°40′13″W

- N-01 (MAF) 11.0 mi WxNW of Grassrange MT; 105.7 mi ExSE of Malmstrom AFB
  47°03′33″N 109°01′54″W

N-02 8.1 mi NW of Grassrange MT, 47°06′27″N 108°55′13″W
N-03 4.0 mi N of Grassrange MT, 47°04′46″N 108°47′45″W
N-04 6.4 mi WxSW of Grassrange MT, 46°59′34″N 108°56′04″W
N-05 12.5 mi WxSW of Grassrange MT, 46°56′22″N 109°02′29″W
N-06 15.6 mi W of Grassrange MT, 46°59′43″N 109°08′00″W
N-07 22.1 mi W of Grassrange MT, 46°58′50″N 109°16′14″W
N-08 28.6 mi W of Grassrange MT, 46°59′42″N 109°24′41″W
N-09 26.6 mi W of Grassrange MT, 47°04′28″N 109°21′53″W
N-10 16.8 mi WxNW of Grassrange MT, 47°04′57″N 109°09′02″W
N-11 17.5 mi NW of Grassrange MT, 47°09′52″N 109°06′43″W

- O-01 (MAF) 1.5 mi E of Roy MT; 106.3 mi E of Malmstrom AFB
  47°19′43″N 108°55′37″W

O-02 6.5 mi NxNE of Roy MT, 47°25′13″N 108°54′41″W
O-03 11.3 mi NE of Roy MT, 47°25′35″N 108°45′47″W
O-04 8.0 mi E of Roy MT, 47°20′38″N 108°47′21″W
O-05 7.6 mi SE of Roy MT, 47°15′41″N 108°50′00″W
O-06 13.9 mi SxSE of Roy MT, 47°09′51″N 108°47′45″W
O-07 5.5 mi SxSW of Roy MT, 47°15′10″N 108°59′02″W
O-08 16.1 mi WxSW of Roy MT, 47°15′56″N 109°17′20″W
O-09 10.2 mi W of Roy MT, 47°18′24″N 109°10′28″W
O-10 4.5 mi W of Roy MT, 47°20′16″N 109°03′12″W
O-11 9.7 mi WxNW of Roy MT, 47°24′08″N 109°08′17″W

=== 564th Missile Squadron ===
Activated by Strategic Air Command on 14 December 1965. Organized on 1 April 1966. Inactivated on 19 August 2008

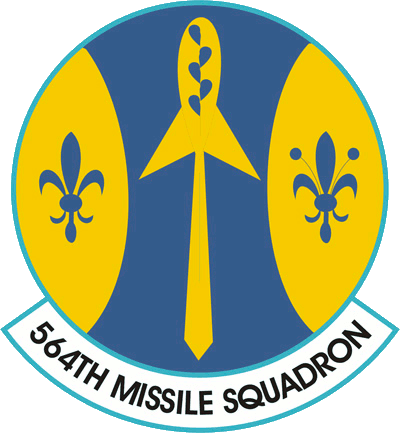
Emblem of the 564th Missile Squadron

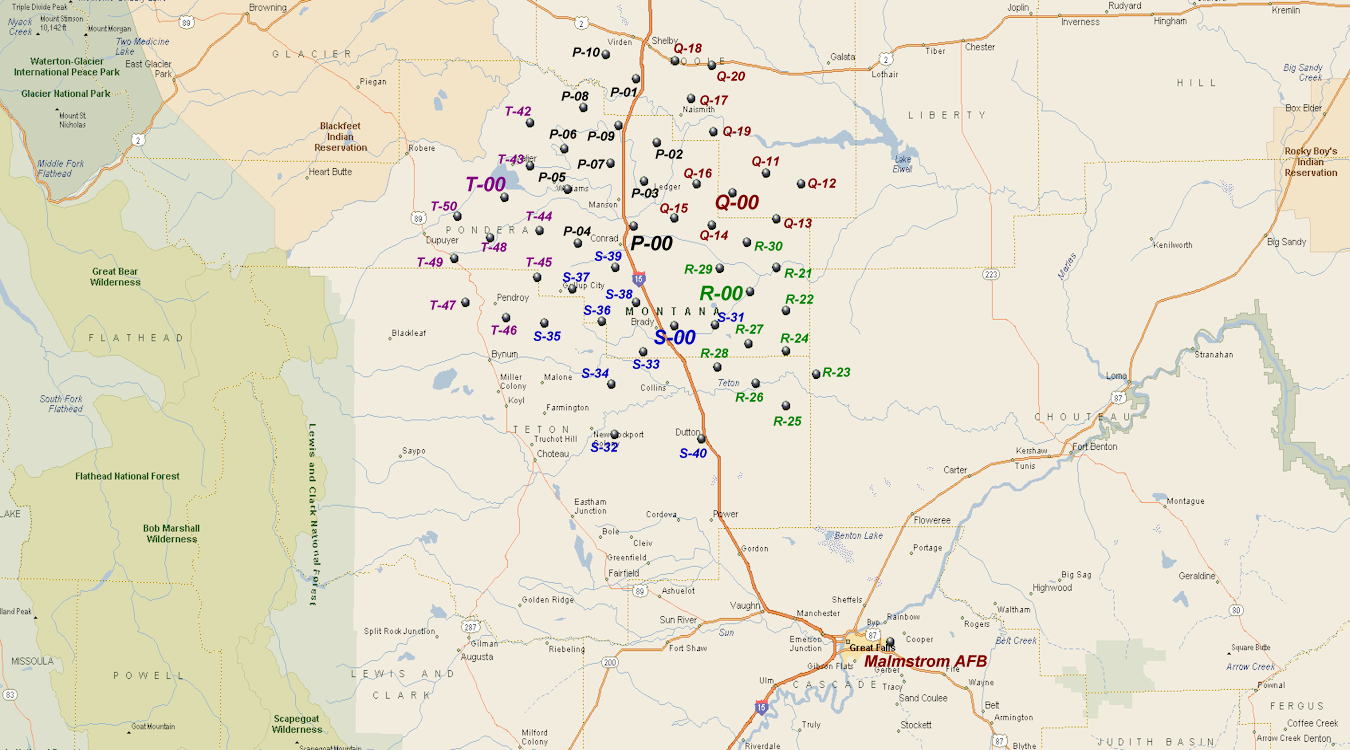
564th Missile Squadron - Missile Alert Facilities and Launch Facilities

- P-00 (MAF) 2.9 mi NE of Conrad MT; 58.3 mi NW of Malmstrom AFB
  48°12′18″N 111°54′31″W

P-01 19.6 mi N of Conrad MT, 48°27′10″N 111°54′06″W
P-02 13.0 mi NxNE of Conrad MT, 48°20′45″N 111°50′33″W
P-03 8.2 mi NxNE of Conrad MT, 48°16′49″N 111°52′46″W
P-04 5.6 mi W of Conrad MT, 48°10′37″N 112°03′59″W
P-05 9.6 mi NW of Conrad MT, 48°16′00″N 112°05′45″W
P-06 13.6 mi NxNW of Conrad MT, 48°20′04″N 112°06′23″W
P-07 9.8 mi N of Conrad MT, 48°18′35″N 111°58′26″W
P-08 16.9 mi NxNW of Conrad MT, 48°24′17″N 112°03′08″W
P-09 14.1 mi N of Conrad MT, 48°22′24″N 111°57′02″W
P-10 22.4 mi N of Conrad MT, 48°29′36″N 111°59′15″W

- Q-00 (MAF) 9.0 mi E of Ledger MT; 55.4 mi NxNW of Malmstrom AFB
  48°15′37″N 111°37′33″W

Q-11 13.6 mi E of Ledger MT, 48°17′39″N 111°31′56″W
Q-12 18.0 mi E of Ledger MT, 48°16′31″N 111°25′58″W
Q-13 15.0 mi ExSE of Ledger MT, 48°13′02″N 111°30′10″W
Q-14 7.3 mi ExSE of Ledger MT, 48°12′24″N 111°41′07″W
Q-15 3.2 mi SxSE of Ledger MT, 48°13′04″N 111°47′35″W
Q-16 4.5 mi ExNE of Ledger MT, 48°16′31″N 111°43′41″W
Q-17 11.6 mi NxNE of Ledger MT, 48°25′11″N 111°44′42″W
Q-18 15.4 mi N of Ledger MT, 48°28′56″N 111°47′26″W
Q-19 9.6 mi NE of Ledger MT, 48°21′45″N 111°40′49″W
Q-20 16.2 mi NxNE of Ledger MT, 48°28′32″N 111°41′03″W

- R-00 (MAF) 12.8 mi ExNE of Brady MT; 44.0 mi NxNW of Malmstrom AFB
  48°05′42″N 111°34′36″W

R-21 17.0 mi ExNE of Brady MT, 48°08′05″N 111°30′07″W
R-22 16.9 mi E of Brady MT, 48°03′47″N 111°28′37″W
R-23 21.5 mi ExSE of Brady MT, 47°57′21″N 111°23′27″W
R-24 17.0 mi E of Brady MT, 47°59′39″N 111°28′35″W
R-25 19.2 mi ExSE of Brady MT, 47°54′08″N 111°28′35″W
R-26 14.4 mi ExSE of Brady MT, 47°56′24″N 111°33′45″W
R-27 12.0 mi E of Brady MT, 48°00′23″N 111°35′01″W
R-28 9.1 mi ExSE of Brady MT, 47°58′03″N 111°40′11″W
R-29 10.6 mi NE of Brady MT, 48°08′03″N 111°39′46″W
R-30 15.3 mi NE of Brady MT, 48°10′41″N 111°35′11″W

- S-00 (MAF) 13.5 mi NxNW of Dutton MT; 45.8 mi NW of Malmstrom AFB
  48°02′14″N 111°47′30″W

S-31 13.4 mi N of Dutton MT, 48°02′23″N 111°40′41″W
S-32 11.4 mi W of Dutton MT, 47°51′18″N 111°57′42″W
S-33 12.6 mi NW of Dutton MT, 47°59′35″N 111°52′45″W
S-34 13.4 mi WxNW of Dutton MT, 47°56′20″N 111°58′16″W
S-35 24.6 mi WxNW of Dutton MT, 48°02′30″N 112°09′34″W
S-36 19.0 mi NW of Dutton MT, 48°02′43″N 111°59′54″W
S-37 24.3 mi NW of Dutton MT, 48°05′57″N 112°04′56″W
S-38 18.0 mi NxNW of Dutton MT, 48°04′37″N 111°54′00″W
S-39 22.9 mi NxNW of Dutton MT, 48°08′06″N 111°57′33″W
S-40 21.3 mi SxSE of Dutton MT, 48°08′33″N 111°51′02″W

- T-00 (MAF) 4.0 mi SxSW of Valier MT; 71.8 mi NW of Malmstrom AFB
  48°15′09″N 112°16′32″W

T-41 9.8 mi N of Valier MT, 48°26′46″N 112°12′34″W
T-42 5.3 mi NxNE of Valier MT, 48°22′41″N 112°12′13″W
T-43 2.2 mi E of Valier MT, 48°18′21″N 112°12′08″W
T-44 8.3 mi SxSE of Valier MT, 48°11′53″N 112°10′28″W
T-45 13.4 mi SxSE of Valier MT, 48°07′07″N 112°10′51″W
T-46 17.8 mi S of Valier MT, 48°03′03″N 112°16′04″W
T-47 17.2 mi SxSW of Valier MT, 48°04′33″N 112°22′59″W
T-48 9.0 mi SxSW of Valier MT, 48°11′05″N 112°18′55″W
T-49 13.4 mi SW of Valier MT, 48°08′59″N 112°25′01″W
T-50 9.5 mi SW of Valier MT, 48°13′11″N 112°24′26″W
