= 783d Bombardment Squadron =

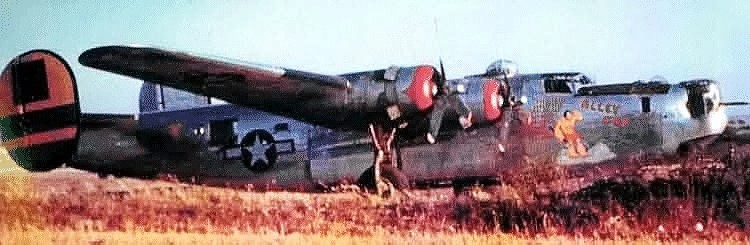
- 465th Bomb Group B-24 Liberator at Pantanella (Note: Aircraft is Consolidated B-24H-15-CF Liberator, serial 41-29347, Alley Oop. This plane was lost on 28 July 1944, on a mission over Yugoslavia. Baugher, Joe (18 April 2023). "1941 USAF Serial Numbers". Joe Baugher., Missing Air Crew Report 7106.)
- Active: 1943–1945
- Country: United States
- Branch: United States Air Force
- Role: Bombardment
- Motto: Quid Fit (Latin for 'What's Done')
- Engagements: Mediterranean Theater of Operations
- Decorations: Distinguished Unit Citation

Insignia
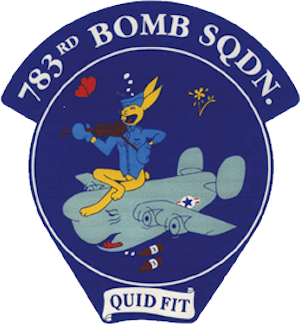
- Unofficial 783d Bombardment Squadron emblem

The 783d Bombardment Squadron was activated in 1943. After organizing and training with Consolidated B-24 Liberators in the United States. It served in combat in the Mediterranean Theater of Operations as a heavy bomber unit in the strategic bombing campaign against Germany. The squadron earned two Distinguished Unit Citations for its actions. After V-E Day, the squadron served in Air Transport Command, ferrying men from the combat theater back to the United States until inactivating in July 1945.

== History ==
The squadron was first activated at Alamogordo Army Air Field, New Mexico as the 783d Bombardment Squadron, one of the four original Consolidated B-24 Liberator heavy bomber squadrons of the 465th Bombardment Group. After training under Second Air Force, the squadron deployed to the Mediterranean Theater of Operations in February 1944.

The squadron arrived in the Mediterranean Theater of Operations, where it was stationed at Pantanella Airfield, Italy in March 1944. The air echelon halted in Tunisia for additional training before completing its move to Italy, where it became part of Fifteenth Air Force. It flew strategic bombardment combat missions over France, Germany, Italy, Austria and the Balkans, attacking targets such as marshalling yards, docks, aircraft factories and oil production facilities. On 8 July 1944 the squadron attacked an oil refinery and marshalling yards near Vienna, Austria despite heavy flak and fighter opposition, earning the unit a Distinguished Unit Citation. It was awarded a second citation for an attack on 3 August 1944 against a steel plant in Friedrichshafen, Germany.

The squadron was occasionally diverted from the strategic campaign. It attacked troop concentrations in May 1944 to assist partisan forces in Yugoslavia and performed interdiction missions to support the advance on Rome. Prior to Operation Dragoon, the invasion of southern France, it attacked bridges, railroads and gun emplacements near the landing area. It supported Red Army and Romanian Army forces advancing in the Balkans in October 1944 and Allied forces in Northern Italy in April 1945.

The squadron moved to Waller Field, Trinidad and became part of Air Transport Command in June 1945. It used its Liberators as transports, flying personnel from Trinidad to Florida. The unit was inactivated in Trinidad during July 1945. The squadron was redesignated as very heavy bomber squadron in 1945, but remained inactive.

== Lineage ==
- Constituted as the 783d Bombardment Squadron, Heavy on 19 May 1943

Activated on 1 August 1943
Inactivated on 31 July 1945

=== Assignments ===
- 465th Bombardment Group, 1 August 1943 – 31 July 1945

=== Stations ===
- Alamogordo Army Air Field, New Mexico, 1 August 1943
- Kearns Army Air Base, Utah, c. 13 September 1943
- McCook Army Air Field, Nebraska, c. 5 October 1943 – 1 February 1944
- Pantanella Airfield, Italy, 15 March 1944 – June 1945
- Waller Field, Trinidad, c. 15 June – 31 July 1945

=== Aircraft ===
- Consolidated B-24 Liberator, 1943–1945

=== Awards and campaigns ===
Award streamer	Award	Dates	Notes
	Distinguished Unit Citation	8 July 1944	Vienna, Austria, 783d Bombardment Squadron
	Distinguished Unit Citation	3 August 1944	Germany, 783d Bombardment Squadron

Campaign Streamer	Campaign	Dates	Notes
	Air Offensive, Europe	15 March 1944 – 5 June 1944	783d Bombardment Squadron
	Air Combat, EAME Theater	15 March 1944 – 11 May 1945	783d Bombardment Squadron
	Central Europe	22 March 1944 – 21 May 1945	783d Bombardment Squadron
	Rome-Arno	10 April 1944 – 9 September 1944	783d Bombardment Squadron
	Normandy	6 June 1944 – 24 July 1944	783d Bombardment Squadron
	Northern France	25 July 1944 – 14 September 1944	783d Bombardment Squadron
	Southern France	15 August 1944 – 14 September 1944	783d Bombardment Squadron
	North Apennines	10 September 1944 – 4 April 1945	783d Bombardment Squadron
	Rhineland	15 September 1944 – 21 March 1945	783d Bombardment Squadron
	Po Valley	3 April 1945 – 8 May 1945	783d Bombardment Squadron
