= Waller Air Force Base =

Air base in Trinidad and Tobago

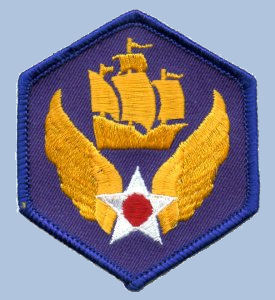
Waller Air Force Base
- Part of Sixth Air Force
- Arima, Trinidad and Tobago

Site information
- Type: Military airfield
- Controlled by: United States Air Force

Location
- Location within Trinidad and Tobago
- Coordinates: 10°36′48.87″N 061°12′48.30″W

Site history
- Built: 1941
- In use: 1941-1949

Waller Air Force Base is a former United States Air Force World War II air base located in northeastern Trinidad. It is located about 7 km southeast of Downtown Arima south of the Churchill-Roosevelt Highway and roughly 32 km from the capital city Port of Spain.

== History ==
The American rights to the airfield were obtained via the Destroyers for Bases Agreement in September 1940, when the United States transferred fifty destroyers to Great Britain in exchange for Army and Navy base rights on British possessions in the Americas.

In 1941, Trinidad was alarmed by a large number of Nazi U-boats prowling off its coastline, intent on disrupting British shipping in the Caribbean Sea, and using the Vichy French controlled island of Martinique as a possible supply facility. Although the first United States Army personnel arrived on Trinidad on 24 April 1941, it was only after the United States' entry into the war, that Allied planners, in early 1942, decided to counter the Nazi threat by establishing major air and naval facilities on Trinidad, Naval Base Trinidad.

Waller Army Airfield was activated on 1 September 1941 with the assignment of the 92d Service Group. The unit's mission was to establish a flying facility within the United States Army Fort Read post. The unit consisted of the group's Headquarters, and the 92d Air Base and 309th Material Squadrons. The group was assigned to the Caribbean Air Force.

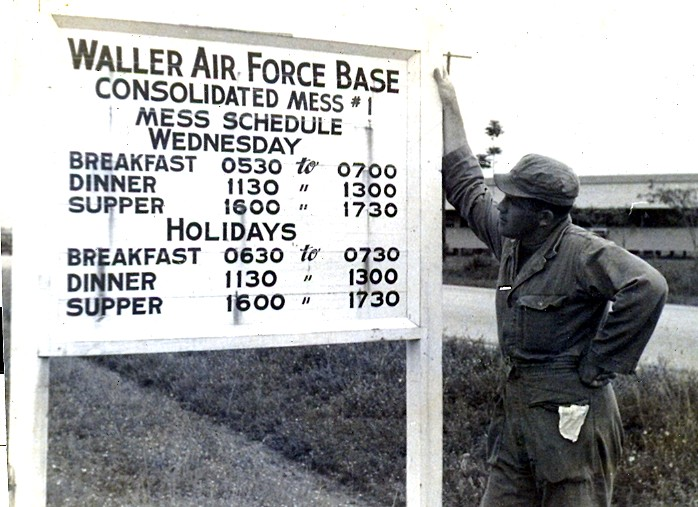
Sign for Waller AFB mess hall

Waller Field was named after United States Army Air Corps Major Alfred J. Waller, a distinguished World War I combat pilot, killed in the crash of a Consolidated PB-2A at Langley Field on 11 December 1937. The airfield was intended to have four runways, but the two southern ones were cancelled due to the nature of the ground.

Waller was built to be the premier US combat airbase in Trinidad, but events overtook the plan. The South Atlantic Air Route to Europe quickly developed and became the most often used method of getting aircraft to the African and European theaters of war. Air Transport Command flew aircraft to Waller from South Florida airfields, then from Waller, aircraft were flown to Belem Airfield, Brazil, then across the South Atlantic Ocean to Freetown Airport, Sierra Leone and then to North Africa or England. Airfield congestion at Waller became so acute that the combat aircraft, the bombers actually confronting the U-boats, had to be moved out to Edinburgh (Carlsen) Airfield when it was completed.

With the establishment of United States bases on Trinidad and other Caribbean islands, the Nazi menace was eliminated by the action of numerous air and naval patrols. In 1943, President Roosevelt visited Waller Field on his return from the Casablanca Conference in North Africa.

== Major units assigned ==
- Headquarters, Trinidad Wing, Antilles Air Command, 15 May 1943 – 15 March 1944
- XXXVI Fighter Command, 21 August 1942 – 30 April 1943
- 9th Bombardment Group (Headquarters), 30 October 1941 – 31 October 1942

1st Bombardment Squadron, 29 October 1941 – 23 October 1942 (B-18 Bolo)

- 10th Bombardment Squadron (25th Bombardment Group), 1 October-11 December 1943 (B-18 Bolo)
- 101st Bombardment (Photographic) Squadron (72d Reconnaissance Group), 8 August 1942 – 26 February 1944 (B-18 Bolo)
- 22d Fighter Squadron (36th Fighter Group) (P-40 Warhawk)

Deployed to Waller from: Vega Paja AAF, Puerto Rico, 6 December 1941-October 1942
Assigned to Waller:, October 1942-27 May 1943

Detachment deployed to: Dakota Field, Aruba, 2 September 1942-April 1943
Detachment deployed to: Curaçao, 2 September 1942-April 1943
Detachment deployed to: Zandery Field, Surinam, 16 September 1942-April 1943

- 60th Troop Carrier Group (Headquarters), 4 June-31 July 1945

10th, 11th, 12th, 28th Troop Carrier Squadrons, 4 June-31 July 1945 (C-47)

- 61st Troop Carrier Group (Headquarters), 29 May-31 July 1945

14th, 15th, 53d, 59th Troop Carrier Squadrons, 29 May-31 July 1945 (C-47)

- 64th Troop Carrier Group (Headquarters), 4 June-31 July 1945

16th, 17th, 18th Troop Carrier Squadrons, 4 June-31 July 1945 (C-47)

- 315th Troop Carrier Group (Headquarters), May-31 July 1945

35th, 43d, 309th 315th Troop Carrier Squadron, 4 June-31 July 1945 (C-47)

- 20th Troop Carrier Squadron, 22 December 1941 – 1 December 1943 (C-47)

Assigned to: Panama Air Depot, 22 December 1941 – 5 June 1942
Assigned to: Sixth Air Force Base Command, 5 June 1942 – 1 December 1943

- 460th Bombardment Group* (Headquarters), 15–30 June 1945

760th, 761st, 762d, 763d Bombardment Squadrons, 15–30 June 1945

- 464th Bombardment Group* (Headquarters), June-31 July 1945

776th, 777th, 778th, 779th, Bombardment Squadrons, 15 June-31 July 1945

- 465th Bombardment Group* (Headquarters), 15 June-31 July 1945

780th, 781st, 782d, 783d, Bombardment Squadrons, 15 June-31 July 1945

*Reassigned from Fifteenth Air Force in Italy and used B-24 Liberator aircraft as transports moving personnel from Mediterranean Theater to the United States

In addition to the combat and transport flying units, Waller Field was also used as an aircraft maintenance and supply facility by the 24th Air Depot (Air Technical Service Command) which was deployed from Kelly Field, Texas on 20 January 1942. It was also used as a long-range reconnaissance base by several photo-recon squadrons.

== Postwar use ==
With the end of World War II Waller Airfield was reduced in scope to a skeleton staff. It was redesignated Waller Air Force Base on 26 March 1948, by the Department of the Air Force General Order Number 10.

Its primary use was by Military Air Transport Service (MATS) as a transit facility under the 24th Composite Wing based at Borinquen AFB, Puerto Rico and by the MATS 6th Weather Squadron (Regional), which provided meteorological reports for aviation in the South Caribbean as well as tropical storm and hurricane reporting. President Harry S. Truman stopped at Waller Field on 31 August 1947 on his way to Brazil during a South American visit.

Waller AFB was closed on 28 May 1949 due to budgetary cutbacks and MATS operations were shifted to bases in the Panama Canal Zone.

After the base's closure, it became the informal home of various types of racing (using former airstrips) for over 40 years. Today construction progresses on the former airfield site of the Tamana InTech Park, a science and technology park for industries, several housing developments, and the new University of Trinidad and Tobago campus complex.
