= South Atlantic Wing, Air Transport Command =

Former US Army Air Forces unit

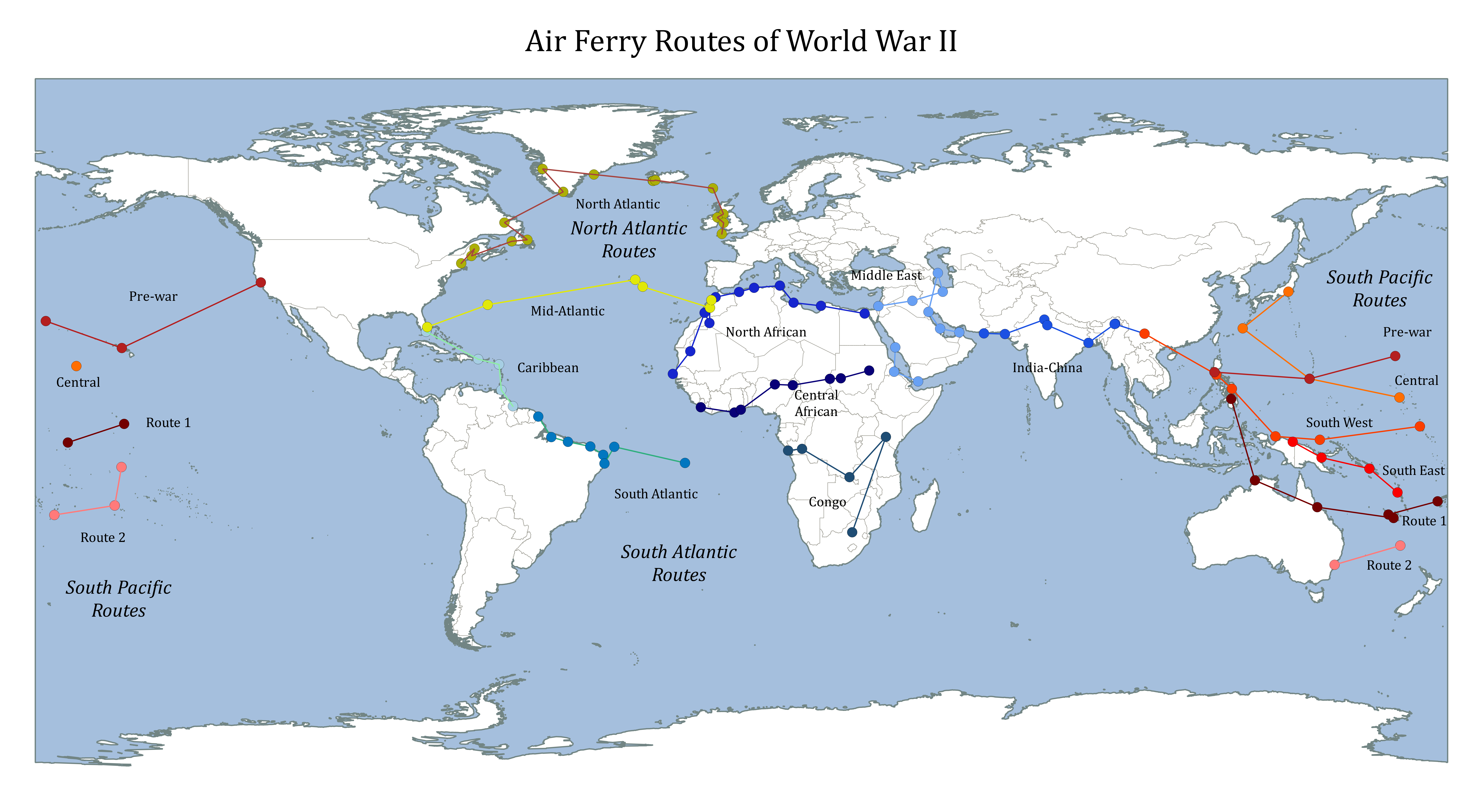
- Air ferry routes of World War II (South Atlantic Wing stations in light blue)
- Active: 1942–1946
- Country: United States
- Branch: United States Air Force
- Role: Strategic airlift
- Engagements: American Theater (World War II)

The South Atlantic Wing, Air Transport Command is a former United States Army Air Forces unit. It was organized in 1942 to ferry aircraft and transport personnel and equipment from the Caribbean to the Mediterranean Theater of Operations, European Theater of Operations, China-Burma-India Theater and for delivery of lend lease aircraft to the Soviet Union. It also transported critical material from South America. The wing commander also served as the United States Army theater commander for South America. After V-E Day, the wing became responsible for the return of aircraft and personnel to the United States. It was inactivated in 1946 as operations in the South Atlantic decreased.

== History ==
=== Origins ===
The origins of the wing date to January 1942, when Air Corps Ferrying Command informally organized sectors under its Foreign Division to provide control officers at various points on its overseas routes for ferrying aircraft. It established a sector at West Palm Beach, Florida on 23 January. The West Palm Beach Sector was formally established on 14 February and renamed the South Atlantic Sector in April. However, the relationship between the sector headquarters and the control officers at the stations along the routes in its area of responsibility remained unclear.

In the spring of 1942, a reorganization of the Foreign Wing (Note: The Foreign Division had been formally organized in February as the Foreign Wing, Air Corps Ferry Command.) contemplated the addition of regularly scheduled airlift service to the ferrying mission of the sector, accompanied by a transition of scheduled service from airline to military personnel. The new, expanded organizations would also be responsible for the service and maintenance of aircraft, communications and flight supervision at stations under their control. This plan was implemented in June 1942, with the South Atlantic Sector split between the 27th Wing at West Palm Beach and the 24th Army Air Forces Ferrying Wing, which was activated at Georgetown, British Guiana on 26 June 1942. Within a few days, the Ferrying Command had become Air Transport Command (ATC) and the wing, the South Atlantic Wing, Air Transport Command.

Prior to the entry of either the United States or Brazil into World War II, in January 1941, negotiations began for American use of airfields for military use in northern Brazil. These negotiations were carried out by Pan American Airways through its subsidiary Panair do Brasil, to give them the appearance of being for commercial airfields. Panair proposed improvements to a number of airports in northern Brazil, which would include construction of facilities to support commercial use of the fields, but which could be easily converted to military use. The Brazilian government agreed to these improvements in July 1941. Development of the fields by Panair continued through May 1942, when the United States and Brazil entered into an agreement permitting the United States to construct defense installations in Brazil and to use existing Brazilian military installations. All installations would be Brazilian military bases.

=== Operations ===
==== Initial operations ====
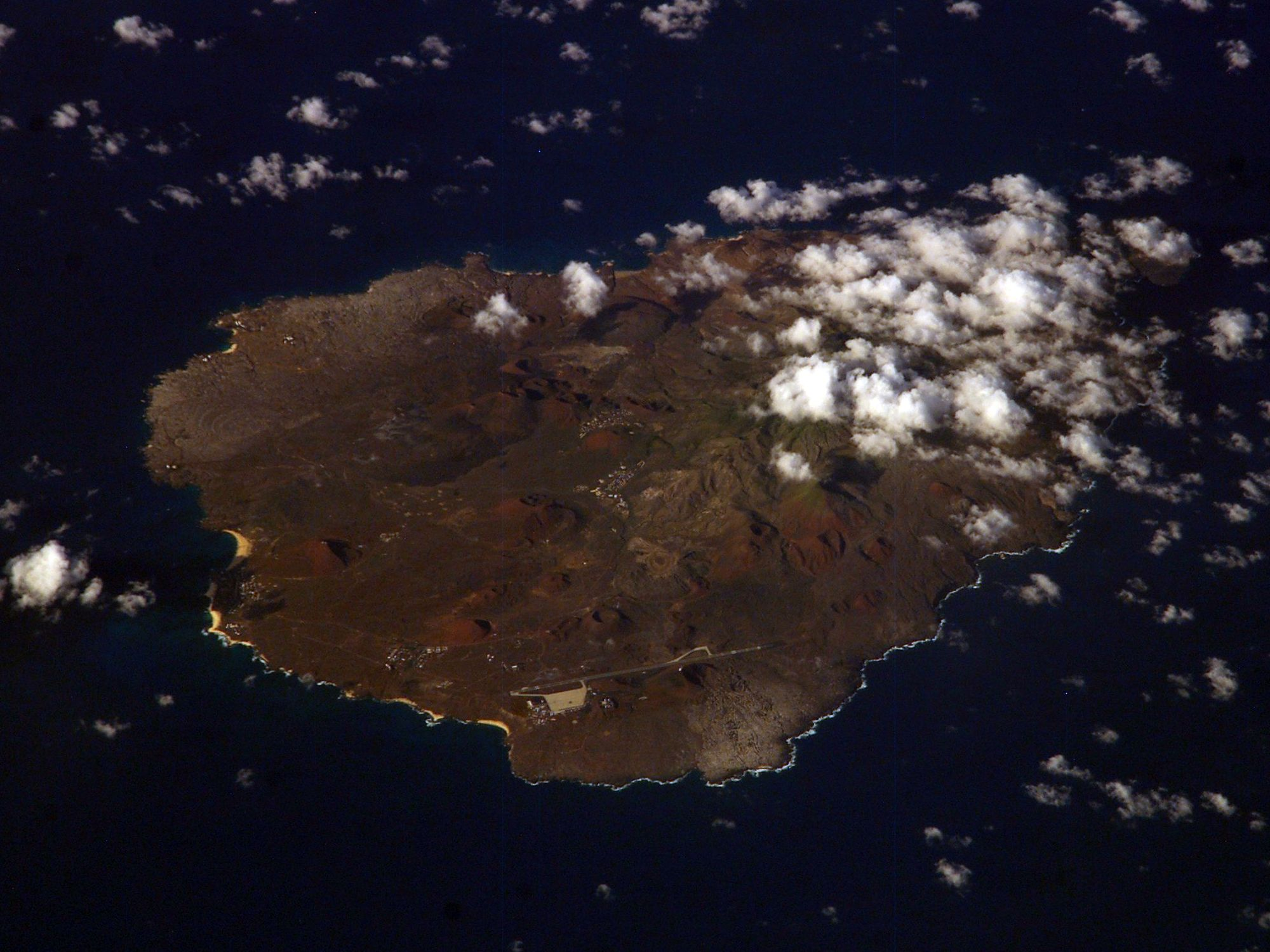
Wideawake Field on Ascension Island

The wing's original area of responsibility extended from Trinidad in the Caribbean to Ascension Island in the middle of the Atlantic. However, the wing's boundary with the Caribbean Wing, Air Transport Command was adjusted to coincide with the boundary of the Antilles Air Command. Atkinson Field in British Guinea and Waller Field on Trinidad were transferred to Caribbean Wing and headquarters soon moved to Parnamirim Field, near Natal, Brazil. At the same time, the United States Army Forces in South America was established and the wing commander also assumed the duties of a theater commander. The wing's South Atlantic route was used for ferrying and transport to the Mediterranean Theater of Operations, European Theater of Operations, China-Burma-India Theater and for delivery of lend lease aircraft to the Soviet Union.

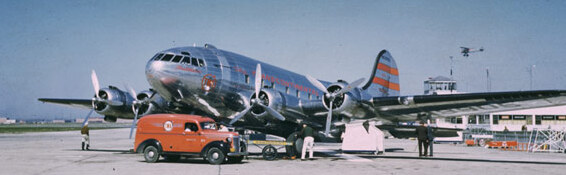
TWA Stratoliner

Initial scheduled service on the wing's routes included Douglas DC-3 service by Pan American and Eastern Air Lines to Natal (originating in Miami) and Boeing 307 Stratoliner service by Transcontinental and Western Air between Washington, D.C. and Cairo. Pan American Air Ferries, also was using the route to deliver aircraft to the Royal Air Force (RAF) in the Middle East. RAF aircraft were also ferried by military crews, as were North American B-25 Mitchells and Douglas A-20 Havocs for the Soviet Union, although as the war progressed, the Alaskan route was preferred for Soviet aircraft. The first large scale movement of American aircraft along the wing's route was the flight of the 98th Bombardment Group in July. The 98th's heavy bombers were able to cross the Atlantic non stop, so the first use of the new Wideawake Field on Ascension Island was by the Mitchells of the 12th Bombardment Group. Much of the wing's efforts in 1942 were directed at the reinforcement of Ninth Air Force.

During 1942, however, the scheduled services were not functioning well. Large backups of materiel and mail were occurring along the wing's routes, especially at Natal. The main reason was a lack of transport aircraft. As the wing began operations, only four Consolidated B-24D Liberators, two Statocruisers and four Pan American Clippers were available to move supplies to Africa from Natal. The South Atlantic route was given the highest priority for heavy transport aircraft. American Airlines began to operate the first Douglas C-54 Skymasters from Miami to Natal, and Consolidated C-87 Liberator Express aircraft began to join the fleet, and 26 aircraft were in use on the transatlantic segment by the end of the year.

==== Operation Torch ====
In the preparation for Operation Torch, the wing participated in the movement of five groups of light and medium bombers to provide immediate reinforcement after the amphibious landings in North Africa. (Note: The groups were the 67th Observation Group and 17th, 27th, 320th and 321st Bombardment Groups. Carter, p. 65.) Reinforcements for Twelfth Air Force also ferried their planes via the South Atlantic Wing's routes. As winter weather set in, light and medium bombers destined for England were encountering severe problems navigating the North Atlantic Ferry Route and were diverted to the South Atlantic. By December, the North Atlantic route was also closed to heavy bombers, so reinforcements for Eighth Air Force also ferried their planes via the South Atlantic Wing's routes. By February 1943, facilities were available at Dakar, Senegal so that heavy bombers could fly there directly from Natal, cutting two or three stops off their route. By the spring of 1943, the North Atlantic route was again opened for bombers.

==== Expanded operations ====
The spring of 1943 saw the first movement of fighter aircraft through the wing's routes, as five groups of Lockheed P-38 Lightnings were ferried to fighter and photographic reconnaissance units. Although the North Atlantic Route remained open to a limited extent in winter of the war's following years, most aircraft were diverted to the South Atlantic during this period of adverse weather. Unit moves along the wing's routes continued into 1944, but ferrying operations shifted more toward the movement of individual replacement aircraft movements as the war progressed.

Not all traffic was eastbound. Ferry pilots returned after making their deliveries, and a few "war weary" planes were also returned. (Note: Return of "war weary" aircraft was not popular. The combat commands that had used the planes were not happy to expend resources to maintain them, and the ferry pilots assigned to return them did not trust the safety of the planes.) However, the largest segment of passenger traffic westbound was aeromedical evacuation of wounded soldiers. No planes were dedicated to this mission, and evacuation got off to a slow start in early 1943. The wing was also responsible for the air transport of certain strategic materials, whose scarcity and need justified rapid transportation. In particular beryl, a mineral used in the manufacture of delicate instruments, and tantalite, used in radio and radar sets, were both transported from Brazil. Special alloys from the Belgian Congo and rotenone from South America were transported through the wing's routes. In the early days of the wing, rubber was also carried on otherwise empty planes returning to the States.

The wing was originally established with its personnel assigned to two groups, whose squadrons were spread among the bases operated by the wing. However, the wing's manpower requirements varied from base to base, depending on the size and nature of its operations. In October 1943, the wing's remaining group was inactivated and the wing began manning by "exact manning tables." Under this system, manning requirements were measured on a functional basis and rather than being assigned to a group or squadron, personnel were assigned directly to a numbered station. Army Air Force Base Units replaced the numbered stations in 1944. (Note: The AAF Base Unit system had been adopted for support units in the United States in the spring of 1944. Air Transport Command expanded its use overseas. Goss, p. 75.)

in July 1944, the expanded activity of the wing led to it becoming the South Atlantic Division, Air Transport Command. However, when Air Transport Command was able to secure landing rights in the Azores later in 1944, a shorter route middle Atlantic became available between North America and Africa that permitted four engine and some twin engine planes to bypass of the wing's area of responsibility en route to Africa and eastbound activity on the division's routes began to lessen.

==== White and Green Projects ====
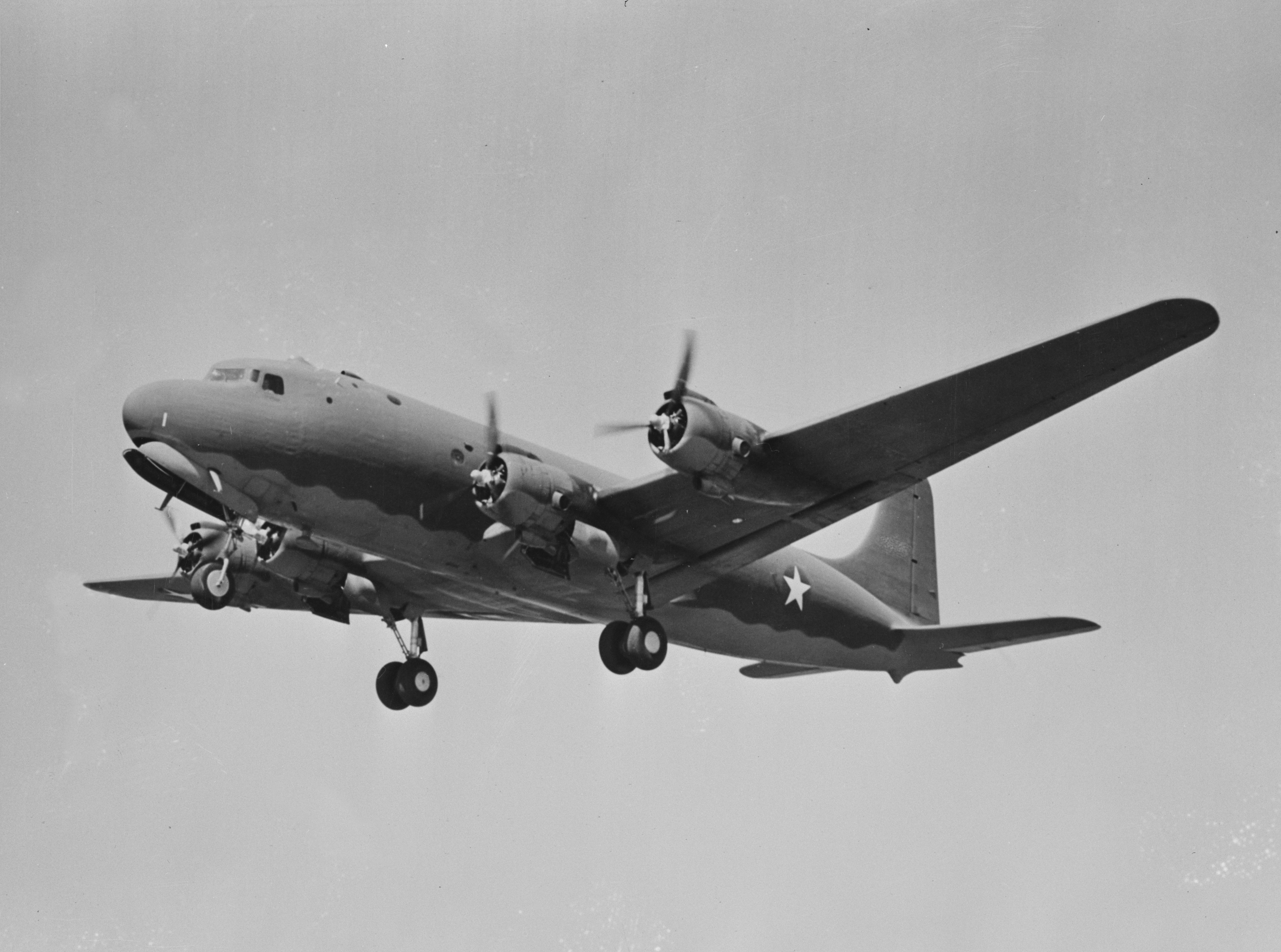
Douglas C-54

The Air Staff outlined a general plan for redeployment of forces from the European and Mediterranean Theaters to the United States in September 1944. This plan was named the White Project. Planes being redeployed were flown by their combat crews with a few passengers on board, (Note: The passengers were primarily maintenance and support personnel for the planes.) but under the control of ATC. While most planes would return via the North Atlantic route or the new Central Atlantic route, plans called for 25 bombers a day to come under the control of the South Atlantic Wing on their return flights. The flow of aircraft to the theaters ended in April 1945. A month later, on 20 May, the first bombers took off for the United States. Return of heavy bombers was essentially completed in July, while movement of twin-engine planes continued into August. Some 2,282 planes passed through the wing's control (Note: All returning B-25s, most A-26s and a majority of the C-47s used the South Atlantic route. Heck, p. 215.) with a final contingent of B-17s finally returning in September. Although the White Project was directed at repositioning aircraft and their crews, over 33,000 passengers were able to hitch rides on returning aircraft.

The War Department directed ATC to prepare for the Green Project in April 1945. This project called for the transportation of 50,000 passengers a month from Europe to the United States. 40% of these passengers would return via the South Atlantic route. To assist the division, it was augmented by the 460th Bombardment Group, (Note: Command wide, 33,000 men were suddenly transferred in for this project. Heck, p. 216.) plus additional individuals who had formerly been assigned to combat units. The withdrawal of Fourth Fleet from the Atlantic made former Navy facilities at Belém and Natal available to the division for housing troops. C-47s from four troop carrier groups were made available for transporting troops from Natal. Their pilots were assigned individually, but the division found that they required additional training before assigning them to the project. Inbound traffic from Dakar to Natal was mostly C-54s, while flights from Natal to Atkinson Field were in C-47s or Curtiss C-46 Commandos flown by Eastern Airlines contract pilots. (Note: A lucky few flew continued from Natal direct to Miami on C-54s.) By August, shipping in the Atlantic had become available to transport most troops back to the United States, and Project Green, which was programmed to last until April 1946, was terminated on 10 September 1945.

=== Inactivation ===
With the completion of the White and Green Projects, the South Atlantic Division once more became a wing in September 1945, and it was assigned to the Atlantic Division, Air Transport Command. Three of its stations in Brazil ended operations the following month, and by January 1946, the wing operated only a single station in Brazil, plus Ascension Island. The wing was inactivated at the end of June and its remaining units assigned directly to the Atlantic Division.

== Lineage ==
- Constituted as the 24th Army Air Forces Ferrying Wing on 12 June 1942

Activated on 26 June 1942
Redesignated South Atlantic Wing, Air Transport Command on 5 July 1942
Redesignated South Atlantic Division, Air Transport Command on 1 July 1944
Redesignated South Atlantic Wing, Air Transport Command on 20 September 1945
Inactivated on 30 June 1946

=== Assignments ===
- Army Air Forces Ferry Command (later Air Transport Command), 26 June 1942
- Atlantic Division, Air Transport Command, 20 September 1945 – 30 June 1946

=== Components ===
==== Groups ====
- 9th Ferrying Group (later 9th Transport Group): c. 9 July 1942 – 10 October 1943
- 10th Ferrying Group: c. 9 July 1942 – c. November 1942
- 460th Bombardment Group: 15 June 1945 – 26 September 1945

==== Squadrons ====
- 12th Airways Communications Squadron: c. 1 May 1943 – c. 31 July 1943
- 22d Weather Squadron: 1 July 1943 – 1 December 1943
- 808th Medical Air Evacuation Squadron: October 1943 – 4 November 1944

==== Stations ====
- Station 1, South Atlantic Wing: 10 October 1943 – 1 August 1944 Natal, Brazil
- Station 2, South Atlantic Wing: 10 October 1943 – 1 August 1944 Parnamirim Field, Brazil
- Station 3, South Atlantic Wing: 10 October 1943 – 1 August 1944 Adjiacento Airfield, Brazil
- Station 4, South Atlantic Wing: 10 October 1943 – 1 August 1944 Val de Cans Airport, Brazil
- Station 5, South Atlantic Wing: 10 October 1943 – 1 August 1944 Tirirical Airport, Brazil
- Station 6, South Atlantic Wing: 10 October 1943 – 1 August 1944 Wideawake Field, Ascencion Island
- Station 7, South Atlantic Wing: 10 October 1943 – 1 August 1944 Amapa Airport, Brazil
- Station 8, South Atlantic Wing: 10 October 1943 – 1 August 1944 Fernando de Noronha Airport, Brazil
- Station 9, South Atlantic Wing: 10 October 1943 – 1 August 1944 Bahia Airfield, Brazil
- Station 10, South Atlantic Wing: 10 October 1943 – 1 August 1944 Ibura Airport, Brazil

==== Army Air Forces Base Units ====
- 1150 AAF Base Unit (Hq, South Atlantic Division, ATC) later (Hq, South Atlantic Wing, ATC), 1 August 1944 – 30 June 1946 Parnamirim Field, Brazil
- 1151 AAF Base Unit (South Atlantic Division Reserve) 1 August 1944 – 21 Sep 1945 Parnamirim Field, Brazil
- 1152 AAF Base Unit (Foreign Transport Station) 1 August 1944 – 2 January 1946 Fernando de Noronha Airport, Brazil
- 1153 AAF Base Unit (Foreign Transport Station) 1 August 1944 – 30 June 1946 Val de Cans Airport, Brazil
- 1154 AAF Base Unit (Foreign Transport Station) 1 August 1944 – 17 October 1945 Tirirical Airport, Brazil
- 1155 AAF Base Unit (Foreign Transport Station) 1 August 1944 – 17 October 1945 Adjiacento Airfield, Brazil
- 1156 AAF Base Unit (Foreign Transport Station) 1 August 1944 – 18 Dec 1944 Ibura Airport, Brazil
- 1159 AAF Base Unit (Foreign Transport Station) 1 August 1944 – 30 June 1946 Wideawake Field, Ascension Island
- 1160 AAF Base Unit (Foreign Transport Station) 25 October 44 – 17 October 1945 Amapa Airport, Brazil

=== Stations ===
- Georgetown, British Guiana (Guyana), 26 June 1942
- Parnamirim Field, Brazil, c. November 1942 – 30 June 1946

=== Campaign ===
Campaign Streamer	Campaign	Dates	Notes
	American Theater without inscription	26 June 1942 – 2 March 1946	24th AAF Ferrying Wing (later South Atlantic Wing, ATC)

== See also ==
- List of Douglas C-47 Skytrain operators
