= Zwölfaxing =

- Municipality
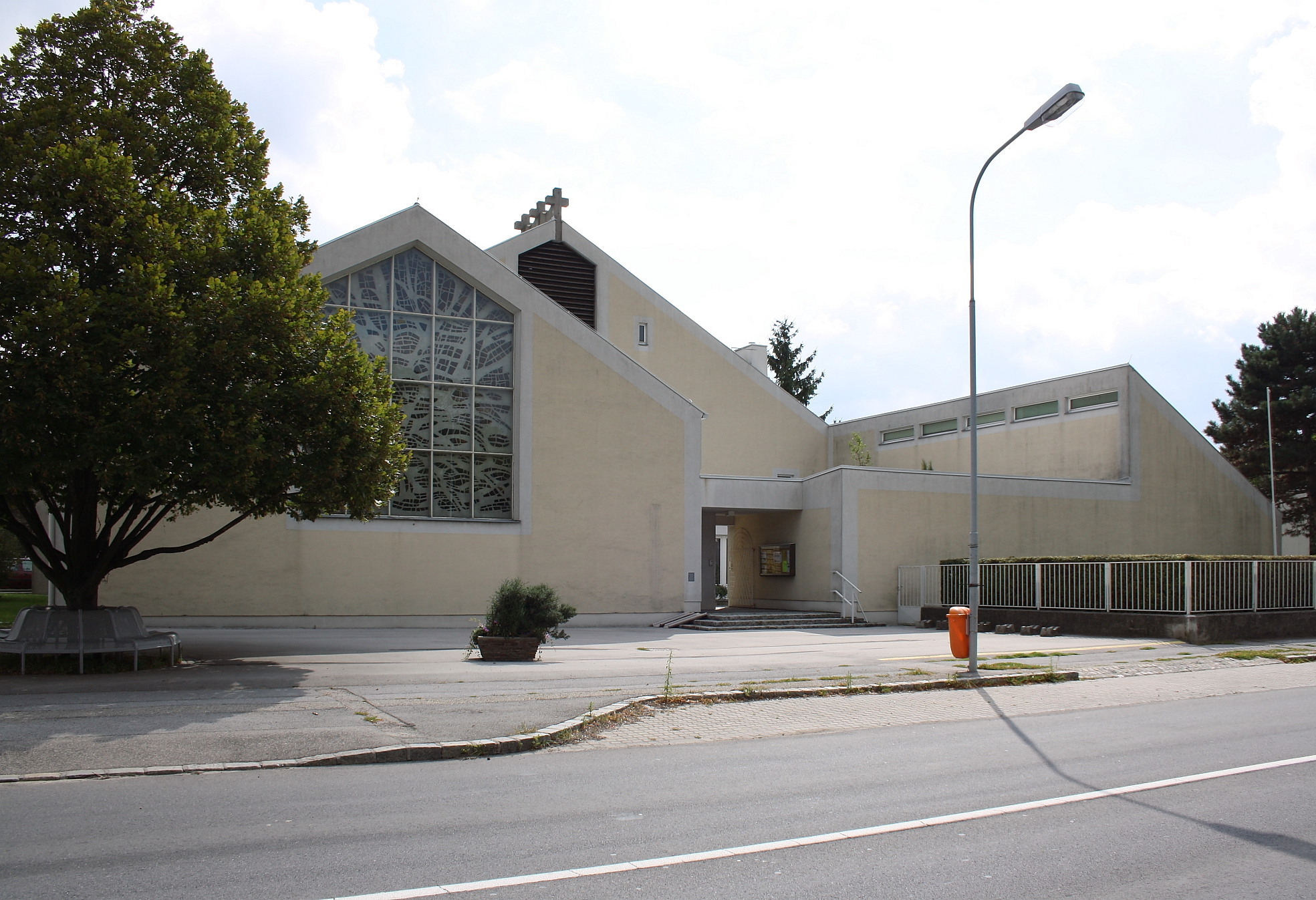
- Zwölfaxing parish church

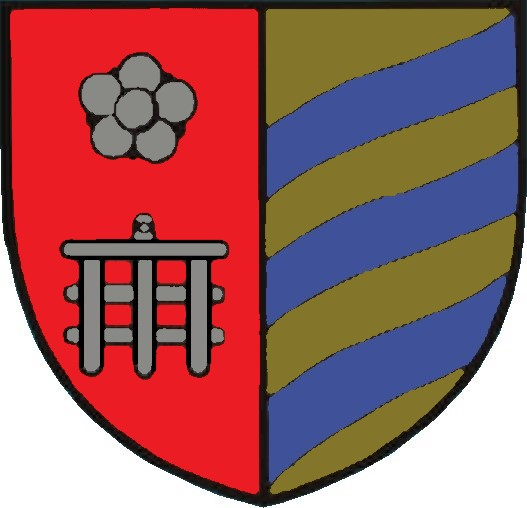
- Coat of arms

- Location within Austria
- Coordinates: 48°06′00″N 16°28′00″E
- Country: Austria
- State: Lower Austria
- District: Bruck an der Leitha

Government
  - Mayor: Astrid Reiser (SPÖ)

Area
  - Total: 6.75 km^{2} (2.61 sq mi)
- Elevation: 168 m (551 ft)

Population (2018-01-01)
  - Total: 1,744
  - Density: 258/km^{2} (669/sq mi)
- Time zone: UTC+1 (CET)
  - Summer (DST): UTC+2 (CEST)
- Postal code: 2322
- Area code: 01/70
- Vehicle registration: BL
- Website: www.zwoelfaxing.gv.at

Zwölfaxing is a municipality in the district of Bruck an der Leitha in the Austrian state of Lower Austria.

== Population ==
Historical population
Year	Pop.	±%
1971	1,188	—
1981	1,182	−0.5%
1991	1,371	+16.0%
2001	1,458	+6.3%
2005	1,454	−0.3%
