= Northwest African Troop Carrier Command =

The Northwest African Troop Carrier Command (NATCC) was a combined British-U.S. air command of the Second World War.

It was a sub-command of the Northwest African Air Forces which was a sub-command of the Mediterranean Air Command (MAC). These new Allied air force organizations were created at the Casablanca Conference in January 1943 to promote cooperation between the British Royal Air Force (RAF), the American United States Army Air Forces, and their respective ground and naval forces in the North African and Mediterranean Theater of Operations (MTO) during the Second World War. Effective February 18, 1943, the NATCC and other MAC commands existed until December 10, 1943 when MAC was disbanded and the Mediterranean Allied Air Forces (MAAF) were established. Brigadier General Paul Williams was the commander of NATCC.

The components of NATCC at the time of the Allied invasion of Sicily (codenamed "Operation Husky") on July 10, 1943 are illustrated below.

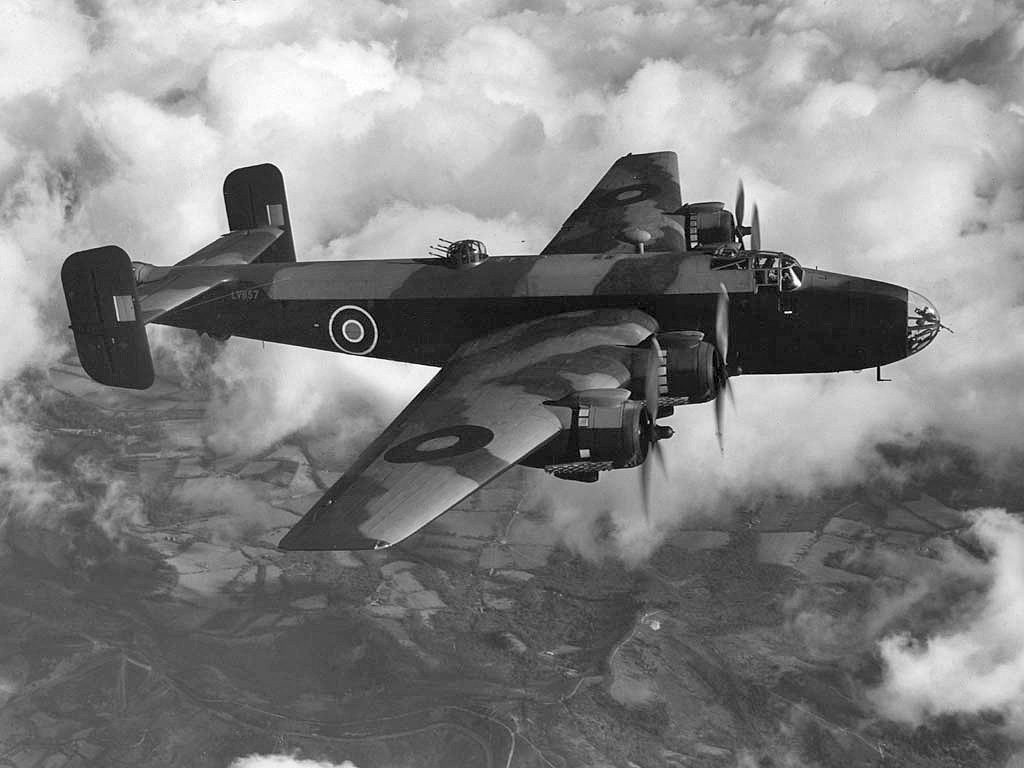
Halifax bombers similar to this were used to tow Horsa gliders during Operation Husky.

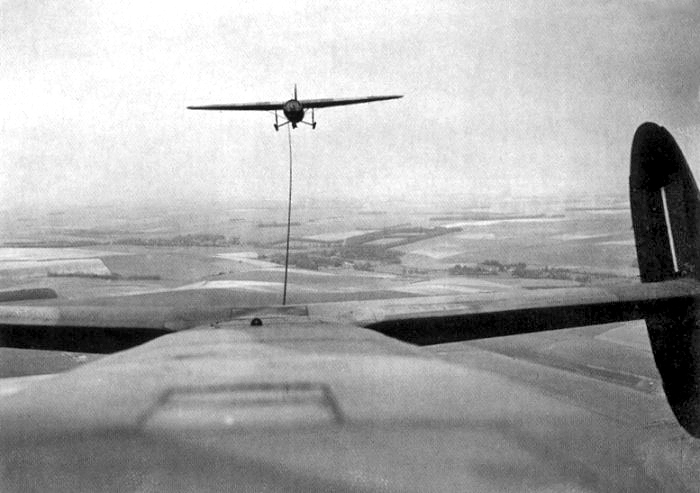
Albemarle towing a Horsa glider.

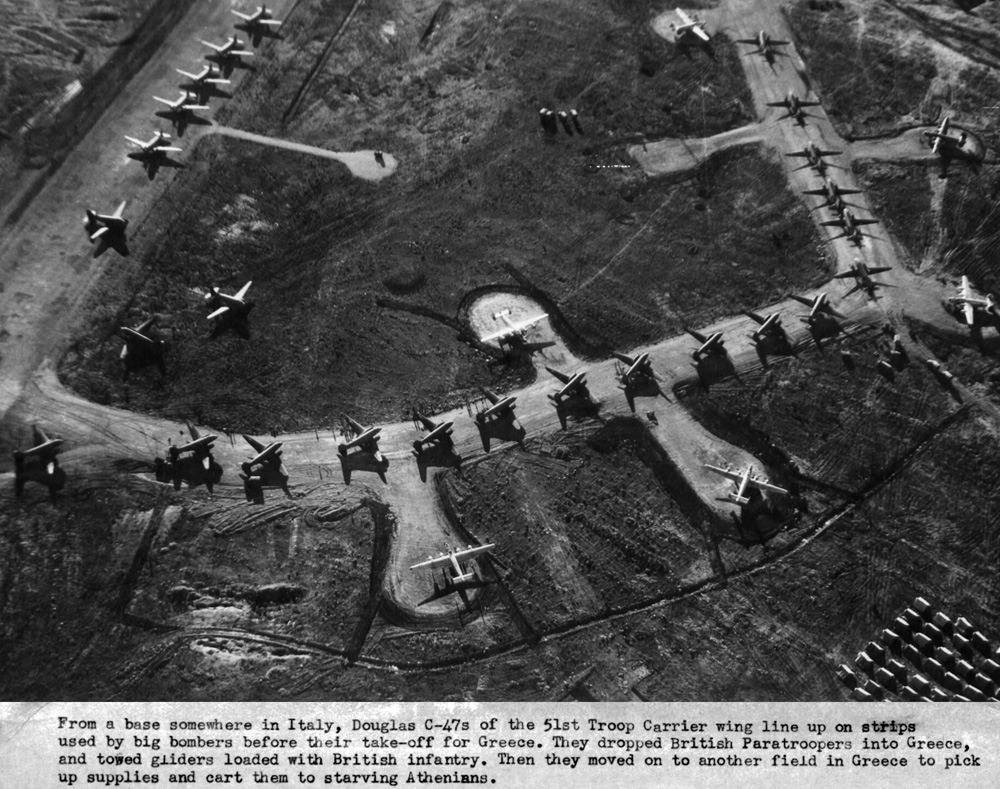
51st Troop Carrier Wing in Italy.

Northwest African Troop Carrier Command
Brigadier General Paul L. Williams

51st Troop Carrier Wing Brig. Gen. Ray Dunn	52nd Troop Carrier Wing Brig. Gen. Harold Clark	RAF Detachment
60th Troop Carrier Group; Lt. Col. Frederick Sherwood 10th Squadron, C-47; 11th Squadron, C-47; 12th Squadron, C-47; 28th Squadron, C-47	61st Troop Carrier Group; Colonel Willis Mitchell 14th Squadron, C-47; 15th Squadron, C-47; 53rd Squadron, C-47; 59th Squadron, C-47	No. 38 Wing; Air Commodore William Primrose No. 295 Squadron (Det.), Halifax; No. 296 Squadron, Albemarle - -
62nd Troop Carrier Group; Lt. Col. Aubrey Hurren 4th Squadron, C-47; 7th Squadron, C-47; 8th Squadron, C-47; 51st Squadron, C-47	313th Troop Carrier Group; Colonel James Roberts Jr. 29th Squadron, C-47; 47th Squadron, C-47; 48th Squadron, C-47; 49th Squadron, C-47	
64th Troop Carrier Group; Colonel John Cerny 16th Squadron, C-47; 17th Squadron, C-47; 18th Squadron, C-47; 35th Squadron, C-47	314th Troop Carrier Group; Colonel Clayton Stiles 32nd Squadron, C-47; 50th Squadron, C-47; 61st Squadron, C-47; 62nd Squadron, C-47	
316th Troop Carrier Group; Colonel Jerome McCauley 36th Squadron, C-47; 44th Squadron, C-47; 45th Squadron, C-47

Note:
In mid-1943, to facilitate transport and supply operations for Operation Husky, the USAAF 315th Troop Carrier Group (34th & 43rd Squadrons) was sent from England to Tunisia and assigned to the Mediterranean Air Transport Service which along with NATCC, was a sub-command of the Mediterranean Air Command.

A tragedy occurred over the Farello Airstrip, when American anti-aircraft gunners mistook American troop carrier transports for enemy planes. On the night of July 11, 1943, 23 of 144 aircraft failed to return to Tunisia. Another 37 planes were badly damaged. The aircraft loss ratio was very high, at 16%. Brigadier General Charles Keerans, Jr., the Assistant Division Commander (ADC) of the U.S. 82nd Airborne Division, was aboard one of the planes that did not return. The 504th Parachute Regimental Combat Team (including the 1st and 2nd Battalions of the 504th PIR, along with the 376th Parachute Field Artillery Battalion, Company 'C' of the 307th Airborne Engineer Battalion and numerous medical and signal units attached, for a total of some 2,300 men), under Colonel Reuben Tucker, suffered a total of 229 casualties on the night of 11 July 1943: 81 dead, 132 wounded, and 16 missing.
