= 313th Expeditionary Operations Group =

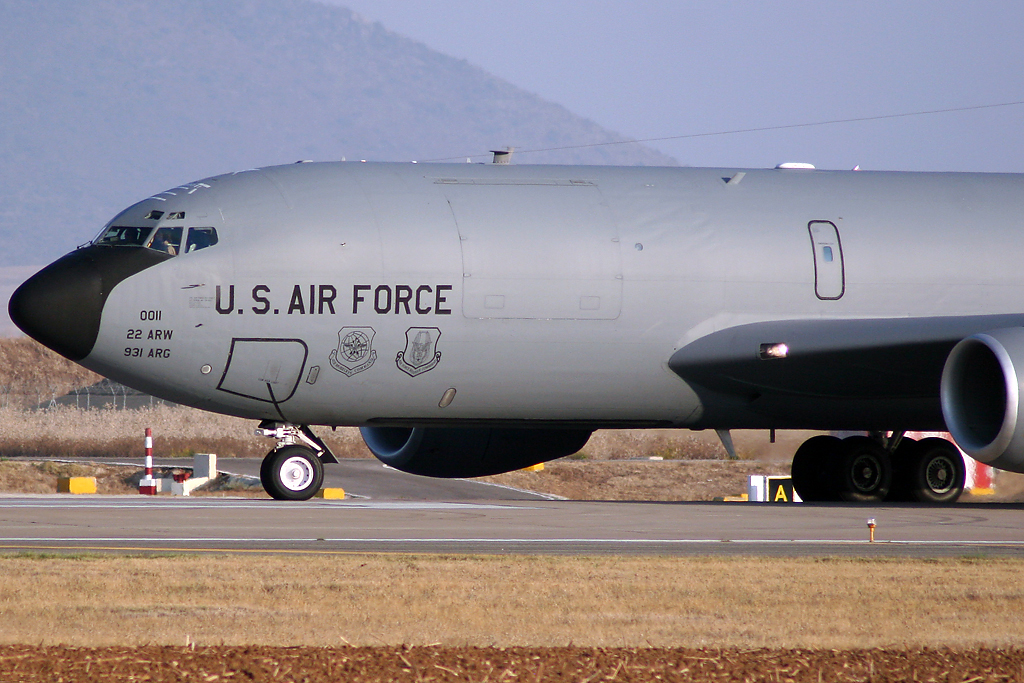
- KC-135 Stratotanker deployed to Moron AB in 2011
- Active: 1942–1945; 1946–1948; 1948–1949; 1952–1955; 1978–1993
- Country: United States
- Branch: United States Air Force
- Role: Airlift
- Part of: United States Air Forces in Europe
- Engagements: Mediterranean Theater of Operations; European Theater of Operations
- Decorations: Distinguished Unit Citation; Air Force Outstanding Unit Award

Insignia
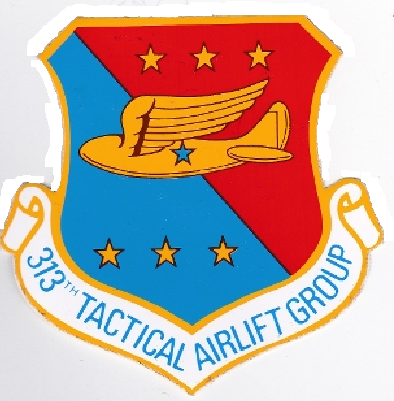
- 313th Expeditionary Operations Group emblem (approved 3 February 1943)

The 313th Expeditionary Operations Group is a Provisional United States Air Force unit, assigned to United States Air Forces in Europe to activate or inactivate as needed. It was last active at Moron Air Base, Spain, supporting Operations Odyssey Dawn and Unified Protector to enforce a no-fly zone over Libya. It was inactivated on 31 October 2011.

During World War II, the group was assigned to both Twelfth and Ninth Air Forces in North Africa, Italy and Western Europe. The 313 TCG was highly decorated for its combat parachute infantry drops during the Invasion of Sicily (Operation Husky); Invasion of Italy (Operation Avalanche); Invasion of France (Operation Overlord); the airborne invasion of the Netherlands (Operation Market-Garden); and the airborne crossing of the Rhine River (Operation Varsity).

== History ==
For related history and lineage, see 313th Tactical Airlift Wing

=== World War II ===
The group was activated at Daniel Field, Georgia in March 1942 as the 313th Transport Group, with only a headquarters and a single squadron, the 29th Transport Squadron, assigned. In June, the group added three additional squadrons (the 47th, 48th and 49th Transport Squadrons) and moved to Bowman Field, Kentucky to begin training. The group trained under Air Transport Command with Douglas C-47 Skytrain and the C-53 Skytrooper modification of the C-47. In July, the Army Air Forces gave the "transport" designation to its strategic airlift units, and the group became the 313th Troop Carrier Group under I Troop Carrier Command. The 313th trained in the southeastern United States until April 1943, when it deployed to North Africa.

==== Mediterranean operations ====
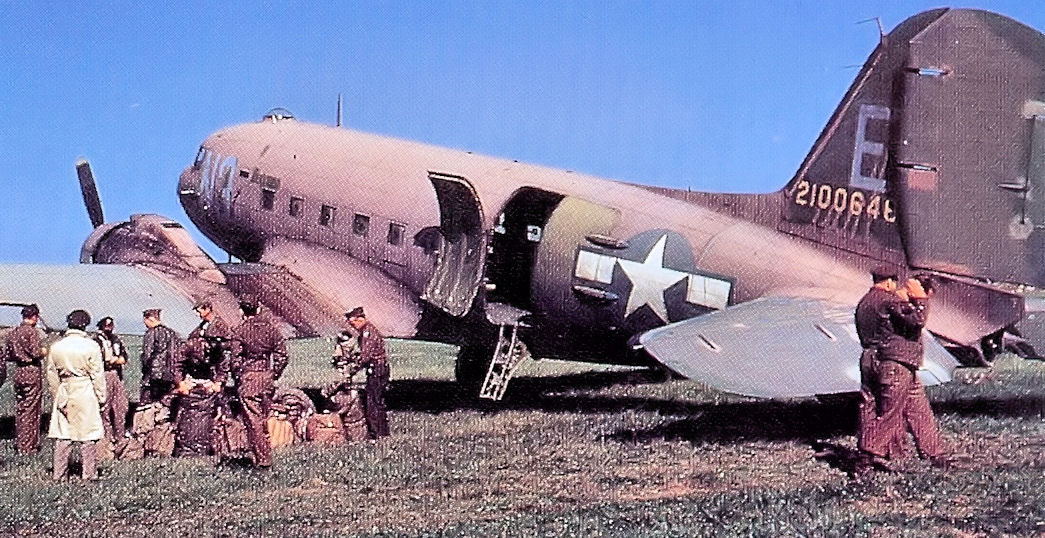
47th Troop Carrier Squadron C-47 (Note: Aircraft is Douglas C-47A-70-DL Skytrain serial 42-100646, at AAF Station Nordholz, Germany in July 1945.)

The group began flying combat missions from Oujda Airfield in French Morocco. It performed troop carrier and transport airlift of supplies to ground forces advancing through Algeria into Tunisia as part Twelfth Air Force. it also evacuated wounded from the battle area.

The 313th took part in Operation Husky, the invasion of Sicily. Although blown far off course on the first airdrops on the island by strong winds, the group managed to drop its paratroops near Avola, where they were able to assist British forces in seizing that town. Two days later, 11 July 1943, the 313th Group led the stream of troop carrier units of the 52d Troop Carrier Wing bringing reinforcements, planning to drop paratroops near Gela. However, attacks in the Gela area by enemy aircraft had sunk two ships and forced other ships in the invasion force to disperse. The heaviest enemy attack came at 2150 hours. Fifty minutes later, the first 313th Group aircraft approached the drop zone. The group was able to successfully make its drop on Farello Airfield. Mistaking the troop carriers for another enemy attack, ships of the assault force and antiaircraft units ashore began a heavy fire on the group's C-47s as they departed. Of the 144 planes of the 52d Wing that participated in the mission, 23 were shot down and an additional 37 were heavily damaged. For its completion of this mission the group earned its first Distinguished Unit Citation (DUC).

It moved to Sicily for Operation Avalanche, the invasion of Italy. It dropped paratroopers of 82d Airborne Division south of Salerno on the night of 13 September 1943 and flew a reinforcement mission the following night.

==== European operations ====
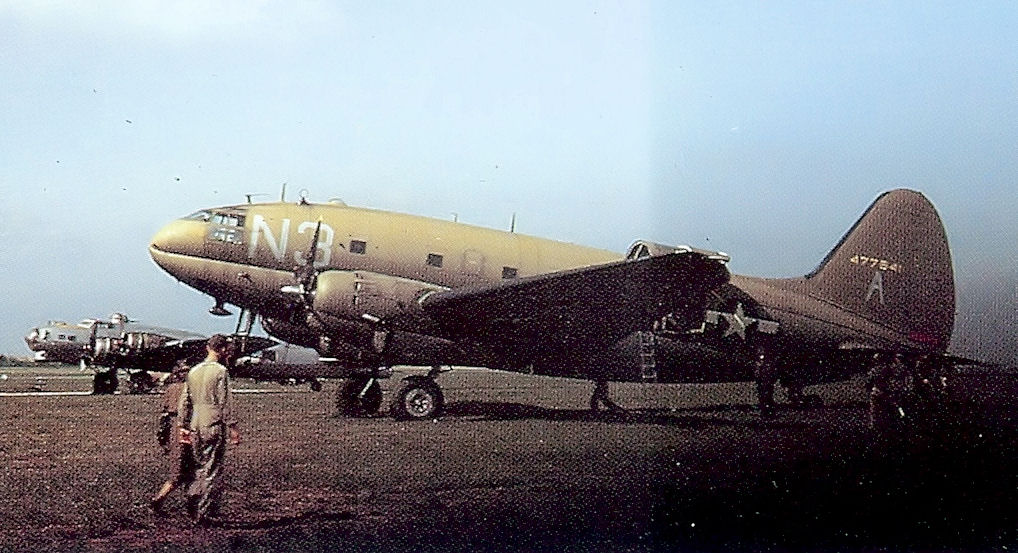
313th Troop Carrier Group C-46 Commando (Note: Aircraft is Curtiss C-46D-10-CU Commando serial 44-77541 at Achiet Airfield in April 1945. Shortly after this picture was taken the plane was damaged and written off.)

In February 1944, the group moved to RAF Folkingham, England, where it became part of IX Troop Carrier Command and began training for the assault on the continent of Europe. On D-Day the group dropped paratroopers near Picauville, Normandy and dropped reinforcements the following day. The group's efforts during Operation Overlord earned it a second DUC.

On 17 September, the 313th participated in Operation Market Garden, the airborne assault on the Netherlands, when it dropped troopers near Arnhem and Nijmegen. In February 1945, the unit moved to Achiet Airfield in France, where it began converting to Curtiss C-46 Commandos in preparation for Operation Varsity, the airborne assault across the Rhine. On 24 March 1945 it dropped elements of the 17th Airborne Division near Wesel.

The group continued to operate from Achiet during 1945, performing transportation of personnel and supplies within Europe. It evacuated wounded and former prisoners of war and brought gasoline, ammunition to forward areas. After V-E Day, it continued to transport medical equipment and other supplies. In September, the squadron's personnel returned to the United States and it was inactivated on arrival at the port of embarkation.

=== Berlin Airlift ===
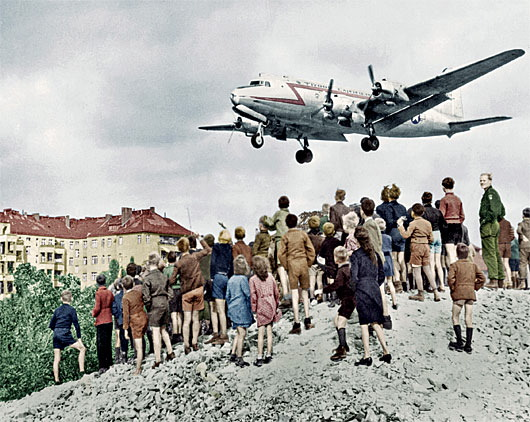
C-54 landing at Tempelhof Central Airport in 1948.

The group was reactivated at Tulln Air Base, Austria, although one of its squadrons was stationed at Capodichino Airport, near Naples, Italy and another at Tempelhof Central Airport in Berlin, Germany. The unit formed part of the occupation forces and served as part of the European Air Transport Service, returning to operating the C-47. In May, all squadrons gathered at Tulln and in June 1947, the group was moved (less its personnel and equipment) back to the United States. In July, it moved to Bergstrom Field, Texas, where it was crewed and began to train with Fairchild C-82 Packet aircraft and gliders. Shortly after its arrival at Bergstrom, the group and its supporting units were reorganized under the wing base organization, with both operational and support elements reporting to the 313th Troop Carrier Wing.

In July 1948, group deployed its 48th Squadron to Rhein-Main Air Base to reinforce United States Air Forces in Europe in the Berlin Airlift. As winter approached and the demand for supplies increased, the group and its squadrons moved to RAF Fassberg, Germany, and began to operate Douglas C-54 Skymasters, with which it flew food, medicine and coal into Berlin. In January 1949, the 313th Wing was inactivated and the group was assigned directly to the 1st Airlift Task Force, but attached to the 60th Troop Carrier Wing at Rhein Main. Berlin Airlift operations continued until September 1949, with the Soviet blockade of Berlin ended, and, faced with President Truman's smaller 1949 defense budget, the Air Force was required to reduce the number of its groups to 48. The group was inactivated in September 1949.

=== Tactical Air Command ===
The group was activated at Mitchel Air Force Base, New York on 1 February 1953, when it replaced the 514th Troop Carrier Group, a reserve unit that had been mobilized for the Korean War. The 514th was in the process of converting from C-46 Commandos to Fairchild C-119 Flying Boxcars, and the 313th took over its personnel and equipment. Meanwhile, Tactical Air Command (TAC) was preparing the 465th Troop Carrier Group at Donaldson Air Force Base, South Carolina for deployment to France, but no wing headquarters was at Donaldson for the 465th Group and its support units. In August, TAC inactivated the 313th Troop Carrier Wing at Mitchel and replaced it and its support units with the 465th Troop Carrier Wing. The 313th Group was reassigned directly to Eighteenth Air Force, but was attached to the new wing for the remainder of the group's stay at Mitchel.

In October 1953, the group moved to Sewart Air Force Base, Tennessee. While it remained assigned to Eighteenth Air Force, but was attached to the 314th Troop Carrier Wing.) The group trained with C-119s at Sewart until inactivated in June 1955.

=== European theater airlift ===
The group was redesignated the 313th Tactical Airlift Group and activated in September 1978 at RAF Mildenhall, England when it replaced the 435th Tactical Airlift Group controlling Military Airlift Command (MAC) Lockheed C-130 Hercules crews and aircraft rotating from the United States to provide theater airlift support in Europe. It was assigned a maintenance squadron and an aerial port squadron to support the Hercules, who were organized into a provisional "Bravo" Squadron. (Note: Lettered squadron names for airlift assets rotating to Europe began with Alpha and Bravo Squadrons at Evreux-Fauville Air Base France in 1961. Bravo Squadron moved to RAF Mildenhall when President de Gaulle expelled U.S. forces from France in 1963. Kusumoto.) Until 1983, it also was assigned the 627th Military Airlift Support Squadron, that provided enroute support to Lockheed C-5 Galaxy and Lockheed C-141 Starlifter flights to and from the United States and other worldwide destinations. In 1983, the 627th was inactivated and its mission was assumed by the other elements of the group.

During the Gulf War, Bravo Squadron was expanded by additional forces from the Air Force Reserve and the Air National Guard, when 30 aircraft and 44 crews were attached to the 313th Group. In January 1993, the group was inactivated after earning four Air Force Outstanding Unit Awards. The enroute support mission was transferred to the reactivated 627th Airlift Support Squadron, which also managed Bravo Squadron until the rotation of C-130s to Mildenhall ended on 1 April.

=== Expeditionary operations ===
The group was converted to provisional status as the 313th Expeditionary Operations Group. It was activated on 19 March 2011 at Moron Air Base, Spain to support Operation Odyssey Dawn, a mission to enforce a no-fly zone put in place to protect the civilian population of Libya. At the end of March Odyssey Dawn became a NATO operation as Operation Unified Protector. The group flew more than 2200 sorties and offloaded over 110,000,000 pounds of fuel to aircraft flying Unified Protector missions before inactivating on 31 October.

== Lineage ==
- Constituted as the 313th Transport Group on 28 January 1942

Activated on 2 March 1942.
Redesignated 313th Troop Carrier Group on 4 July 1942
Inactivated on 15 November 1945

- Activated on 30 September 1946

Redesignated 313th Troop Carrier Group, Heavy on 30 July 1948
Redesignated 313th Troop Carrier Group, Special on 1 February 1949
Inactivated on 18 September 1949

- Redesignated 313th Troop Carrier Group, Medium on 25 November 1952

Activated on 1 February 1953
Inactivated on 8 June 1955

- Redesignated 313th Tactical Airlift Group on 24 August 1978

Activated on 15 September 1978
Inactivated on 16 January 1993

- Converted to provisional status and redesignated 313th Expeditionary Operations Group on 12 June 2002

Activated on 19 March 2011
Inactivated on 31 October 2011

=== Assignments ===
- I Troop Carrier Command, 2 March 1942
- 52d Transport Wing (later 52d Troop Carrier Wing), 15 June 1942
- 53d Troop Carrier Wing, September 1942
- 52d Troop Carrier Wing, November 1942 (attached to XII Troop Carrier Command (Provisional) April 1943 – 4 February 1944)
- I Troop Carrier Command, 14 September – 15 November 1945
- 51st Troop Carrier Wing, 30 September 1946
- Ninth Air Force, 25 June 1947
- 313th Troop Carrier Wing, 28 July 1947
- 1 Airlift Task Force 20 January 1949 – 18 September 1949 (attached to 60th Troop Carrier Wing)
- 313th Troop Carrier Wing, 1 February 1953
- Eighteenth Air Force, 25 August 1953 – 8 June 1955 (attached to 465th Troop Carrier Wing to 30 September 1953, 314th Troop Carrier Wing
- 322d Airlift Division, 15 September 1978
- Twenty-First Air Force, 1 April 1992 – 16 January 1993
- Air Mobility Command to activate or inactivate as needed, 12 June 2002

313th Air Expeditionary Wing, 19 March–31 October 2011

=== Stations ===
- Daniel Field, Georgia, 2 March 1942
- Bowman Field, Kentucky, 21 June 1942
- Florence Army Air Field, South Carolina, 4 August 1942
- Laurinburg-Maxton Army Air Base, North Carolina, 13 December 1942 – 24 April 1943
- Oujda Airfield, French Morocco, 9 May 1943
- Kairouan Airfield, Tunisia, 16 June 1943
- Sciacca Airfield, Sicily, Italy, 23 August 1943
- Trapani/Milo Airfield, Sicily, Italy, 3 October 1943
- RAF Folkingham (AAF-484), England, 4 February 1944
- Achiet Airfield (B-54), France, 28 February – 5 August 1945
- Baer Field, Indiana, 14 September – 15 November 1945
- Tulln Air Base, Austria, 30 September 1946 – 25 June 1947
- Langley Field, Virginia, 25 June 1947
- Bergstrom Field (later Bergstrom Air Force Base), Texas, 15 July 1947 – 22 October 1948
- RAF Fassberg, Germany, 9 November 1948 – 18 September 1949
- Mitchel Air Force Base, New York, 1 February 1953
- Sewart Air Force Base, Tennessee, 2 October 1953 – 8 June 1955
- RAF Mildenhall, England, 15 September 1978 – 16 January 1993
- Moron Air Base, Spain, 19 March–31 October 2011

=== Components ===
- 29th Transport Squadron (later 29th Troop Carrier Squadron), 2 March 1942 – 22 September 1945; 30 September 1946 – 18 September 1949; 1 February 1953 – 8 June 1955
- 47th Transport Squadron (later 47th Troop Carrier Squadron), 15 June 1942 – 22 September 1945; 30 September 1946 – 18 September 1949; 1 February 1953 – 8 June 1955
- 48th Transport Squadron (later 48th Troop Carrier Squadron), 15 June 1942 – 22 September 1945; 30 September 1946 – 18 September 1949; 1 February 1953 – 8 June 1955
- 49th Transport Squadron (later 49th Troop Carrier Squadron), 15 June 1942 – 22 September 1945
- 313th Aerial Port Squadron, 15 September 1978 – 16 January 1993
- 313th Consolidated Aircraft Maintenance Squadron, 15 September 1978 – 16 January 1993
- 627th Military Airlift Support Squadron, 15 September 1978 – 1 August 1983

=== Aircraft ===
- Douglas C-47 Skytrain, 1942–1945, 1946–1947
- Douglas C-53 Skytrooper, 1942–1945
- Curtiss C-46 Commando, 1945, 1953
- Douglas C-54 Skymaster, 1946–1947, 1848–1949
- Waco CG-4 (Glider) 1947–1949
- Fairchild C-82 Packet, 1947–1949
- Fairchild C-119 Flying Boxcar, 1953–1955
- Lockheed C-130 Hercules (attached), 1978–1993
- Boeing KC-135 Stratotanker, 2011
- McDonnell Douglas KC-10 Extender, 2011
