= 29th Weapons Squadron =

29th Weapons Squadron

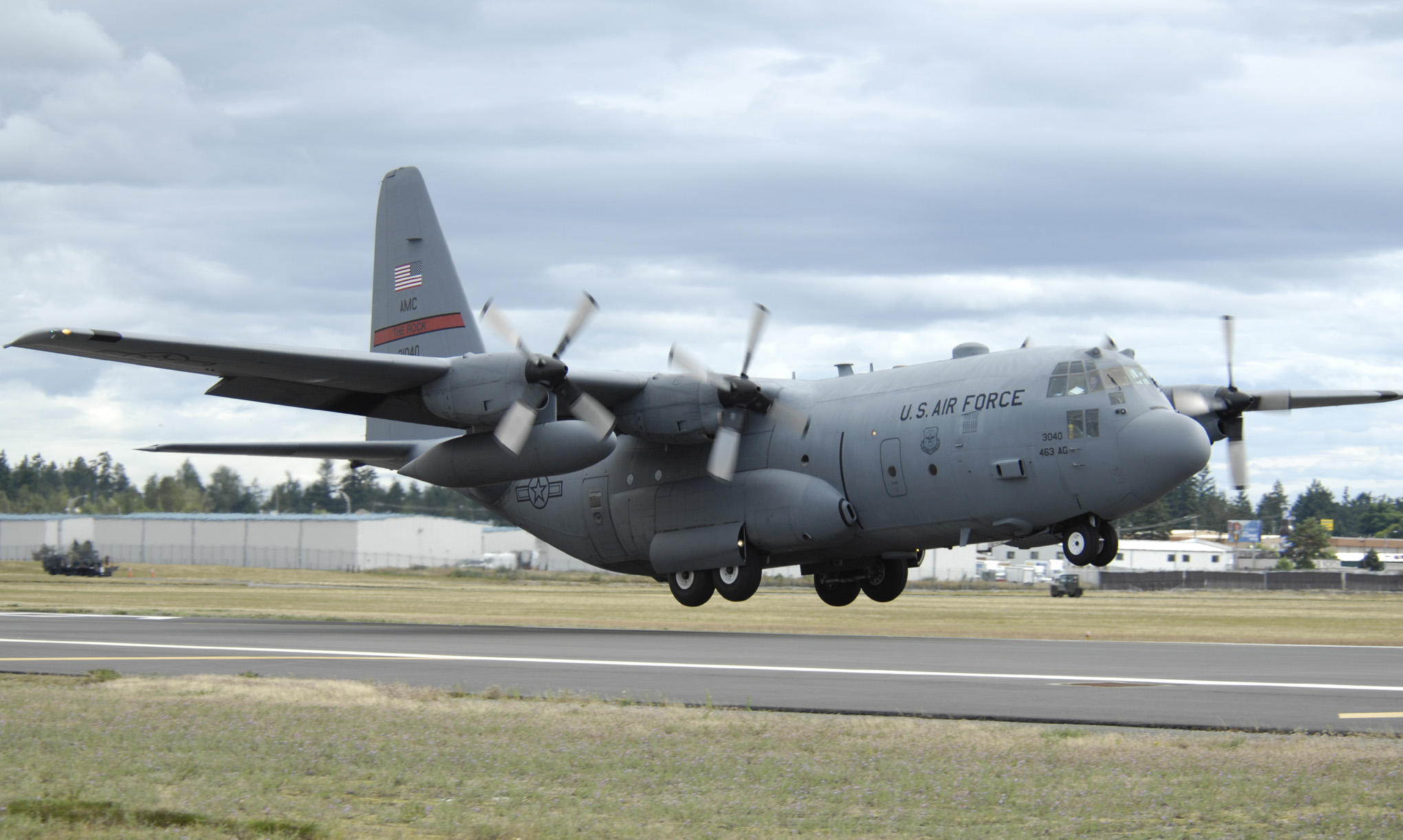
- A C-130 Hercules from Little Rock, Air Force Base, Arkansas
- Active: 1942–1945; 1946–1949; 1953–1955; 1964–1971; 2003–present
- Country: United States
- Branch: United States Air Force
- Role: Airlift operational testing
- Part of: USAF Weapons School
- Garrison/HQ: Little Rock Air Force Base, Arkansas
- Nickname(s): F Troop (Vietnam era)
- Engagements: European Theater; Vietnam War
- Decorations: Distinguished Unit Citation; Air Force Outstanding Unit Award with Combat "V" Device; Air Force Outstanding Unit Award; Vietnamese Gallantry Cross with Palm

Insignia
- 29th Weapons Squadron emblem (Approved 28 October 2003)

- 29th Tactical Airlift Squadron emblem (Approved 24 August 1943) (Note: The 29th Tactical Airlift Squadron resumed use of the original emblem of the 29th Troop Carrier Squadron.)

- Emblem used by the 29th Troop Carrier Squadron in the 1950s.
- Fuselage code while in European Theater: 5X

The 29th Weapons Squadron is a United States Air Force unit, stationed at Little Rock Air Force Base, Arkansas. It is assigned to the USAF Weapons School at Nellis Air Force Base. The mission of the squadron is to provide advanced Lockheed C-130J Hercules instructional flying.

The squadron was first activated in 1942 as the 29th Transport Squadron. After training in the United States, it deployed to the Mediterranean Theater of Operations as the 29th Troop Carrier Squadron. The squadron dropped paratroopers in the invasions of Sicily and Italy before moving to England. From England it participated in Operation Overlord. The 29th earned two Distinguished Unit Citations for combat actions. Following VE Day, the squadron returned to the United States where it was inactivated in September 1945.

The squadron was activated again in September 1946 and served with the occupation forces in Italy and Austria before returning to the United States in 1947. In 1948 the squadron moved to Germany, where it participated in the Berlin Airlift until being inactivated in 1949 as American airlift forces in Germany were reduced after the blockade of Berlin was ended. The squadron was activated again at Mitchel Air Force Base in February 1953, when it assumed the resources of the 335th Troop Carrier Squadron, a reserve unit that had been activated for the Korean War, and which was returning to reserve status. The squadron was inactivated in June 1955.

The squadron was again activated in October 1964 at Forbes Air Force Base, Kansas. In December 1965, the squadron moved to Clark Air Base, Philippines, from which it deployed its Lockheed C-130 Hercules transports to support the Vietnam War. In 1971, it moved on paper to Langley Air Force Base, Virginia, where it again worked up on the C-130. Shortly after it became combat ready, however, it was inactivated and its personnel and aircraft were transferred to the 38th Tactical Airlift Squadron, which was simultaneously activated.

== Mission ==
The 29th Weapons Squadron conducts graduate-level instruction in weapons and tactics employment with the Lockheed C-130J Hercules. A detachment of the squadron at Rosecrans Field performs the same mission for Air National Guard and Air Force Reserve C-130H crews.

== History ==
=== World War II ===
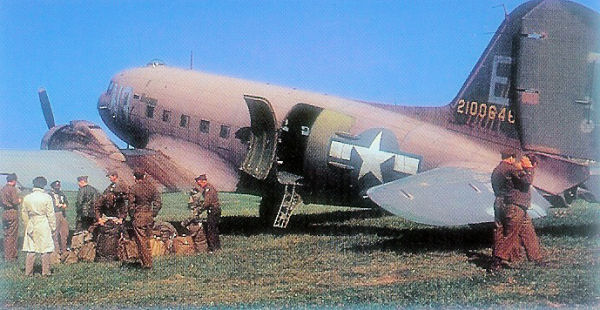
313th Troop Carrier Group C-47

The squadron was activated as the 29th Transport Squadron in March 1942 as the original squadron of the 313th Transport Group. The group was expanded from a headquarters and a single squadron in June, when the 47th, 48th, and 49th Transport Squadrons were activated to fill out the 313th. The 29th trained under Air Transport Command (later I Troop Carrier Command) and equipped with Douglas C-47 Skytrain aircraft and other military models of the Douglas DC-3, including the C-53 Skytrooper in the southeastern United States.

==== Mediterranean operations ====
The squadron, now named the 29th Troop Carrier Squadron, moved to Oujda Airfield, French Morocco after the Operation Torch landings. It performed airlift of supplies and personnel to ground forces advancing through Algeria into Tunisia as part of Twelfth Air Force. The unit also evacuated wounded personnel to rear areas.

The 29th, along with the 47th and 48th Squadrons of the 313th Group, took part in Operation Husky, the invasion of Sicily. Although blown far off course on the first airdrops on the island by strong winds, the squadron managed to drop their paratroops near Avola, where they were able to assist British forces in seizing that town. Two days later, 11 July 1943, the squadron was part of a formation of troop carrier units of the 52d Troop Carrier Wing bringing reinforcements, planning to drop paratroops near Gela. Planes of the 313th Group led the stream of troop carriers. However, attacks in the Gela area by enemy aircraft had sunk two ships and forced other ships in the invasion force to disperse. The heaviest enemy attack came at 2150 hours. Fifty minutes later, the first 313th Group aircraft approached the drop zone. The 48th was able to successfully make its drop on Farello Airfield. Mistaking the troop carriers for another enemy attack, ships of the assault force and antiaircraft units ashore began a heavy fire on squadron's C-47s as they departed. Of the 144 planes of the 52d Wing that participated in the mission, 23 were shot down and an additional 37 were heavily damaged. For its completion of this mission the squadron earned its first Distinguished Unit Citation (DUC).

It moved to Sicily for Operation Avalanche, the invasion of Italy. It dropped paratroopers of 82d Airborne Division south of Salerno on the night of 13 September 1943 and flew a reinforcement mission the following night.

==== European operations ====
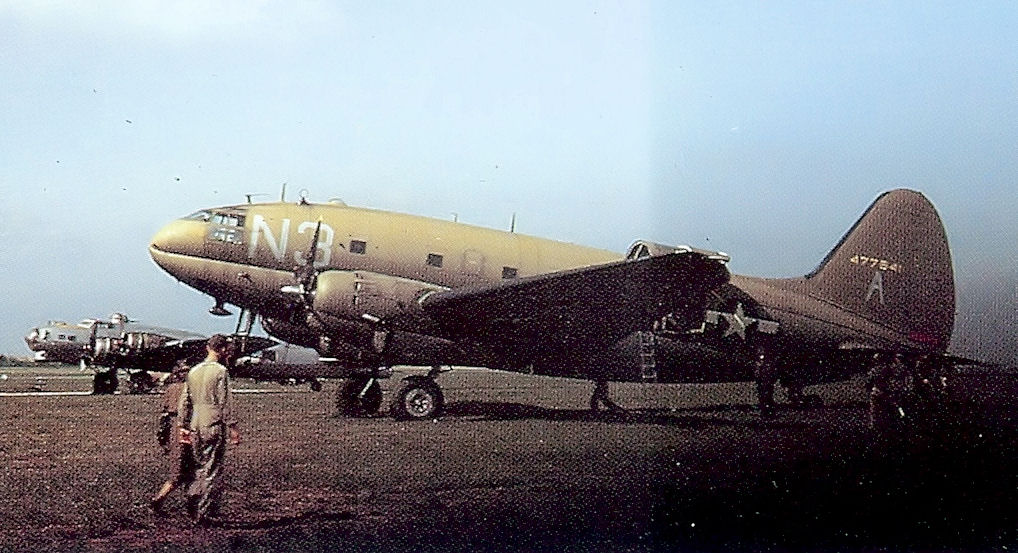
313th Troop Carrier Group C-46 Commando (Note: Aircraft is Curtiss C-46D-10-CU Commando serial 44-77541 at Achiet Airfield in April 1945. Shortly after this picture was taken the plane was damaged and written off.)

In February 1944, the squadron moved to RAF Folkingham, England, where it became part of IX Troop Carrier Command and began training for the assault on the continent of Europe. On D-Day the squadron dropped paratroopers near Picauville, Normandy and dropped reinforcements the following day. The squadron's efforts during Operation Overlord earned it a second DUC.

On 17 September, the squadron participated in Operation Market Garden, the airborne assault on the Netherlands, when it dropped troopers near Arnhem and Nijmegen. In February 1945, the squadron moved to Achiet Airfield in France, where it began converting to Curtiss C-46 Commandos in preparation for Operation Varsity, the airborne assault across the Rhine. On 24 March 1945 it dropped elements of the 17th Airborne Division near Wesel.

The squadron continued to operate from Achiet during 1945, performing transportation of personnel and supplies within Europe. It evacuated wounded and former prisoners of war and brought gasoline, ammunition to forward areas. After V-E Day, it continued to transport medical equipment and other supplies. In September, the squadron's personnel returned to the United States and it was inactivated on arrival at the port of embarkation.

In August 1945 the squadron returned to the United States, and was inactivated at the port of embarkation in September.

=== Army of Occupation and Berlin Airlift ===
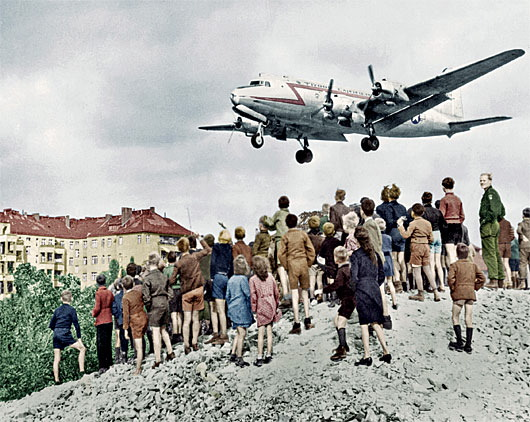
C-54 landing at Tempelhof Airport, Berlin

The squadron was activated at Capodichino Airport near Naples, Italy at the end of September 1946, absorbing the mission, personnel and equipment of the 305th Troop Carrier Squadron, which was simultaneously inactivated. It once again was equipped with C-47s. The squadron briefly moved to Tulln Air Base, Austria in the spring of 1947.

The squadron transferred without personnel and equipment to the States in June 1947. At Bergstrom Field, Texas it trained with Fairchild C-82 Packets and gliders. The squadron departed Bergstrom for in late October 1948 for Germany, arriving in early November to reinforce airlift units in Operation Vittles, the Berlin airlift as winter approached and the demand for supplies increased. Operating from a Royal Air Force base because of congestion at United States Air Forces Europe bases in Germany, the unit used Douglas C-54 Skymasters to transport cargo including coal, food, and medicine into West Berlin. As airlift forces in Europe were reduced following the lifting of the Soviet blockade, and faced with President Truman’s smaller 1949 defense budget, the Air Force was required to reduce the number of its groups to 48. The squadron was inactivated in September 1949.

=== Cold War ===
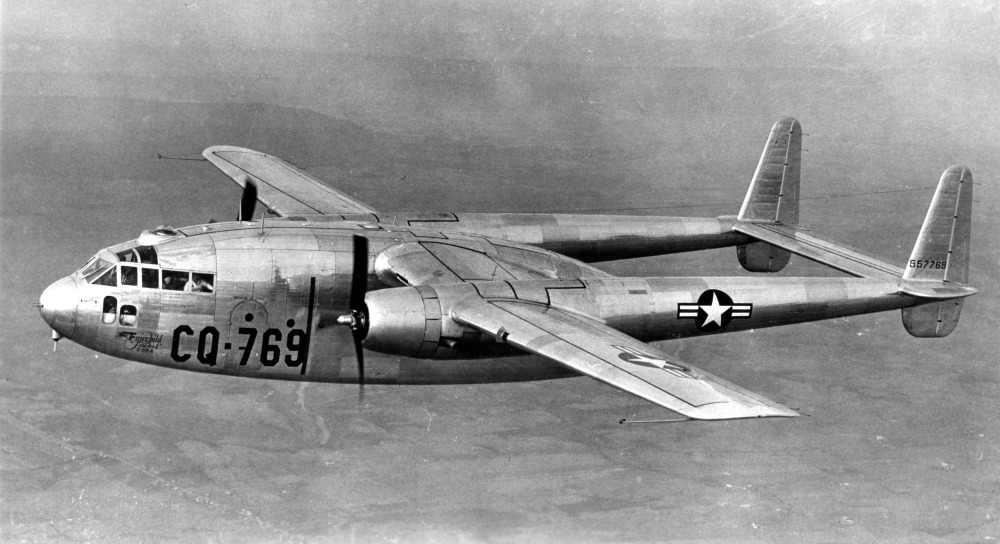
Fairchild C-119A

The squadron was activated at Mitchel Air Force Base, New York in February 1953, assuming the personnel and Fairchild C-119 Flying Boxcars of the 335th Troop Carrier Squadron, an Air Force Reserve unit that had been called to active duty for the Korean War and was transitioning to the C-119 from the Curtiss Commando. The squadron trained to maintain combat readiness in tactical airlift operations. It was inactivated on 8 June 1955.

=== Vietnam War ===
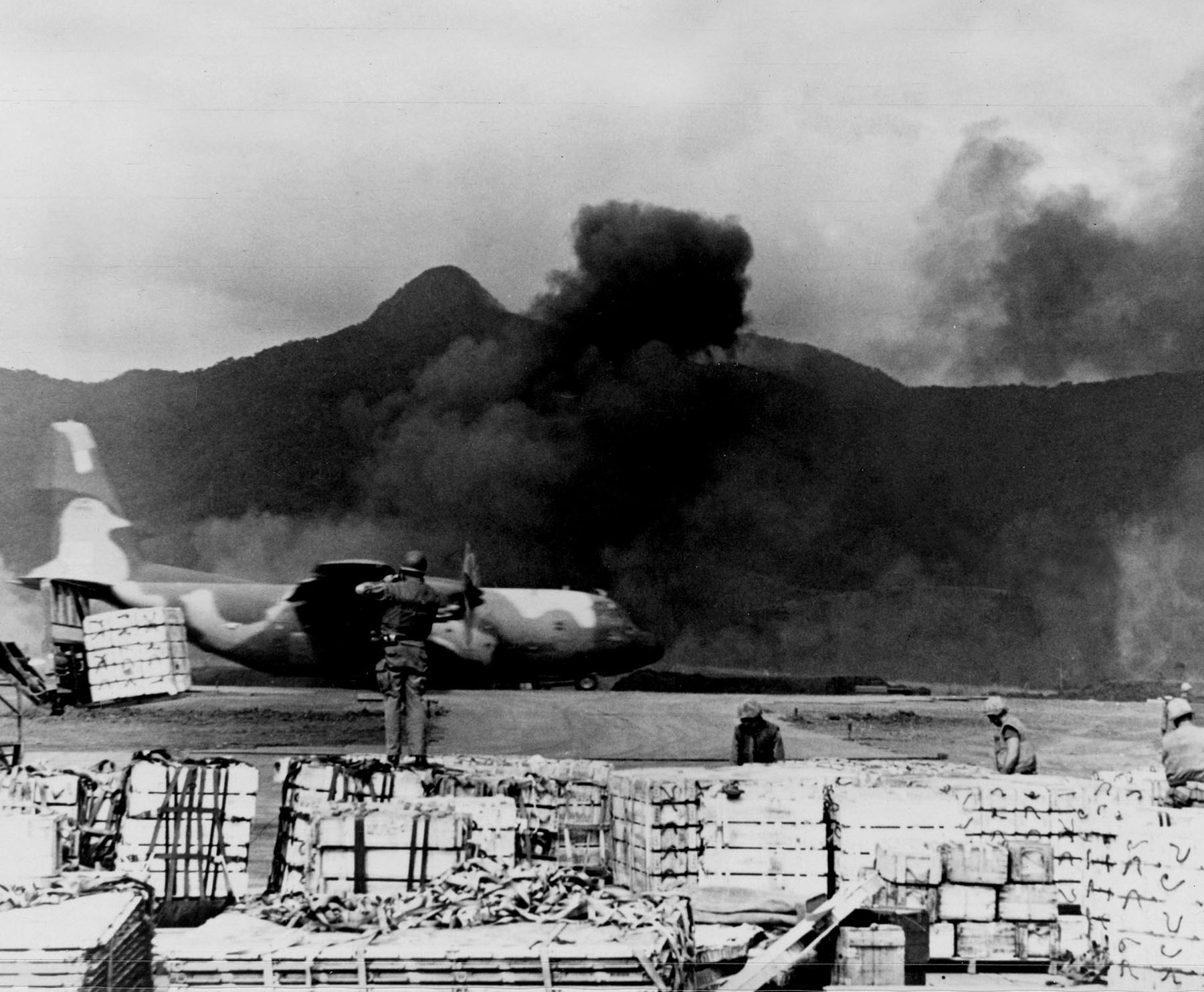
Squadron C-130 Hercules taking off from Khe Sanh

The squadron was reactivated at Forbes Air Force Base, Kansas in 1964, flying Lockheed C-130 Hercules. In March 1965, the 29th became the first combat-ready unit of Tactical Air Command at Forbes. It then assumed a commitment to rotate aircraft to the Panama Canal Zone. The squadron frequently deployed to support airlift requirements of overseas commands, participate in tactical exercises and disaster relief.

In December 1965 the squadron left Forbes for Clark Air Base, Philippines, arriving in late January 1966 to perform theater airlift in Southeast Asia as part of 315th Air Division. The unit deployed aircraft and crews to provide intra-theater airlift for United States military civic actions, combat support and civic assistance throughout the Republic of Vietnam, particularly from the C-130 operating location at Tan Son Nhut Airport outside Saigon. In May 1969, the unit assumed the Commando Vault mission, dropping a 10,000-pound bomb designed to clear helicopter landing zones out of jungle from its cargo bay. The squadron was inactivated in October 1970 and its remaining aircraft and crews were distributed among the 463d Tactical Airlift Wing's other squadrons.

The squadron was reactivated in April 1971 at Langley Air Force Base, Virginia and began training with C-130s. Shortly after becoming combat ready, in November its mission, equipment and personnel were transferred to the 38th Tactical Airlift Squadron and the 29th was inactivated.

=== Weapons system training ===
The squadron was redesignated the 29th Weapons Squadron and reactivated in June 2003 at Little Rock Air Force Base, Arkansas as part of the USAF Mobility Weapons School and equipped with C-130 Hercules. The squadron was reassigned to the USAF Weapons School at Nellis Air Force Base, Nevada in 2006. In August 2014 the squadron established a detachment at Rosecrans Field, Missouri to conduct the Weapons Instructor Course for Air National Guard and Air Force Reserve aircrews flying the C-130H. This allowed the elements at Little Rock the ability to focus primarily on the C-130J.

== Lineage ==
- Constituted as the 29th Transport Squadron on 28 January 1942

Activated on 2 March 1942
Redesignated 29th Troop Carrier Squadron on 4 July 1942
Inactivated on 22 September 1945

- Activated on 30 September 1946

Redesignated: 29th Troop Carrier Squadron, Heavy on 30 July 1948
Redesignated: 29th Troop Carrier Squadron, Special on 1 February 1949
Inactivated on 18 September 1949

- Redesignated 29th Troop Carrier Squadron, Medium on 26 November 1952

Activated on 1 February 1953
Inactivated on 8 June 1955

- Activated on 15 June 1964 (not organized)

Organized on 1 October 1964
Redesignated 29th Troop Carrier Squadron on 1 January 1967
Redesignated 29th Tactical Airlift Squadron on 1 August 1967
Inactivated on 31 October 1970

- Activated on 1 April 1971

Inactivated on 15 November 1971

- Redesignated 29th Weapons Squadron on 30 May 2003

Activated on 1 June 2003

=== Assignments ===
- 313th Transport Group (later 313 Troop Carrier Group), 2 March 1942 – 22 September 1945
- 313th Troop Carrier Group, 30 September 1946 – 18 September 1949
- 313th Troop Carrier Group, 1 February 1953 – 8 June 1955
- Tactical Air Command, 15 June 1964 (not organized)
- 313th Troop Carrier Wing, 1 October 1964
- 315th Air Division, 27 January 1966
- 463d Troop Carrier Wing (later 463d Tactical Airlift Wing), 25 March 1966 – 31 October 1970
- 316th Tactical Airlift Wing, 1 April – 15 November 1971
- USAF Mobility Weapons School, 1 June 2003
- USAF Weapons School, 5 July 2006 – present

=== Stations ===
- Daniel Field, Georgia, 2 March 1942
- Bowman Field, Kentucky, 21 June 1942
- Florence Army Air Field, South Carolina, 4 August 1942
- Laurinburg-Maxton Army Air Base, North Carolina, 13 December 1942 – 25 April 1943
- Oujda Airfield, French Morocco, 11 May 1943
- Kairouan Airfield, Tunisia, 16 June 1943
- Sciacca Airfield, Sicily, Italy, 4 September 1943
- Trapani/Milo Airdrome, Sicily, 3 October 1943
- RAF Folkingham (AAF-484), England, 23 February 1944
- Achiet Airfield (B-54), France, 28 March 1945 – 5 August 1945
- Camp Myles Standish, Massachusetts, 21–22 September 1945
- Capodichino Airport, Naples, Italy, 30 September 1946
- Pisa Airfield, Italy, 5 March 1947
- Tulln Air Base, Austria, 5 May – 25 June 1947
- Langley Field, Virginia, 25 June 1947
- Bergstrom Field (later Bergstron Air Force Base), Texas, 15 July 1947 – 22 October 1948
- RAF Fassberg, Germany (later West Germany), 9 November 1948 – 18 September 1949
- Mitchel Air Force Base, New York, 1 February 1953
- Sewart Air Force Base, Tennessee, 2 October 1953 – 8 June 1955
- Forbes Air Force Base, Kansas, 1 October 1964 – c. December 1965
- Clark Air Base, Philippines, 27 January 1966 – 31 October 1970
- Langley Air Force Base, Virginia, 1 April – 15 November 1971
- Little Rock Air Force Base, Arkansas, 1 June 2003 – present

=== Aircraft ===
- Douglas C-47 Skytrain, 1942–1945, 1946–1948
- Douglas C-53 Skytrooper, 1942–1943
- Curtiss C-46 Commando, 1945, 1953
- Fairchild C-82 Packet, 1947–1948
- Douglas C-54 Skymaster, 1948–1949
- Fairchild C-119 Flying Boxcar, 1953–1955
- Lockheed C-130 Hercules, 1964–1970, 1971, 2003–present

== See also ==
- List of Douglas C-47 Skytrain operators
- List of Lockheed C-130 Hercules operators
- List of United States Air Force airlift squadrons
- List of United States Air Force squadrons
