= 49th Troop Carrier Squadron =

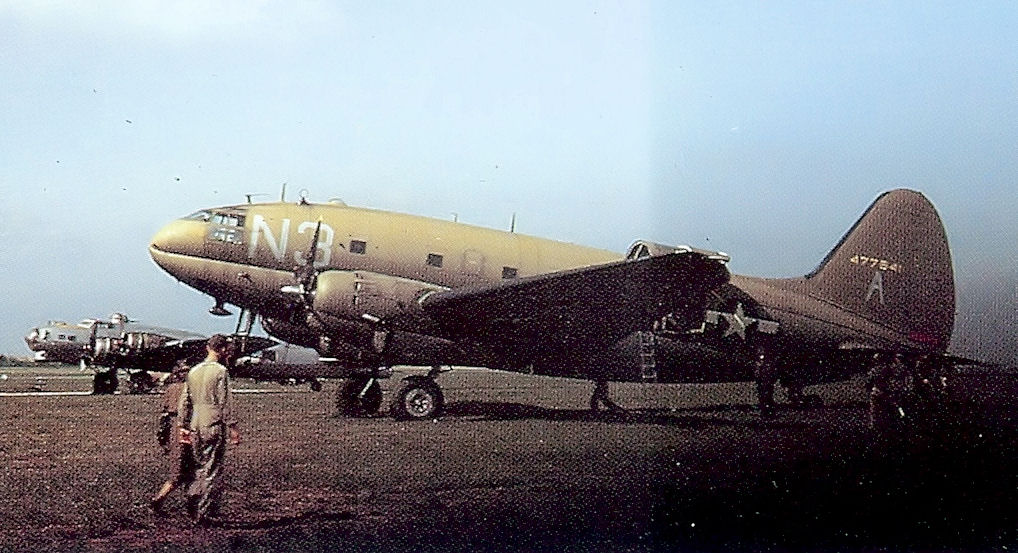
- 313th Troop Carrier Group C-46 Commando (Note: Aircraft is Curtiss C-46D-10-CU Commando serial 44-77541 at Achiet Airfield in April 1945. Shortly after this picture was taken the plane was damaged and written off.)
- Active: 1942–1945
- Country: United States
- Branch: United States Air Force
- Role: Airlift
- Part of: IX Troop Carrier Command
- Engagements: European Theater of Operations; Mediterranean Theater of Operations
- Decorations: Distinguished Unit Citation

Insignia
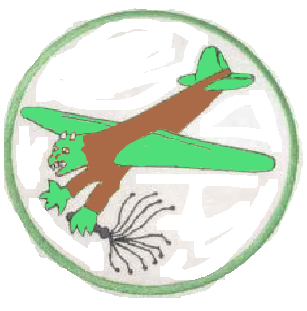
- 49th Troop Carrier Squadron emblem (approved 13 January 1943)
- IX Troop Carrier Command fuselage code: H2

The 49th Troop Carrier Squadron is an inactive United States Air Force unit. Its last assignment was with the 313th Troop Carrier Group at Camp Myles Standish, Massachusetts, where it was inactivated on 22 September 1945.

The squadron was first activated as the 49th Transport Squadron in June 1942. As the 49th Troop Carrier Squadron, it flew Douglas C-47 Skytrains in the Mediterranean Theater of Operations during World War II, earning Distinguished Unit Citations for carrying reinforcements to Sicily despite fire from ground and naval forces in July 1943, and for participation in Operation Overlord in June 1944. It converted to Curtiss C-46 Commandos, with which it took part in Operation Varsity. After V-E Day, the squadron returned to the United States, where it was inactivated.

== History ==
The squadron as activated at Daniel Field, Georgia in June 1942 as the 49th Transport Squadron, when the 313th Transport Group expanded from a headquarters and a single squadron, the 29th Troop Carrier Squadron, to a four squadron group. The squadron trained under Air Transport Command with Douglas C-47 Skytrains. A few weeks after the squadron's activation, the Army Air Forces gave the "transport" designation to its strategic airlift units, and the squadron became the 49th Troop Carrier Squadron under I Troop Carrier Command. The 49th trained in the southeastern United States until April 1943, when it deployed to North Africa.

=== Mediterranean operations ===
The squadron began flying combat missions from Oujda Airfield in French Morocco. It performed troop carrier and transport airlift of supplies to ground forces advancing through Algeria into Tunisia as part Twelfth Air Force. It also evacuated wounded from the battle area.

Although the 49th did not take part in the first airdrop of Operation Husky, the Allied invasion of Sicily, two days later, 11 July 1943, the squadron was part of a formation of troop carrier units of the 52d Troop Carrier Wing bringing reinforcements, planning to drop paratroops near Gela. Planes of the 313th Group led the stream of troop carriers. However, attacks in the Gela area by enemy aircraft had sunk two ships and forced other ships in the invasion force to disperse. The heaviest enemy attack came at 2150 hours. Fifty minutes later, the first 313th Group aircraft approached the drop zone. The 49th was able to successfully make its drop on Farello Airfield. Mistaking the troop carriers for another enemy attack, ships of the assault force and antiaircraft units ashore began a heavy fire on squadron's C-47s as they departed. Of the 144 planes of the 52d Wing that participated in the mission, 23 were shot down and an additional 37 were heavily damaged. For its completion of this mission the squadron earned its first Distinguished Unit Citation (DUC).

=== European operations ===
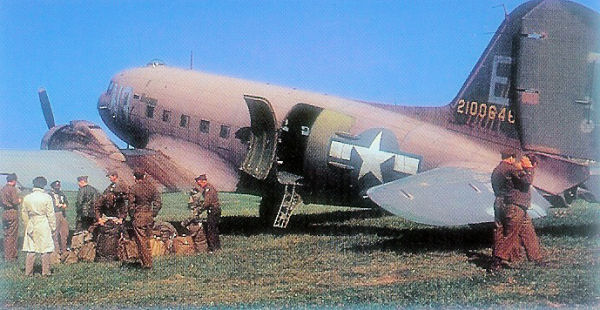
313th Troop Carrier Group C-47

In February 1944, the squadron moved to RAF Folkingham, England, where it became part of IX Troop Carrier Command and began training for the assault on the continent of Europe. On D-Day the squadron dropped paratroopers near Picauville, Normandy and dropped reinforcements the following day. The squadron's efforts during Operation Overlord earned it a second DUC.

On 17 September, the squadron participated in Operation Market Garden, the airborne assault on the Netherlands, when it dropped troopers near Arnhem and Nijmegen. In February 1945, the squadron moved to Achiet Airfield in France, where it began converting to Curtiss C-46 Commandos in preparation for Operation Varsity, the airborne assault across the Rhine. On 24 March 1945 it dropped elements of the 17th Airborne Division near Wesel.

The squadron continued to operate from Achiet during 1945, performing transportation of personnel and supplies within Europe. It evacuated wounded and former prisoners of war and brought gasoline, ammunition to forward areas. After V-E Day, it continued to transport medical equipment and other supplies. In September, the squadron's personnel returned to the United States and it was inactivated on arrival at the port of embarkation.

== Lineage ==
- Constituted as the 49th Transport Squadron on 15 June 1942

Activated on 2 March 1942
Redesignated 49th Troop Carrier Squadron on 4 July 1942
Inactivated on 22 September 1945

=== Assignments ===
- 313th Transport Group (later Troop Carrier Group), 2 March 1942 – 22 September 1945

=== Stations ===
- Daniel Field, Georgia, 15 January 1942
- Bowman Field, Kentucky, 21 June 1942
- Florence Army Air Field, South Carolina, 4 August 1942
- Laurinburg-Maxton Army Air Base, North Carolina, 13 December 1942 – 25 April 1943
- Oujda Airfield, French Morocco, 11 May 1943
- Kairouan Airfield, Tunisia, 16 June 1943
- Sciacca Airdrome, Sicily, Italy 4 September 1943
- Trapani/Milo Airfield, Sicily, Italy, 3 October 1943 – 15 February 1944
- RAF Folkingham (AAF-484), England, 24 February 1944
- Achiet Airfield (B-54), France, 28 March-5 August 1945
- Camp Myles Standish, Massachusetts, 21–22 September 1945

=== Aircraft ===
- C-47 Skytrain, 1942–1945
- C-46 Commando, 1945

=== Awards and campaigns ===
Award streamer	Award	Dates	Notes
	Distinguished Unit Citation	11 July 1943	Sicily 49th Troop Carrier Squadron
	Distinguished Unit Citation	6–7 June 1944	Normandy 49th Troop Carrier Squadron

Campaign Streamer	Campaign	Dates	Notes
	Sicily	14 May 1943 – 17 August 1943	49th Troop Carrier Squadron
	Naples-Foggia	18 August 1943 – 21 January 1944	49th Troop Carrier Squadron
	Rome-Arno	22 January 1944 – 15 February 1944	49th Troop Carrier Squadron
	Northern France	25 July 1944 – 14 September 1944	49th Troop Carrier Squadron
	Rhineland	15 September 1944 – 21 March 1945	49th Troop Carrier Squadron
	Central Europe	22 March 1944 – 21 May 1945	49th Troop Carrier Squadron
