= 47th Airlift Flight =

47th Airlift Flight

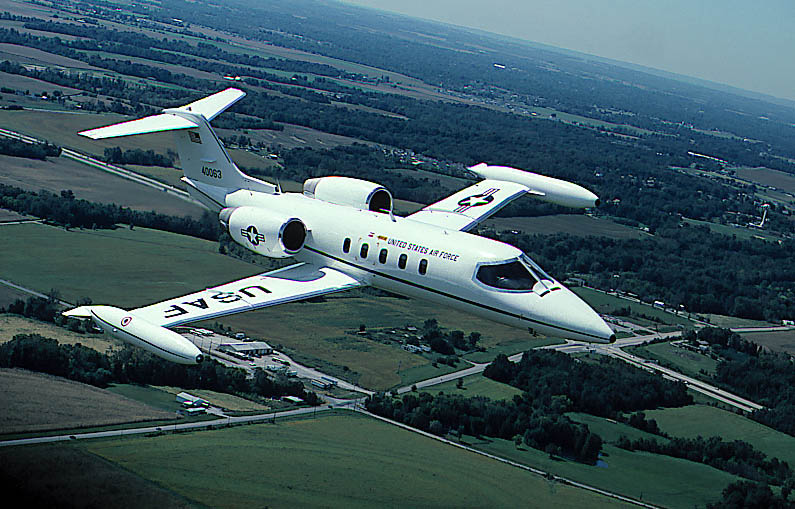
- Learjet C-21 as flown by the 47th
- Active: 1942–1945; 1946–1949; 1953–1955; 1964–1973; 1993–2004
- Country: United States
- Branch: United States Air Force
- Role: Airlift
- Part of: Air Force Materiel Command
- Engagements: Mediterranean Theater of Operations; European Theater of Operations
- Decorations: Distinguished Unit Citation; Air Force Outstanding Unit Award

Insignia
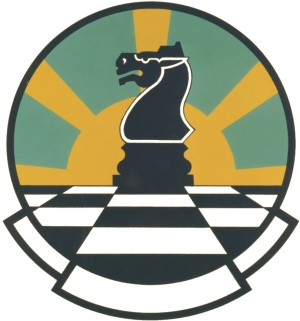
- 47th Airlift Flight emblem (approved 28 July 1970)

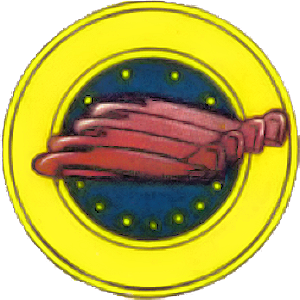
- 47th Troop Carrier Squadron emblem (approved 27 February 1943)
- Squadron fuselage code with IX Troop Carrier Command: N3

The 47th Airlift Flight is an inactive United States Air Force unit. Its last assignment was with the 375th Airlift Wing at Wright-Patterson Air Force Base, Ohio, where it served as an operational support airlift flight, operating Learjet C-21s from 1997 until 2004.

The flight was first activated as the 47th Transport Squadron in June 1942. As the 47th Troop Carrier Squadron, it flew Douglas C-47 Skytrains in the Mediterranean Theater of Operations during World War II, earning Distinguished Unit Citations for carrying reinforcements to Sicily despite fire from ground and naval forces in July 1943, and for participation in Operation Overlord in June 1944. It converted to Curtiss C-46 Commandos, with which it took part in Operation Varsity. After V-E Day, the squadron returned to the United States, where it was inactivated.

The squadron was activated in Italy in 1946, but in 1947 was transferred to the United States on paper and began to train with Fairchild C-82 Packets. The following year, the 47th returned to Europe to participate in the Berlin Airlift with Douglas C-54 Skymasters. After the successful completion of the airlift, the squadron was again inactivated in 1949. The squadron was briefly active from 1953 to 1955 at Mitchel Air Force Base, New York and Sewart Air Force Base, Tennessee as a Fairchild C-119 Flying Boxcar unit.

The squadron was again active from 1964 to 1973, when it conducted airlift missions with Lockheed C-130 Hercules transports under Tactical Air Command, frequently deploying aircraft and crews to overseas locations.

== History ==
=== World War II ===
The flight as activated at Daniel Field, Georgia in June 1942 as the 47th Transport Squadron, when the 313th Transport Group expanded from a headquarters and a single squadron, the 29th Troop Carrier Squadron, to a four squadron group. The squadron trained under Air Transport Command as a Douglas C-47 Skytrain squadron. A few weeks after the squadron's activation, the Army Air Forces gave the "transport" designation to its strategic airlift units, and the squadron became the 47th Troop Carrier Squadron under I Troop Carrier Command. The 47th trained in the southeastern United States until April 1943, when it deployed to North Africa.

==== Mediterranean operations ====
The squadron began flying combat missions from Oujda Airfield in French Morocco. It performed troop carrier and transport airlift of supplies to ground forces advancing through Algeria into Tunisia as part Twelfth Air Force. it also evacuated wounded from the battle area.

The 47th, along with the 29th and 48th Squadrons of the 313th Group, took part in Operation Husky, the invasion of Sicily. Although blown far off course on the first airdrops on the island by strong winds, managed to drop their paratroops near Avola, where they were able to assist British forces in seizing that town. Two days later, 11 July 1943, the squadron was part of a formation of troop carrier units of the 52d Troop Carrier Wing bringing reinforcements, planning to drop paratroops near Gela. Planes of the 313th Group led the stream of troop carriers. However, attacks in the Gela area by enemy aircraft had sunk two ships and forced other ships in the invasion force to disperse. The heaviest enemy attack came at 2150 hours. Fifty minutes later, the first 313th Group aircraft approached the drop zone. The 47th was able to successfully make its drop on Farello Airfield. Mistaking the troop carriers for another enemy attack, ships of the assault force and antiaircraft units ashore began a heavy fire on squadron's C-47s as they departed. Of the 144 planes of the 52d Wing that participated in the mission, 23 were shot down and an additional 37 were heavily damaged. For its completion of this mission the squadron earned its first Distinguished Unit Citation (DUC).

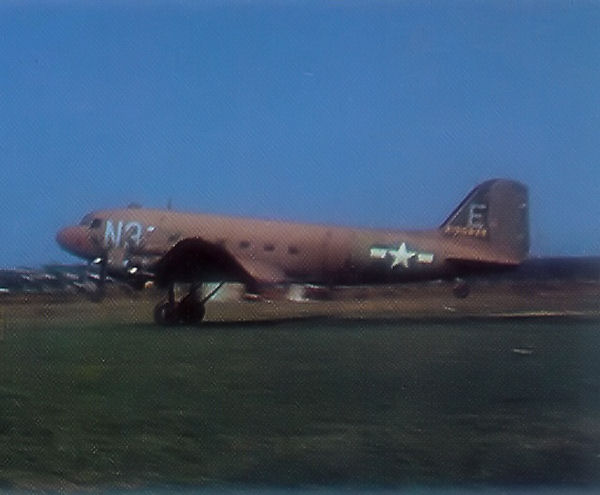
47th Troop Carrier Squadron C-47

In September, the squadron moved to Sicily to prepare for Operation Avalanche, the invasion of Italy. It dropped troopers of the 82d Airborne Division near Salerno on 13 September and brought reinforcements to the area in the following days. It then resumed theater airlift missions for the remainder of 1943.

==== European operations ====
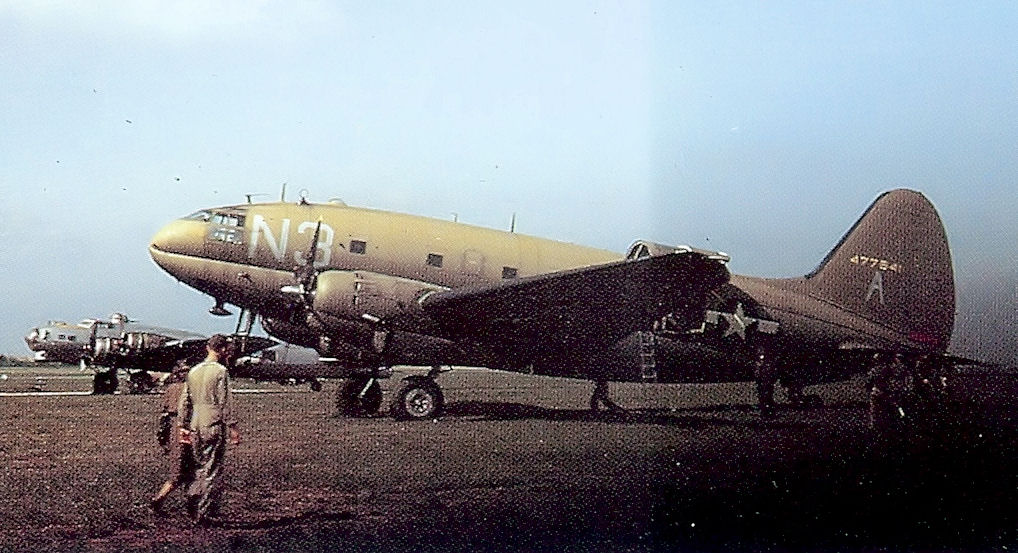
47th Troop Carrier Squadron C-46 Commando (Note: Aircraft is Curtiss C-46D-10-CU Commando serial 44-77541 at Achiet Airfield in April 1945. Shortly after this picture was taken the plane was damaged and written off.)

In February 1944, the squadron moved to RAF Folkingham, England, where it became part of IX Troop Carrier Command and began training for the assault on the continent of Europe. On D-Day the squadron dropped paratroopers near Picauville, Normandy and dropped reinforcements the following day. The squadron's efforts during Operation Overlord earned it a second DUC.

On 17 September, the squadron participated in Operation Market Garden, the airborne assault on the Netherlands, when it dropped troopers near Arnhem and Nijmegen. In February 1945, the squadron moved to Achiet Airfield in France, where it began converting to Curtiss C-46 Commandos in preparation for Operation Varsity, the airborne assault across the Rhine. On 24 March 1945 it dropped elements of the 17th Airborne Division near Wesel.

The squadron continued to operate from Achiet during 1945, performing transportation of personnel and supplies within Europe. It evacuated wounded and former prisoners of war and brought gasoline, ammunition to forward areas. After V-E Day, it continued to transport medical equipment and other supplies. In September, the squadron's personnel returned to the United States and it was inactivated on arrival at the port of embarkation.

=== Berlin Airlift ===
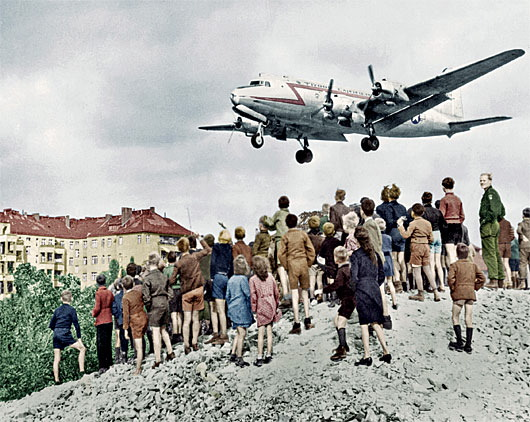
C-54 landing at Tempelhof Central Airport in 1948

The squadron was reactivated at Capodichino Airport near Naples, Italy where it served as part of the European Air Transport Service, returning to operating the C-47. In June 1947, the squadron was moved (less its personnel and equipment) back to the United States. In July, it moved to Bergstrom Field, Texas, where it was manned and began to train with Fairchild C-82 Packet aircraft and gliders.

In October 1948, the squadron left its Packets behind and moved to RAF Fassberg, Germany to reinforce United States Air Forces in Europe in the Berlin Airlift as winter approached and the demand for supplies increased. At Fassberg, the squadron was equipped with Douglas C-54 Skymasters, with which it flew food, medicine and coal into Berlin. Berlin Airlift operations continued until the end of September 1949, when with the Soviet blockade of Berlin ended, and faced with President Truman's smaller 1949 defense budget, the Air Force was required to reduce the number of its groups to 48. The 313th Group and its squadrons, including the 47th, were inactivated on 30 September 1949.

=== Tactical Air Command ===
The squadron was activated at Mitchel Air Force Base, New York on 1 April 1953, when it assumed the mission, personnel, and Fairchild C-119 Flying Boxcars of the 336th Troop Carrier Squadron, a reserve unit that had been called to active duty for the Korean War. That October, the 47th moved to Sewart Air Force Base, where it performed airlift missions under the control of Eighteenth Air Force until inactivating in June 1955.

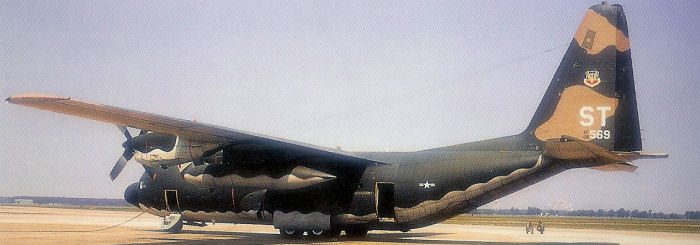
C-130 as flown by the squadron at Forbes and Dyess

In October 1964 the squadron was reactivated at Forbes Air Force Base, Kansas as a Lockheed C-130 Hercules squadron when Tactical Air Command replaced Strategic Air Command as the base operator and the squadron's parent 313th Troop Carrier Wing became the host wing. The squadron frequently deployed crews and aircraft to support the requirements of overseas commanders. With the forthcoming closure of Forbes in 1973, the squadron moved to Dyess Air Force Base, Texas in July 1973, where the 463d Tactical Airlift Wing was adding a third Hercules squadron. However, on 1 August, the squadron was inactivated and its personnel and equipment were transferred to the 774th Tactical Airlift Squadron, which moved to Dyess on paper from Mactan Air Base in the Philippines as the United States withdrew forces from Southeast Asia.

=== Operational support airlift ===
The squadron was redesignated the 47th Airlift Flight and activated on 31 May 1993 at Wright-Patterson Air Force Base, Ohio. It transported personnel, primarily for the Aeronautical Systems Center and Air Force Materiel Command, using Learjet C-21s. In April 1997, Air Mobility Command assumed control of operational support airlift within the United States and the squadron became part of the 375th Airlift Wing, while retaining the same mission. The squadron was awarded three Air Force Outstanding Unit Awards for performing this mission. It was inactivated on 30 September 2004, and its mission, personnel and aircraft were transferred to the 54th Airlift Squadron, which moved without personnel or equipment from Maxwell Air Force Base, Alabama to Wright-Patterson.

== Lineage ==
- Constituted as the 47th Transport Squadron on 30 May 1942

Activated on 15 June 1942
Redesignated 47th Troop Carrier Squadron on 4 July 1942
Inactivated on 22 September 1945

- Activated on 30 September 1946

Redesignated 47th Troop Carrier Squadron, Heavy on 30 July 1948
Redesignated 47th Troop Carrier Squadron, Special on 1 February 1949
Inactivated on 18 September 1949

- Redesignated 47th Troop Carrier Squadron, Medium on 26 November 1952

Activated on 1 February 1953
Inactivated on 8 June 1955

- Activated on 15 June 1964 (not organized)

Organized on 1 October 1964
Redesignated 47th Troop Carrier Squadron on 1 March 1966
Redesignated 47th Tactical Airlift Squadron on 1 May 1967
Inactivated on 1 August 1973

- Redesignated 47 Airlift Flight on 1 May 1993

Activated on 31 May 1993
Inactivated on 30 September 2004

=== Assignments ===
- 313th Transport Group (later 313th Troop Carrier Group), 15 June 1942 – 22 September 1945
- 313th Troop Carrier Group, 30 September 1946 – 18 September 1949
- 313th Troop Carrier Group, 1 February 1953 – 8 June 1955
- Tactical Air Command, 15 June 1964 (not organized)
- 313th Troop Carrier Wing (later 313th Tactical Airlift Wing), 1 October 1964
- 463d Tactical Airlift Wing, 6 July – 1 August 1973
- 645th Logistics and Operations Group, 31 May 1993
- 88th Air Base Wing, 1 October 1994
- 88th Operations Support Squadron, 1 July 1995
- 457th Airlift Squadron, 1 April 1997 – 30 September 2004

=== Stations ===
- Daniel Field, Georgia, 15 June 1942
- Bowman Field, Kentucky, 21 June 1942
- Florence Army Air Field, South Carolina, 4 August 1942
- Laurinburg-Maxton Army Air Base, North Carolina, 13 December 1942 – 25 April 1943
- Oujda Airfield, French Morocco, 11 May 1943
- Kairouan Airfield, Tunisia, 16 June 1943
- Sciacca Airport, Sicily, Italy, 4 September 1943
- Trapani-Milo Airport Sicily, Italy, 3 October 1943 – 15 February 1944
- RAF Folkingham (AAF-484), England, 24 February 1944
- Achiet Airfield (B-40), France, 28 March – 5 August 1945
- Camp Myles Standish, Massachusetts, 21–22 September 1945
- Capodichino Airport, Italy, 30 September 1946
- Pisa Airfield, Italy, 5 March 1947
- Tulln Air Base, Austria, 5 May – 25 June 1947
- Langley Field, Virginia, 25 June 1947
- Bergstrom Field (later Bergstrom Air Force Base), Texas, 15 July 1947 – 22 October 1948
- RAF Fassberg, Germany, 9 November 1948 – 18 September 1949
- Mitchel Air Force Base, New York, 1 February 1953
- Sewart Air Force Base, Tennessee, 2 October 1953 – 8 June 1955
- Forbes Air Force Base, Kansas, 1 October 1964
- Dyess Air Force Base, Texas, 6 July – 1 August 1973
- Wright-Patterson Air Force Base, Ohio, 31 May 1993 – 30 September 2004

=== Aircraft ===
- Douglas C-47 Skytrain, 1942–1945, 1946–1948
- Curtiss C-46 Commando, 1945; 1953
- Fairchild C-82 Packet, 1947–1948
- Douglas C-54 Skymaster 1948–1949
- Fairchild C-119 Flying Boxcar, 1953–1955
- Lockheed C-130 Hercules, 1964–1973
- Learjet C-21, 1997–2004

== See also ==
- List of United States Air Force airlift squadrons
- List of Douglas C-47 Skytrain operators
- List of C-130 Hercules operators
- List of North African airfields during World War II
- Advanced Landing Ground
