= 48th Airlift Squadron =

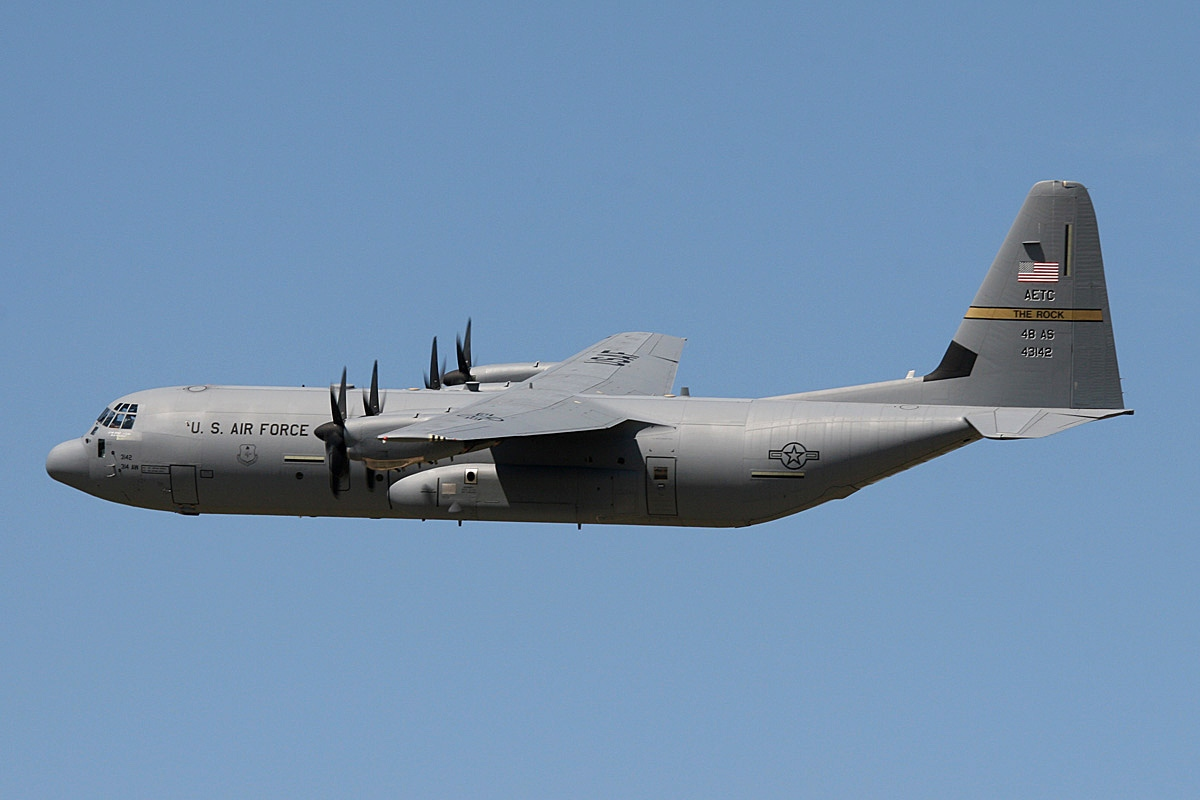
- 48th Airlift Squadron C-130J-30 Hercules
- Active: 1942–1945; 1946–1949; 1953–1955; 1964–1967; 1971–1973; 2003–2018
- Country: United States
- Branch: United States Air Force
- Role: Airlift Training
- Part of: Air Education and Training Command
- Garrison/HQ: Little Rock Air Force Base
- Mascot: Grasshopper
- Engagements: Mediterranean Theater; European Theater
- Decorations: Distinguished Unit Citation; Air Force Outstanding Unit Award

Insignia
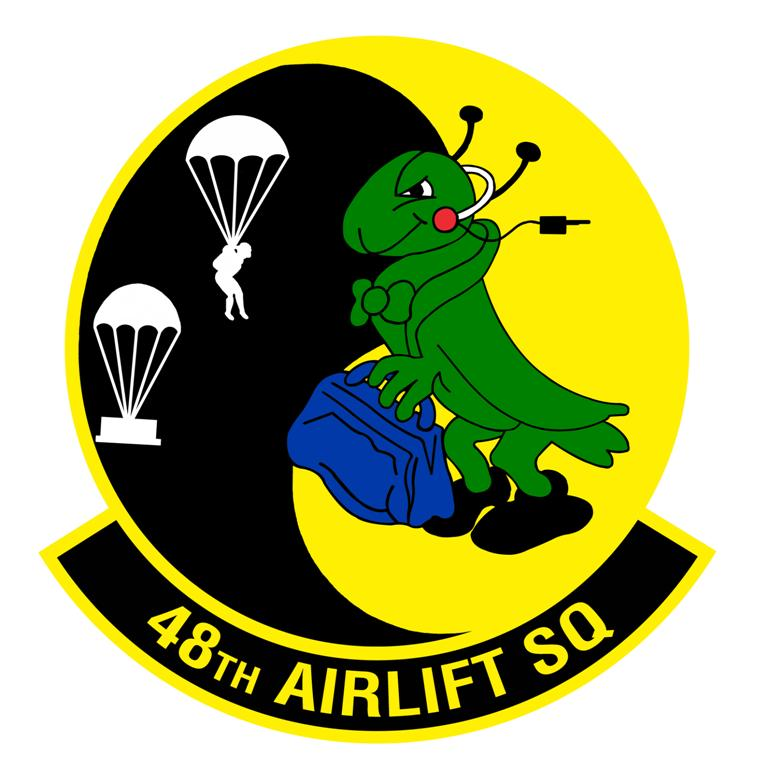
- 48th Airlift Squadron emblem (approved 30 August 1954)

The 48th Airlift Squadron was part of the 314th Airlift Wing at Little Rock Air Force Base, Arkansas. It operated Lockheed Martin C-130J Super Hercules aircraft, conducting pilot and loadmaster training for airlift and airdrop operations. The 48th officially inactivated on November 4, 2016.

The squadron was first activated as the 48th Transport Squadron in June 1942. As the 48th Troop Carrier Squadron, it flew Douglas C-47 Skytrains in the Mediterranean Theater of Operations during World War II, earning Distinguished Unit Citations for carrying reinforcements to Sicily despite fire from ground and naval forces in July 1943, and for participation in Operation Overlord in June 1944. It converted to Curtiss C-46 Commandos, with which it took part in Operation Varsity. After V-E Day, the squadron returned to the United States, where it was inactivated.

The squadron was activated in Austria in 1946, but in 1947 was transferred to the United States on paper and began to train with Fairchild C-82 Packets. The following year, the 47th returned to Europe to participate in the Berlin Airlift with Douglas C-54 Skymasters. After the successful completion of the airlift, the squadron was again inactivated in 1949. The squadron was briefly active from 1953 to 1955 at Mitchel Air Force Base, New York and Sewart Air Force Base, Tennessee as a Fairchild C-119 Flying Boxcar unit.

== History ==
=== World War II ===
The squadron as activated at Daniel Field, Georgia in June 1942 as the 48th Transport Squadron, when the 313th Transport Group expanded from a headquarters and a single squadron, the 29th Troop Carrier Squadron, to a four squadron group. The squadron trained under Air Transport Command with Douglas C-47 Skytrain and the C-53 Skytrooper modification of the C-47. A few weeks after the squadron's activation, the Army Air Forces gave the "transport" designation to its strategic airlift units, and the squadron became the 48th Troop Carrier Squadron under I Troop Carrier Command. The 47th trained in the southeastern United States until April 1943, when it deployed to North Africa.

==== Mediterranean operations ====
The squadron began flying combat missions from Oujda Airfield in French Morocco. It performed troop carrier and transport airlift of supplies to ground forces advancing through Algeria into Tunisia as part Twelfth Air Force. it also evacuated wounded from the battle area.

The 48th, along with the 29th and 47th Squadrons of the 313th Group, took part in Operation Husky, the invasion of Sicily. Although blown far off course on the first airdrops on the island by strong winds, the squadron managed to drop their paratroops near Avola, where they were able to assist British forces in seizing that town. Two days later, 11 July 1943, the squadron was part of a formation of troop carrier units of the 52d Troop Carrier Wing bringing reinforcements, planning to drop paratroops near Gela. Planes of the 313th Group led the stream of troop carriers. However, attacks in the Gela area by enemy aircraft had sunk two ships and forced other ships in the invasion force to disperse. The heaviest enemy attack came at 2150 hours. Fifty minutes later, the first 313th Group aircraft approached the drop zone. The 48th was able to successfully make its drop on Farello Airfield. Mistaking the troop carriers for another enemy attack, ships of the assault force and antiaircraft units ashore began a heavy fire on squadron's C-47s as they departed. Of the 144 planes of the 52d Wing that participated in the mission, 23 were shot down and an additional 37 were heavily damaged. For its completion of this mission the squadron earned its first Distinguished Unit Citation (DUC).

It moved to Sicily for Operation Avalanche, the invasion of Italy. It dropped paratroopers of 82d Airborne Division south of Salerno on the night of 13 September 1943 and flew a reinforcement mission the following night.

==== European operations ====
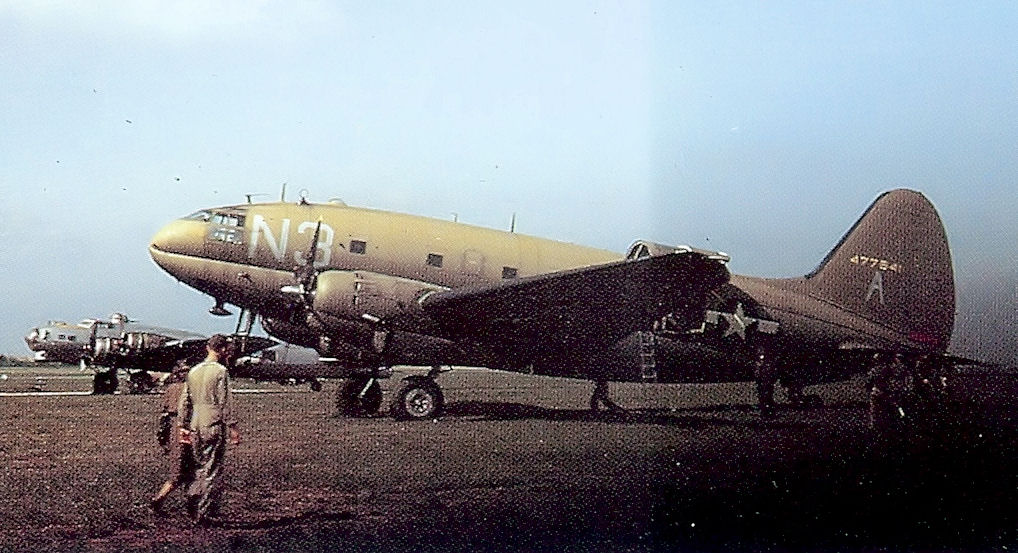
313th Troop Carrier Group C-46 Commando (Note: Aircraft is Curtiss C-46D-10-CU Commando serial 44-77541 at Achiet Airfield in April 1945. Shortly after this picture was taken the plane was damaged and written off.)

In February 1944, the squadron moved to RAF Folkingham, England, where it became part of IX Troop Carrier Command and began training for the assault on the continent of Europe. On D-Day the squadron dropped paratroopers near Picauville, Normandy and dropped reinforcements the following day. The squadron's efforts during Operation Overlord earned it a second DUC.

On 17 September, the squadron participated in Operation Market Garden, the airborne assault on the Netherlands, when it dropped troopers near Arnhem and Nijmegen. In February 1945, the squadron moved to Achiet Airfield in France, where it began converting to Curtiss C-46 Commandos in preparation for Operation Varsity, the airborne assault across the Rhine. On 24 March 1945 it dropped elements of the 17th Airborne Division near Wesel.

The squadron continued to operate from Achiet during 1945, performing transportation of personnel and supplies within Europe. It evacuated wounded and former prisoners of war and brought gasoline, ammunition to forward areas. After V-E Day, it continued to transport medical equipment and other supplies. In September, the squadron's personnel returned to the United States and it was inactivated on arrival at the port of embarkation.

=== Berlin Airlift ===
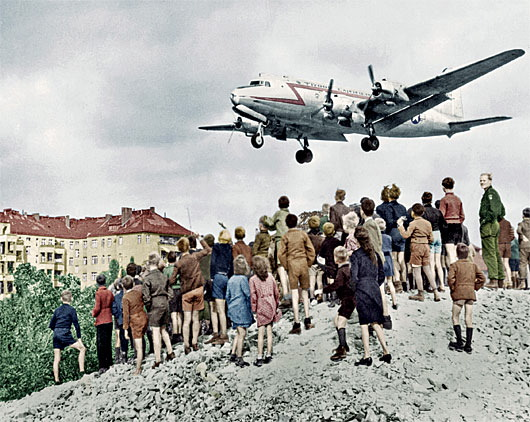
C-54 landing at Tempelhof Central Airport in 1948.

The squadron was reactivated at Tulln Air Base, Austria, where it formed part of the occupation forces and served as part of the European Air Transport Service, returning to operating the C-47. In June 1947, the squadron was moved (less its personnel and equipment) back to the United States. In July, it moved to Bergstrom Field, Texas, where it was manned and began to train with Fairchild C-82 Packet aircraft and gliders.

In July 1948, the squadron deployed to Rhein-Main Air Base to reinforce United States Air Forces in Europe in the Berlin Airlift. As winter approached and the demand for supplies increased it moved to RAF Fassberg, Germany, and began to operate Douglas C-54 Skymasters, with which it flew food, medicine and coal into Berlin. Berlin Airlift operations continued until September 1949, when with the Soviet blockade of Berlin ended, and faced with President Truman’s smaller 1949 defense budget, the Air Force was required to reduce the number of its groups to 48. The squadron was inactivated in September 1949.

=== Tactical Air Command ===
The squadron was activated at Mitchel Air Force Base, New York on 1 April 1953, when it assumed the mission, personnel, and Fairchild C-119 Flying Boxcars of the 337th Troop Carrier Squadron, a reserve unit that had been called to active duty for the Korean War. That October, the 48th moved to Sewart Air Force Base, where it performed airlift missions under the control of Eighteenth Air Force until inactivating in June 1955.

Reactivated as a Lockheed C-130 Hercules Troop Carrier (later Tactical Airlift) squadron under TAC in 1964. The 48th provided airlift for airborne forces from 1965 to 1967. It deployed aircraft and crews to France and England, October 1965 – March 1967 and to Panama Canal Zone, March–June 1967. It provided intra-theater airlift and support of U.S. Army airborne forces from 1971 to 1973.

=== Air Education and Training Command ===
In 2003, the 48th Airlift Squadron was reactivated as the initial active-duty C-130J Super Hercules Formal Training Unit at Little Rock Air Force Base.

=== Decorations ===
- Decorations. Distinguished Unit Citations: Sicily, 11 July 1943; France [6–7] Jun 1944. Air Force Outstanding Unit Awards: [1 Dec] 2003–30 Jun 2004; 1 July 2005 – 30 June 2006; 1 July 2006 – 30 June 2007; 1 July 2008 – 30 June 2009.

== Lineage ==
- Constituted as the 48th Transport Squadron on 30 May 1942

Activated on 15 June 1942
Redesignated 48th Troop Carrier Squadron on 4 July 1942
Inactivated on 15 November 1945

- Activated on 30 September 1946

Redesignated 48th Troop Carrier Squadron, Heavy on 30 July 1948
Redesignated 48th Troop Carrier Squadron, Special on 1 February 1949
Inactivated on 18 September 1949

- Redesignated 48th Troop Carrier Squadron, Medium on 26 November 1952

Activated on 1 February 1953
Inactivated on 8 June 1955

- Activated on 20 August 1964 (not organized)

Organized on 1 January 1965
Redesignated 48th Troop Carrier Squadron on 1 March 1966
Discontinued and inactivated on 25 June 1967

- Redesignated 48th Tactical Airlift Squadron on 15 June 1971

Activated on 15 November 1971
Inactivated on 1 September 1973

- Redesignated 48th Airlift Squadron on 21 November 2003

Activated on 1 December 2003
Inactivated on 4 November 2016

=== Assignments ===
- 313th Transport Group (later 313th Troop Carrier Group), 15 June 1942 – 15 November 1945
- 313th Troop Carrier Group, 30 September 1946 – 18 September 1949
- 313th Troop Carrier Group, 1 February 1953 – 8 June 1955
- 313th Troop Carrier Wing (later 313th Tactical Airlift) Wing), 1 January 1965 – 25 June 1967
- 313th Tactical Airlift Wing, 15 November 1971
- 314th Tactical Airlift Wing, 6 August–1 September 1973
- 314th Operations Group, 1 December 2003 – 4 November 2016

=== Stations ===
- Daniel Field, Georgia, 2 March 1942
- Bowman Field, Kentucky, 21 June 1942
- Florence Army Air Field, South Carolina, 4 August 1942
- Laurinburg-Maxton Army Air Base, North Carolina, 13 December 1942 – 24 April 1943
- Oujda Airfield, [French Morocco, 9 May 1943
- Kairouan Airfield, Tunisia, 16 June 1943

Air echelon operated from Ponte Olivo Airfield, Sicily, Italy, 27 July–11 August 1943

- Sciacca Airdrome, Sicily, Italy, 6 September 1943
- Trapani/Milo Airfield, Sicily, Italy, 6 October 1943 – 18 February 1944
- RAF Folkingham (AAF-484), England, 3 March 1944
- Achiet Airfield (B-54), France, 6 March–3 August 1945
- Baer Field, Indiana, 26 September–15 November 1945
- AAF Station Illesheim, Germany, 30 September 1946
- Tulln Air Base, Austria, 5 May–25 June 1947
- Langley Field, Virginia, 25 June 1947
- Bergstrom Field (later Bergstrom Air Force Base), Texas, 15 July 1947 – 22 October 1948

Operated from Rhein-Main Air Base, Germany, c. 1 July–8 November 1948

- RAF Fassberg, Germany, 9 November 1948 – 18 September 1949
- Mitchel Air Force Base, New York, 1 February 1953
- Sewart Air Force Base, Tennessee, 2 October 1953 – 8 June 1955
- Forbes Air Force Base, Kansas, 1 January 1965 – 25 June 1967
- Forbes Air Force Base, Kansas, 15 November 1971
- Little Rock Air Force Base, Arkansas, 6 August–1 September 1973
- Little Rock Air Force Base, Arkansas, 1 December 2003 – 4 November 2016

=== Aircraft ===
- Douglas C-47 Skytrain (1942–1945, 1946–1947)
- Douglas C-53 Skytrooper (1942–1945)
- Curtiss C-46 Commando (1945, 1953)
- Douglas C-54 Skymaster (1947–1949)
- Fairchild C-119 Flying Boxcar (1953–1955)
- Lockheed C-130 Hercules (1965–1967, 1971–1973)
- Lockheed Martin C-130J Super Hercules (2003–2016)
