= Daniel Field =

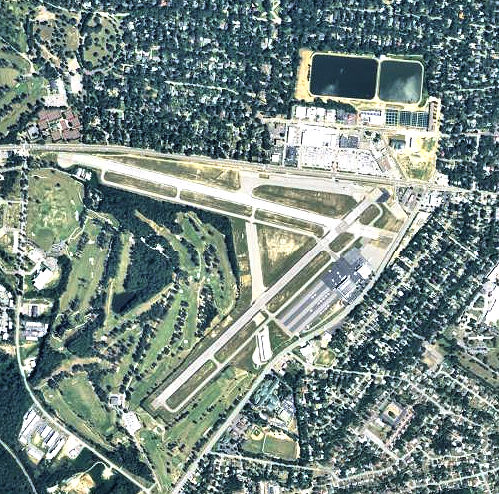
- 2006 USGS airphoto
- IATA: DNL; ICAO: KDNL; FAA LID: DNL

Summary
- Airport type: Public
- Owner: Augusta-Richmond County
- Serves: Augusta, Georgia
- Elevation AMSL: 423 ft (129 m)
- Coordinates: 33°27′59″N 082°02′22″W
- Website: www.augustaga.gov/...

Map
- Location of airport in Georgia, United States DNL (the United States)

Runways
Direction	Length		Surface
Direction	ft	m	Surface
5/23	4,002	1,220	Asphalt
11/29	3,733	1,138	Asphalt

Statistics
- Aircraft operations (2019): 30,000
- Based aircraft (2021): 52
- Source: Federal Aviation Administration

Daniel Field (IATA: DNL, ICAO: KDNL, FAA LID: DNL) is a public use airport located one nautical mile (2 km) west of the central business district of Augusta, a city in Richmond County, Georgia, United States. It is owned by the City of Augusta and operated by the General Aviation Commission. This airport is included in the National Plan of Integrated Airport Systems for 2021–2025, which categorized it as a general aviation facility.

== History ==
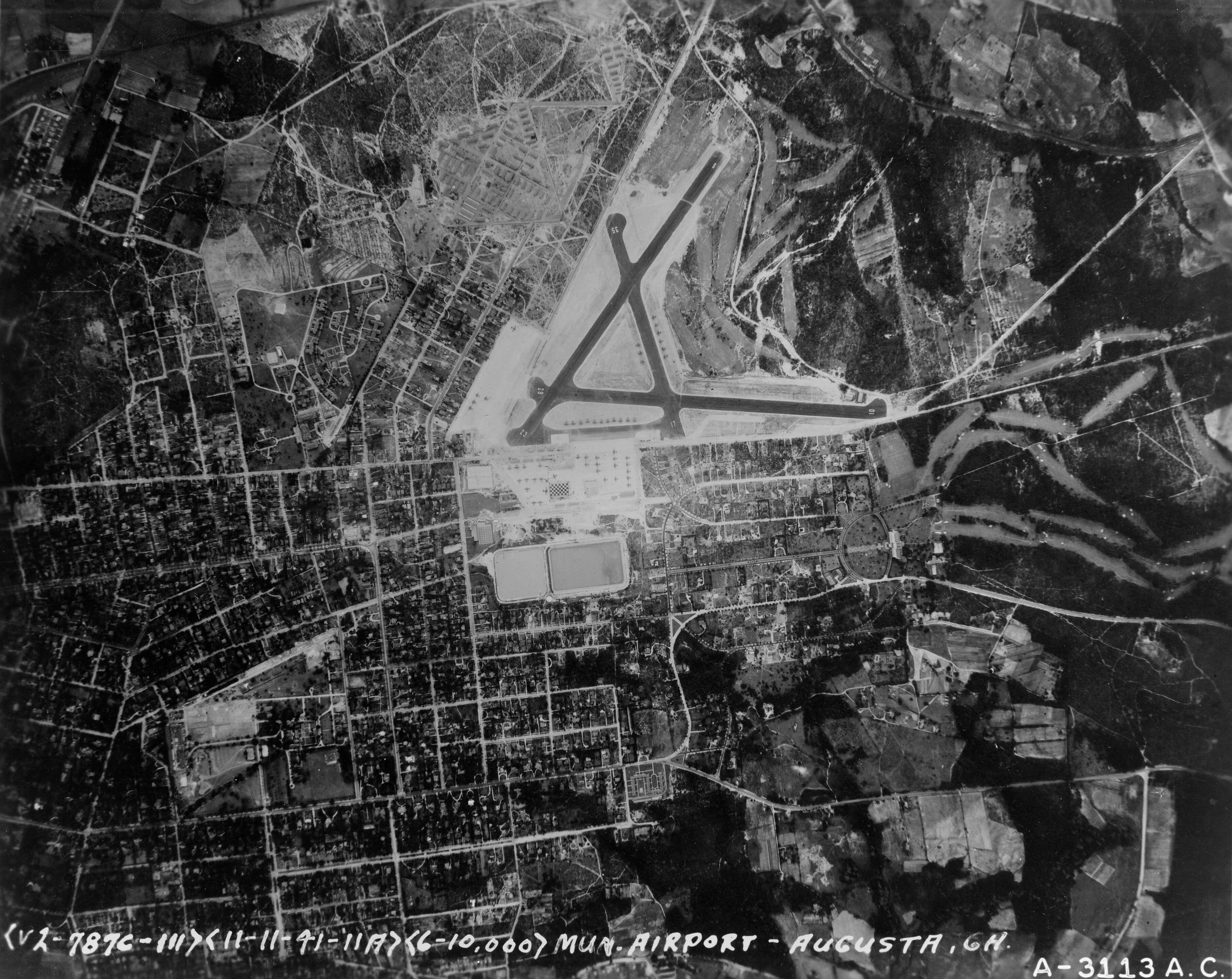
Construction of the airport

=== Origins ===
The origins of Daniel Field begin in 1924, when the City of Augusta leased 302 acres (1.22 km^{2}) for an airport and a municipal golf course. About 35,000 people attended the airport's dedication on October 29, 1927. Against the mayor's wishes, the city council named the airport Daniel Field, for mayor Raleigh Daniel, who was a major proponent of the city leasing the land in the early 1920s.

On December 1, 1931, Eastern Air Transport began passenger service, but discontinued it five months later due to unprofitability. Eastern resumed service in November 1932 after obtaining a mail contract. The same year, Delta Air Lines began serving Atlanta and Charleston, South Carolina from Augusta. In 1938, the Works Progress Administration began a project that added paved runways, drainage, and other improvements.

=== World War II ===
Alarmed by the fall of France in 1940, Congress funded an increase in the strength of the United States Army Air Corps from 29 to 54 combat groups and increased pilot training to 7,000 per year. The quickest way for the Air Corps to obtain additional bases was to utilize existing civil airports. On September 21, 1940, the Air Corps announced a $1.5 million project to build facilities at Daniel Field to support 100 to 110 pursuit aircraft and 2000 men. Because of technicalities in the land transfer, construction did not begin until March 1941. Once begun, a large construction program was needed to turn the civil airport into a military airfield. Construction involved runways and airplane hangars, with three concrete runways, several taxiways and a large parking apron and a control tower. Several large hangars were also constructed. Buildings were ultimately utilitarian and quickly assembled. Most base buildings, not meant for long-term use, were constructed of temporary or semi-permanent materials. Although some hangars had steel frames and the occasional brick or tile brick building could be seen, most support buildings sat on concrete foundations but were of frame construction clad in little more than plywood and tarpaper

Although the Army initially planned on using Daniel for fighter aircraft, it was utilized instead mostly by transport and observation squadrons. This was due to the fact that Daniel's longest runway was a relatively short 4,200 ft (1,300 m). The geographical restrictions of ravines to the west and the city of Augusta to the east made the extension of the runways impractical.

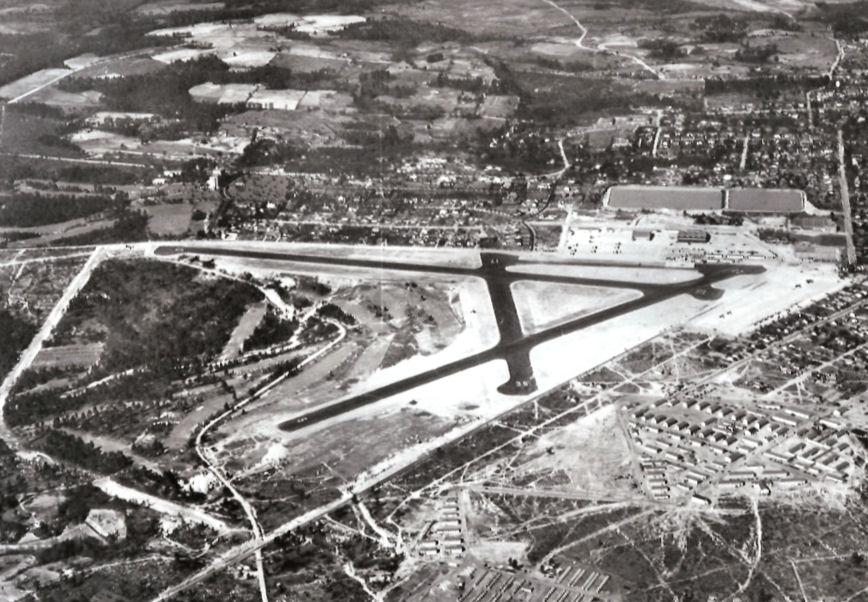
Oblique airphoto of Daniel Field, about 1944, looking northwest

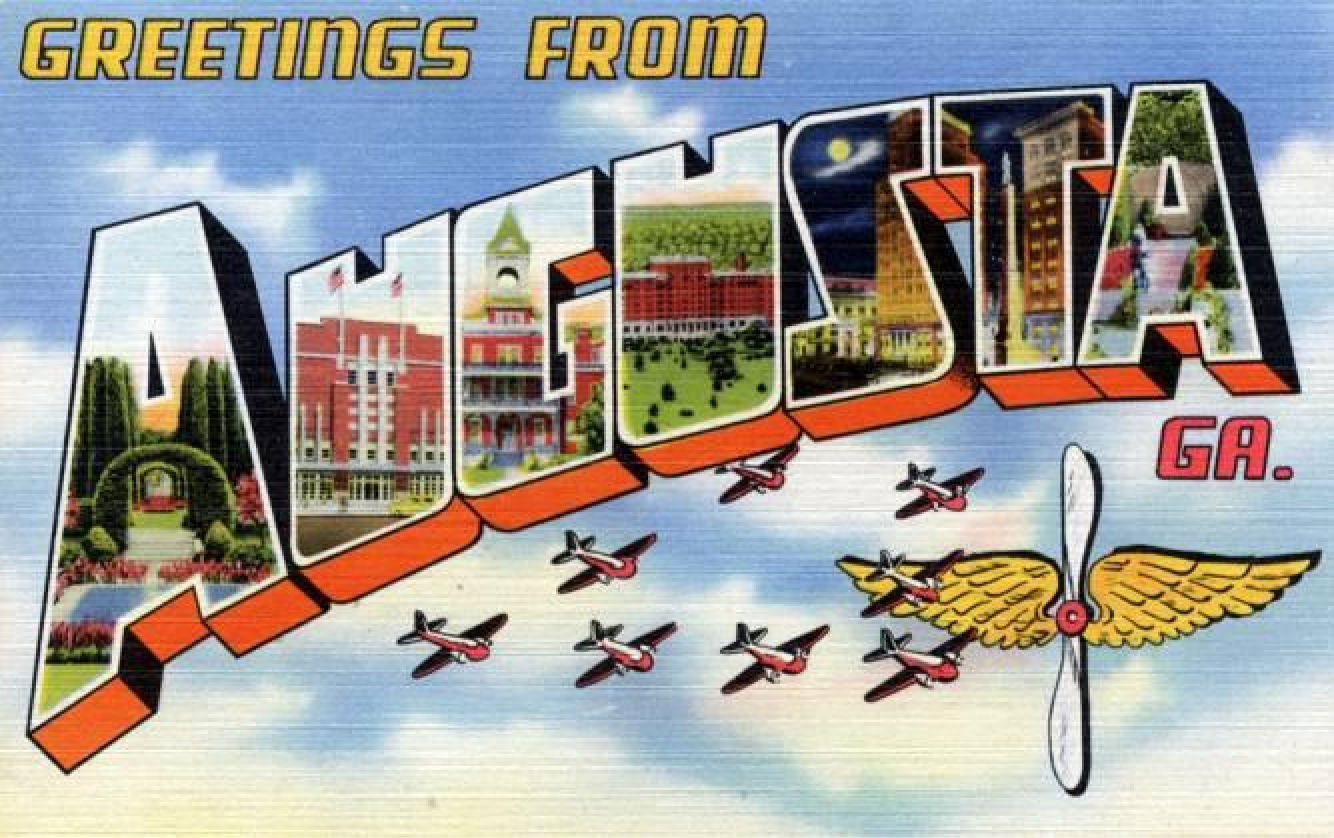
Postcard - Daniel Field Augusta Georgia

Initially assigned to the Army Air Corps Southeast Air District, the first units at Daniel Army Airfield the 14th and 15th Transport Squadrons of the 61st Transport Group arrived on July 12, 1941 from Kelly Field, near San Antonio, Texas. The 61st's group headquarters was formed at Olmsted Field, near Harrisburg, Pennsylvania. The squadrons flew C-47 Skytrains, as well as Douglas C-39s, which was the Air Corp's version of the Douglas DC-2. After organizational training and flying a few paratroop operations, the 61st and its squadrons were sent to Lubbock Field in Texas.

During the week of October 20, Daniel Field hosted the 40th Pursuit Squadron which came to Daniel Field from Selfridge Field, Michigan, which took part in III Interceptor Command exercises, flying P-39 Airacobras

With the United States at war in 1942, activity at the airfield expanded dramatically. In early February. Five transport squadrons of the Air Force Combat Command 89th Transport Group, the 24th, 25th, 26th, 27th, and 28th were activated at Daniel AAF. These squadrons were equipped with C-47s and Douglas DC-3s pressed into military service from the airlines. The 89th stay at Daniel was a short one. Only five weeks later the group moved on to Air Technical Service Command depot at Harding AAF, near Baton Rouge, Louisiana.

Also during February, three observation squadrons, the 16th, 111th, 122nd, and 154th, arrived from various other bases and forming the Third Air Force 68th Observation Group. Pilots trained on Douglas O-43A, Vultee/Stinson O-49/L-1 Vigilant and Douglas A-20B Havoc aircraft performing antisubmarine patrols along the South Carolina and Georgia coast.

On March 2, 1942, the III Air Support Command 313th Transport Group TG and the 29th Transport Squadron were activated at Daniel Field with C-47s. In May, the first tenants of Daniel, the 14th and 15th Transport Squadrons were reassigned to Pope Field, North Carolina to support the 82d Airborne Division at Fort Bragg. On June 15, the 313th Transport Group, activated three additional squadrons, the 47th, 48th, and 49th, out of the 29th TS. One week later, the 313th and its squadrons moved to Bowman Field, near Louisville, Kentucky to support the 101st Airborne at Fort Campbell. During July the observation squadrons all transferred to Smith Reynolds Airport, near Winston-Salem, North Carolina for antisubmarine duty.

In 1942, newly built Army Airfields were becoming available in the southeast and the Air Force no longer had the need for Daniel Field and its short runways. No other operational units were stationed at Daniel after August 1942. In February 1943, Daniel was reassigned to the Air Technical Service Command, being under the control of the Warner-Robins Air Depot Control Area. The facilities became a repair and replacement depot for Third Air Force aircraft. Most of the military flying at Daniel was by transient aircraft undergoing 3d and 4th echelon heavy maintenance work.

Daniel also activated and trained 32 chemical warfare companies. Chemical companies were equipped and taught to use smoke pots, tear gas, chemical trailers, trucks, blasting caps, and how to fill aircraft spray tanks. During the last part of the war, Daniel was used to prepare vehicles for use in the planned Invasion of Japan. In addition, the field had a branch prisoner of war camp with about 1200 POWs working on the field and in the nearby forests.

By war's end, the Army's air operations at Daniel were discontinued, with the airfield being returned to full civil control on October 31, 1945.

=== Postwar use ===
Throughout the war, Delta Air Lines served the airport with commercial airline service. With the closure of the Air Force's facilities, Daniel Field continued as Augusta's municipal airport. Eastern Air Lines resumed service to Augusta in 1948, later joined by Piedmont Airlines. On July 1, 1950, the airlines shifted their operations to Bush Field and Daniel became a general aviation airport.

In 1955, the City moved the two hangars to the eastern side of the airfield. A shopping center was then built on the former ramp area. Today, the only evidence of the Air Force's presence are two hangars. The former cantonment area is now a housing development.

== Facilities and aircraft ==
Daniel Field covers an area of 146 acres (59 ha) at an elevation of 423 feet (129 m) above mean sea level. It has two asphalt paved runways: 5/23 is 4,002 by 100 feet (1,220 × 30 m) and 11/29 is 3,733 by 100 feet (1,138 × 30 m). The remnants of a third runway oriented north-south are clearly visible but have been closed and are marked with yellow Xs or converted to taxiway use.

Notably, Daniel Field is some 279 feet (85 m) higher in elevation than the commercial Augusta airport, Augusta Regional Airport, as Daniel Field lies above the Piedmont – Coastal Plain fall line which descends steeply just south of Daniel Field. Augusta Regional Airport lies along the broad Savannah River floodplain.

Daniel Field has two large, fully enclosed hangars and a smaller open shelter. Augusta Aviation is the fixed-base operator (FBO) on the field, offering fuel, parking, hangars, flight instruction, charters, and aircraft repair.

For the 12-month period ending December 31, 2019, the airport had 30,000 general aviation aircraft operations, an average of 82 per day. In September 2021, there were 52 aircraft based at this airport: 44 single-engine, 7 multi-engine and 1 jet.

== Airlines ==
Daniel Field does not have regularly scheduled Part 121 Air Carrier service. Augusta Aviation, an on-field FBO, offers charter services as do other local and regional providers.

== Incidents ==
Daniel Field is located 6.9 nautical miles (12.8 km) northwest of Augusta’s commercial airport, Augusta Regional Airport. On the night of February 3, 1986, a Boeing 737-201/Advanced airliner operated by Piedmont Airlines landed on a 3,877 feet (1,182 m) long Daniel Field runway instead of much longer runway at Augusta Regional Airport as intended. After skidding to a stop still on the runway, the crew and all 106 passengers were unharmed. Augusta Chronicle photos at the time showed passengers disembarking the aircraft at Daniel Field down a Piedmont truck-mounted air stair. An Augusta Chronicle photo appears to identify the aircraft involved as N772N "Peninsula Pacemaker". Local lore often recounts the flight as being operated by Delta Air Lines and includes stories of the interior being stripped and a special test flight crew being used to fly the aircraft out, though contemporary accounts recorded otherwise.

== See also ==
- Air Technical Service Command
- Boshears Skyfest
- Georgia World War II Army Airfields
- List of airports in Georgia (U.S. state)

== Other sources ==
- Shettle, M. L. (2005), Georgia's Army Airfields of World War II. ISBN 0-9643388-3-1
- Maurer, Maurer (1983). Air Force Combat Units Of World War II. Maxwell AFB, Alabama: Office of Air Force History. ISBN 0-89201-092-4.
- Maurer, Maurer (1969), Combat Squadrons of the Air Force, World War II, Air Force Historical Studies Office, Maxwell AFB, Alabama. ISBN 0-89201-097-5
