= 313th Air Expeditionary Wing =

313th Air Expeditionary Wing

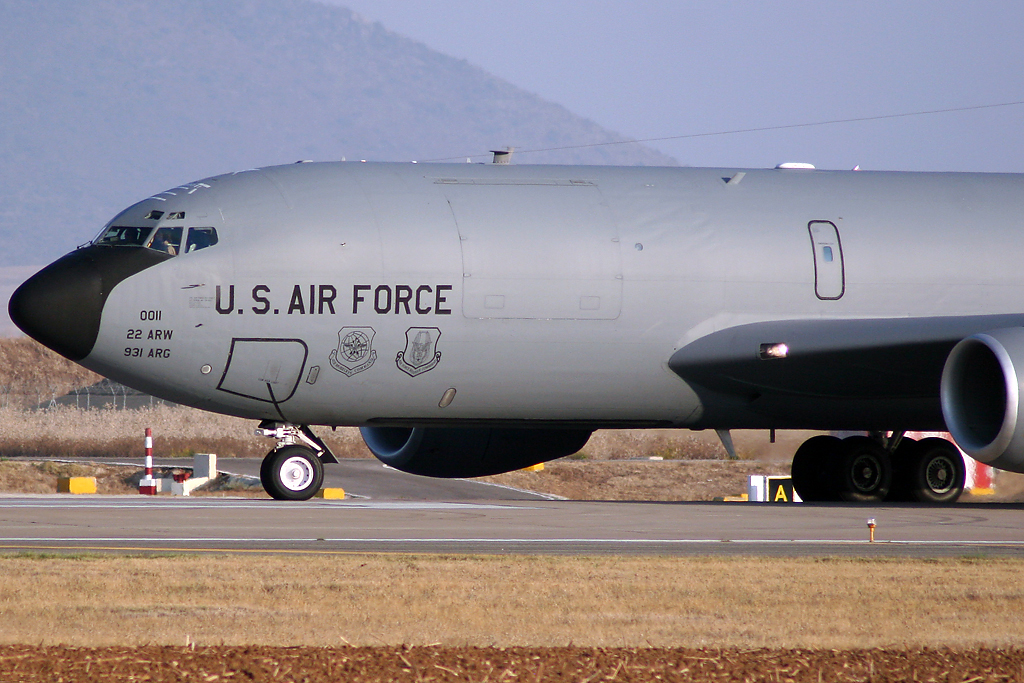
- KC-135 Stratotanker deployed to Moron AB in 2011
- Active: 1947–1948; 1948–1949; 1953; 1964–1973; 2011
- Country: United States
- Branch: United States Air Force
- Role: Control of expeditionary units
- Part of: United States Air Forces in Europe
- Nickname: Calico Wing (2011)
- Decorations: Air Force Outstanding Unit Award

Insignia
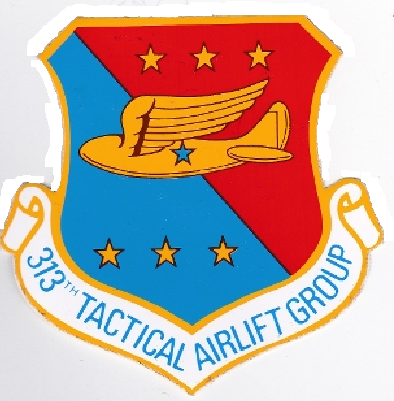
- 313th Air Expeditionary Wing emblem (Note: Approved 18 June 1953. The emblem was approved on a differently shaped shield on 3 February 1943 for the 313th Troop Carrier Group. Maurer, Combat Units, pp. 188–190. It was adopted by the wing in 1953.)

The 313th Air Expeditionary Wing is a provisional unit assigned to United States Air Forces in Europe. It was last active with the United States Air Forces Africa, Seventeenth Air Force at Moron Air Base, Spain.

== History ==
=== Organization and Berlin Airlift ===
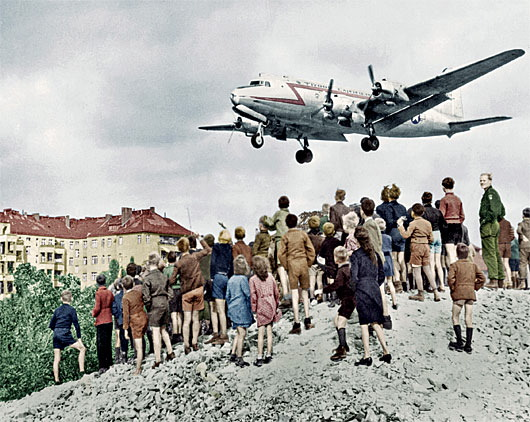
C-54 landing at Tempelhof Central Airport in 1948.

The wing was first organized as the 313th Troop Carrier Wing at Bergstrom Field, Texas in July 1947, shortly after the arrival of its tactical element, the 313th Troop Carrier Group. The wing was created under the experimental wing base organization system, in which tactical and support organizations were brought together under a single wing. In August 1948, this organization was made permanent. The wing trained with Fairchild C-82 Packets and gliders at Bergstrom.

In July 1948, group deployed its 48th Troop Carrier Squadron to Rhein-Main Air Base to reinforce United States Air Forces in Europe in the Berlin Airlift. As winter approached and the demand for supplies increased, the wing and its operational units moved to RAF Fassberg, Germany, and began to operate Douglas C-54 Skymasters, with which it flew food, medicine and coal into Berlin. The wing's support elements did not join it at Fassberg, but instead deployed to RAF Burtonwood, England, where a major inspection and repair facility was managed by the United Kingdom Air Materiel Area's 59th Air Depot Wing to support the airlift. The wing drew its support from elements of the 513th Troop Carrier Wing, which were located at Fassberg. In January 1949, the 313th Wing was inactivated and its 313th Troop Carrier Group was assigned directly to the 1st Airlift Task Force, but attached to the 60th Troop Carrier Wing, which moved to Fassburg from Rhein Main.

=== Tactical Air Command ===
The wing was activated at Mitchel Air Force Base, New York on 1 February 1953, when it replaced the 514th Troop Carrier Wing, a reserve unit that had been mobilized for the Korean War. The 514th was in the process of converting from Curtiss C-46 Commandos to Fairchild C-119 Flying Boxcars, and the 313th took over its personnel and equipment. Meanwhile, Tactical Air Command (TAC) was preparing the 465th Troop Carrier Group at Donaldson Air Force Base, South Carolina for deployment to France, but no wing headquarters or assigned support units were at Donaldson for the 465th Group. (Note: While training at Donaldson, the 465th Troop Carrier Group was attached to the 64th Troop Carrier Wing. Ravenstein, p. 102.) In August 1953, TAC inactivated the 313th Wing at Mitchel and replaced it and its support units with the 465th Troop Carrier Wing. The 313th Troop Carrier Group was reassigned directly to Eighteenth Air Force, but was attached to the new wing for the remainder of its stay at Mitchel.

In October 1964, the wing was activated at Forbes Air Force Base, Kansas. It was equipped with the Lockheed C-130 Hercules and organized under the dual deputy system, with its operational and maintenance squadrons assigned directly to wing headquarters. At Forbes, the wing trained in theater airlift operations and frequently deployed its squadrons to overseas locations to support contingency or rotational requirements. It was reduced to two operational squadrons in December 1965, when its 29th Troop Carrier Squadron deployed to the Pacific to support the Vietnam War and was reassigned the following month. In May 1967, along with all other TAC troop carrier units, the wing changed its name and became the 313th Tactical Airlift Wing. The wing was reduced to a single operational squadron, the 47th Tactical Airlift Squadron a month later, when the 48th Tactical Airlift Squadron was inactivated.

In June 1969, the wing assumed host responsibilities for Forbes from the 838th Air Division. The following month, it returned to two operational squadrons when the 38th Tactical Airlift Squadron moved to Forbes from Langley Air Force Base, Virginia. The 38th returned to Langley on paper in November 1971 and the 48th Squadron was reactivated, assuming its personnel and equipment. In 1973, the wing began to wind down its operations in preparation for the transfer of Forbes to the Kansas Air National Guard. The 29th Squadron moved to Dyess Air Force Base, Texas in July and the 48th to Little Rock Air Force Base, Arkansas in August. After their departure the wing concentrated on actions to close Forbes until it was inactivated on 30 September.

=== Expeditionary operations ===
The wing was converted to provisional status as the 313th Air Expeditionary Wing. It was activated on 30 March 2011 at Moron Air Base, Spain to support Operation Odyssey Dawn, a mission to enforce a no-fly zone put in place to protect the civilian population of Libya. The task of assembling the wing initially fell to the 171st Air Refueling Wing of the Pennsylvania Air National Guard, starting with two tankers that were already at Moron to support planes rotating to and from the Middle East. The first four tankers of the 171st arrived on the morning of 20 March. By the following day, the yet-to-be formally designated wing had grown to a mix of fifteen Boeing KC-135 Stratotankers and four McDonnell Douglas KC-10 Extenders, drawn from 14 different wings of the regular force, Air Force Reserve Command, and the Air National Guard. Looking at the mix of tail stripes on the planes he commanded, Brigadier General Uptegraff dubbed his unit the "Calico Wing."

Because Congress had not approved the mission, much of the wing's manning was on a volunteer bases, with funding drawn from money budgeted for other purposes. While operational control of the wing was assigned to United States Air Forces in Europe (USAFE)'s Seventeenth Air Force, deficiencies in manning and experience with air mobility operations led to a combined control between USAFE (for tactical control) and Air Mobility Command (AMC). On 31 March, control of Odyssey Dawn was assumed by NATO, which named it Operation Unified Protector. On the same day, the confused command situation was emphasised when simultaneous orders from USAFE and AMC designated Uptegraff's wing both the 406th Air Expeditionary Wing (USAFE), and the 313th Wing (AMC). Later accounts emphasize that Uptegraff focused on making sure operations continued, and that the 406th AEW only existed briefly. By late August, the wing had flown more than 2200 sorties and offloaded over 110,000,000 pounds of fuel to aircraft flying Unified Protector missions. The wing was inactivated when Unified Protector operations ended in October 2011.

== Lineage ==
- Established as the 313th Troop Carrier Wing on 28 July 1947

Organized on 15 August 1947
Discontinued on 26 August 1948

- Established as the 313th Troop Carrier Wing, Heavy (Note: Ravenstein treats this as a redesignation because it was only a change from the test organization to a permanent organization. The test and permanent wings were formally consolidated in 1984.)

Activated on 23 August 1948
Inactivated on 20 January 1949

- Redesignated 313th Troop Carrier Wing, Medium on 26 November 1952

Activated on 1 February 1953
Inactivated on 25 August 1953

- Activated on 15 June 1964 (not organized)

Organized on 1 October 1964
Redesignated 313th Tactical Airlift Wing on 1 May 1967
Inactivated on 30 September 1973

- Converted to provisional status and redesignated 313th Air Expeditionary Wing on 12 June 2002

Activated on 30 March 2011
Inactivated on 31 October 2011

=== Assignments ===
- Ninth Air Force, 15 August 1947 – 26 August 1948
- Ninth Air Force, 23 August 1948
- Tactical Air Command, 25 October 1948
- United States Air Forces in Europe, 5 November 1948 (attached to 1st Airlift Task Force after 9 November 1948)
- 1st Air Lift Task Force, 18 November 1948 – 20 January 1949
- Eighteenth Air Force, 1 February-25 August 1953
- Tactical Air Command, 15 June 1964 (not organized)
- 839th Air Division, 1 October 1964
- 838th Air Division, 9 November 1964
- Twelfth Air Force, 24 December 1969
- 834th Air Division, 15 March 1972 – 30 September 1973
- Air Mobility Command to activate or inactivate as needed on 12 June 2002

attached to Seventeenth Air Force, 19 March–31 October 2011

=== Stations ===
- Bergstrom Field (later Bergstrom Air Force Base), Texas, 15 August 1947 – 22 October 1948
- RAF Fassberg, Germany, 9 November 1948 – 20 January 1949
- Mitchel Air Force Base, New York, 1 February–25 August 1953
- Forbes Air Force Base, Kansas, 1 October 1964 – 30 September 1973
- Moron Air Base, Spain, 19 March–31 October 2011

=== Components ===
Groups

- 313th Airdrome Group (later 313th Air Base Group, 313th Combat Support Group): 15 August 1947 – 26 August 1948, 23 August 1948 – 17 January 1949 (attached to 59th Air Depot Wing, October 1948, United Kingdom Air Materiel Area after November 1948), 1 February-25 August 1953, 8 June 1969 – 30 September 1973
- 313th Maintenance & Supply Group (later 313th Expeditionary Maintenance Group): 15 August 1947 – 26 August 1948, 23 August 1948 – 17 January 1949 (attached to 59th Air Depot Wing, October 1948, United Kingdom Air Materiel Area after November 1948), 1 February-25 August 1953, 19 March–31 October 2011
- 313th Station Medical Group (later 313th Medical Group, 313th Tactical Hospital): 15 August 1947 – 26 August 1948, 23 August 1948 – October 1948, 1 February-25 August 1953, 8 June 1969 – 30 September 1973
- 313th Troop Carrier Group (later 313th Expeditionary Operations Group): 15 August 1947 – 26 August 1948, 23 August 1948 – 20 January 1949, 1 February-25 August 1953, 19 March–31 October 2011

Squadrons

- 29th Tactical Airlift Squadron: 1 October 1964 – 27 January 1966
- 38th Tactical Airlift Squadron: 1 July 1969 – 15 November 1971 (not operational, 1 July-31 December 1969; detached 4 November 1970-12 January 1971 and 9 September-15 November 1971)
- 47th Tactical Airlift Squadron: 1 October 1964 – 6 July 1973 (detached 26 July-19 November 1965, 25 January—c. 23 June 1966, 2 September— c. November 1966, c. January-25 March 1967, 27 September-4 December 1969, 16 February-19 March 1970, 5 June-11 August 1970, 3 May-12 July 1971, 6 December 1971 – 14 February 1972, 3 August-20 October 1972, 31 December 1972 – 11 February 1973)
- 48th Tactical Airlift Squadron: 1 January 1965 – 25 June 1967 (detached c. 17 November 1965 – c. 28 January 1966, 23 June – September 1966, c. November 1966 – c. January 1967); 15 November 1971 – 6 August 1973 (detached 3 April – 28 June 1972 and 3 October – 30 December 1972).
- 313th Avionics Maintenance Squadron: 1 April 1972 – 30 September 1973
- 313th Field Maintenance Squadron: 1 October 1964 – 30 September 1973
- 313th Organizational Maintenance Squadron: 1 October 1964 – 1 October 1966, 1 April 1972 – 30 September 1973

Other

- 313th Tactical Hospital: (see 313th Station Medical Group)
- USAF Hospital, Forbes: 24 May 1971 – 30 September 1973

=== Aircraft ===
- Douglas C-47 Skytrain 1947–1948
- Douglas C-54 Skymaster, 1948–1949
- Fairchild C-82 Packet, 1947–1949
- Curtiss C-46 Commando, 1953
- Fairchild C-119 Flying Boxcar, 1953
- Lockheed C-130 Hercules, 1964–1973
- Boeing KC-135 Stratotanker
- McDonnell Douglas KC-10 Extender

== See also ==
- United Nations Security Council Resolution 1973
