= RAF Folkingham =

Former Royal Air Force station in Lincolnshire, England

RAF Folkingham USAAF Station AAF-484
- Folkingham, Lincolnshire in England
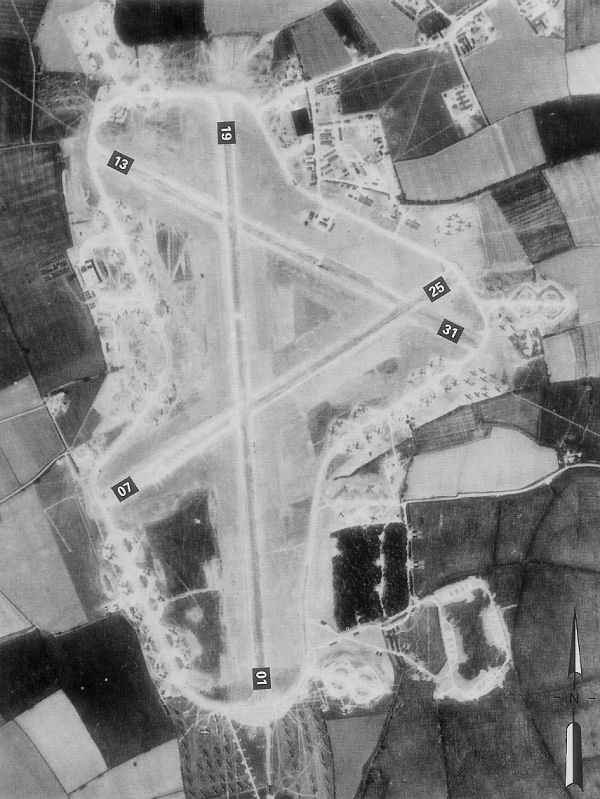
- 9 May 1944 with scores of gliders and C-47s about a month before D-Day.

Site information
- Type: Royal Air Force station
- Owner: Ministry of Defence
- Operator: Royal Air Force; United States Army Air Forces
- Controlled by: RAF Bomber Command; Ninth Air Force

Location
- Shown within Lincolnshire RAF Folkingham (the United Kingdom)
- Coordinates: 52°51′29″N 000°26′34″W

Site history
- Built: 1943
- In use: 1943-1947,1959-1963
- Battles/wars: European theatre of World War II; Cold War

Airfield information
- Elevation: 81 metres (266 ft) AMSL
Runways
Direction	Length and surface
02/20	1,828 metres (5,997 ft) Asphalt
08/24	1,280 metres (4,199 ft) Asphalt
14/32	1,280 metres (4,199 ft) Asphalt

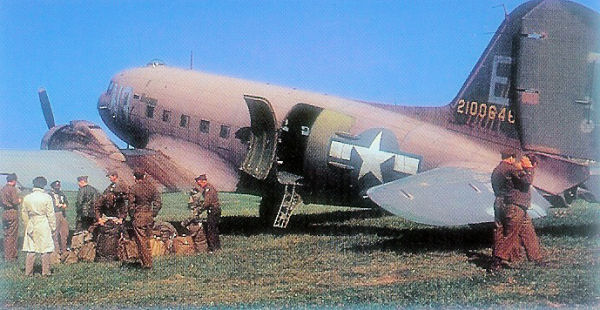
47th TCS Douglas C-47A-70-DL Skytrain Serial 42–100646. This aircraft is still airworthy and is flown by the Dutch Dakota Association.

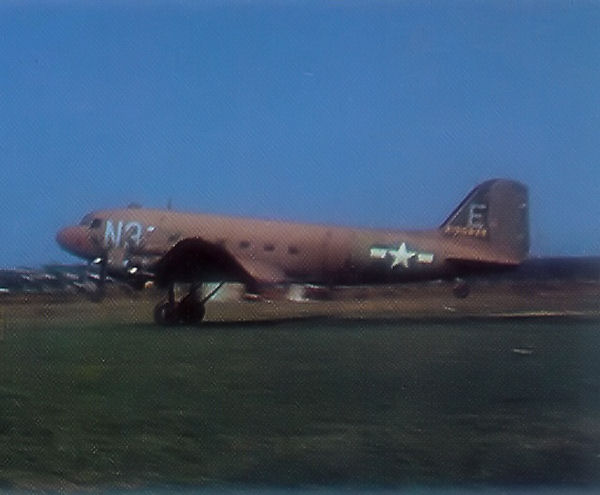
47th TCS C-47Douglas C-47A-70-DL Skytrain Serial 42-100646 taking off.

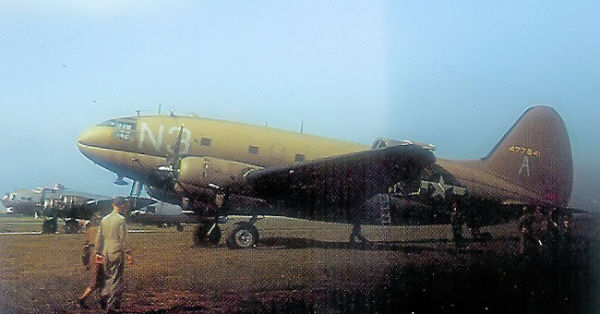
47th TCS Curtiss C-46D-10-CU Commando Serial 44–77541.

Royal Air Force Folkingham or RAF Folkingham is a former Royal Air Force station located south west of Folkingham, Lincolnshire and about 29 miles (47 km) due south of county town Lincoln.

Opened in 1940, it was used by both the Royal Air Force and United States Army Air Forces. During the war, it was used primarily as a troop carrier airfield for airborne units and as a subsidiary training depot of the newly formed Royal Air Force Regiment. After the war, it was placed on care and maintenance during 1947 when the RAF Regiment relocated to RAF Catterick.

During the late 1950s and early 1960s, the RAF Bomber Command used Folkingham as a PGM-17 Thor Intermediate Range Ballistic Missile (IRBM) base.

Today the remains of the airfield are located on private property being used as agricultural fields, with the main north–south runway acting as hardstanding for hundreds of scrapped vehicles.

== History ==
=== USAAF ===
Folkingham was known as USAAF Station AAF-484 for security reasons by the USAAF during the war, and by which it was referred to instead of location. Its USAAF Station Code was "FK".

==== 313th Troop Carrier Group ====
US personnel started to arrive in January 1944 to prepare for the 313th Troop Carrier Group scheduled to transfer from Trapani/Milo Airfield, Sicily. On 5 February it opened as a USAAF IX Troop Carrier Command station flying four squadrons of Douglas C-47 Skytrains. Operational squadrons and fuselage codes were:

- 29th Troop Carrier Squadron (Z7)
- 47th Troop Carrier Squadron (N3)
- 48th Troop Carrier Squadron (5X)
- 49th Troop Carrier Squadron (H2)

The 313th TCG was part of the 52nd Troop Carrier Wing.

However, at the end of February 1945, the group began its move to a new base in France at Achiet (Advanced Landing Ground B-54), although the last elements did not leave until well into March.

==== RAF Maintenance Command ====
Folkingham was retained by the USAAF although most personnel had departed by mid-April. The station was closed in 1947.

=== British Racing Motors (BRM) ===
With the facility released from military control, the runway was used by British Racing Motors for development testing of the new BRM 16 cylinder 1.5 litre racing car, which was presented before the press for the first time on 15 December 1949 at Folkingham airfield. A BRM engine test house and other facilities were later built there.

=== Thor Missile use by RAF Bomber Command ===
RAF Folkingham later served as a post-war PGM-17 Thor Intermediate Range Ballistic Missile (IRBM) base with 3 IRBM launchers operated by No. 223 (Strategic Missile) Squadron RAF. With the reactivation of the site in late 1958, BRM was relocated to RAF North Witham.

On the closure of the Thor site, BRM moved back and its later cars were tested at Folkingham, but only remained for a few years. In the late 1960s, the runways and some Nissen huts were used by Lincolnshire Police as a driver training and skid pan area. In the mid-1960s the testing track closed and the airfield was sold off to agricultural interests.

== Current use ==
Today the airfield is largely used for agriculture. Most of the runways and perimeter track were removed after the sale of the airfield by BRM for hardcore aggregate, with some single-lane agricultural roads remaining that generally outlines the former concreted area. No evidence of the technical site located to the north-east of the airfield remains. Evidence of some dispersed personnel sites appear to the north and north-east of the airfield, with some concrete roads now in abandoned, overgrown areas.

The southern half of the airfield partially remains containing several single and double-loop handstands, along with a full-width length of the 18-36 north–south main runway. The runway now serves as a vehicle compound for Nelson M Green & Sons Ltd, for the storage of decommissioned agricultural vehicles, lorries and other equipment. The vehicles, many often rare and long out of production, are stored for the resale of their spare parts. The abandoned hulks also line the sides of the remaining perimeter track along with several of the old dispersal loops. The wartime bomb dump exists, although it is now a forested area still containing concrete disused bomb stores, evidence of which can be seen by the pattern of vegetation that has overgrown and reclaimed the facility.

The remains of the three post-war Thor missile pads are the most prominent military features remaining on the airfield, their heavily reinforced concrete areas making them difficult and uneconomical to remove for the small amount of aggregate that can be reclaimed from them.

== See also ==
- List of former Royal Air Force stations
- 82nd Airborne Division
