= 52nd Troop Carrier Wing =

52d Transport Wing 52d Troop Carrier Wing 52d Fighter Wing (NY ANG)
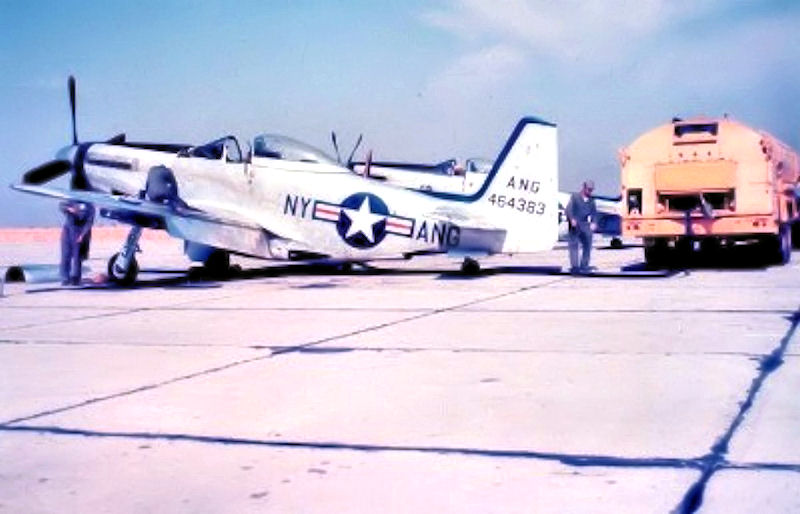
- 139th Fighter Squadron – North American F-51H Mustang 44-64383, Schenectady County Airport, New York
- Active: 1942–1946; 1946–1950
- Country: United States
- Branch: United States Air Force
- Type: Wing
- Role: Command and Control
- Engagements: American Theater of World War II; European Theater of World War II

Insignia
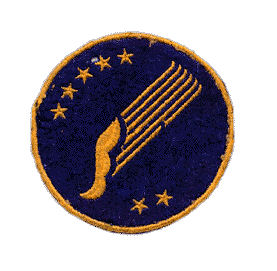
- 52d Troop Carrier Wing emblem

The 52nd Troop Carrier Wing (52 TCW) is a disbanded unit of the United States Air Force. It was last assigned to the New York Air National Guard (NY ANG) as the 52d Fighter Wing, being stationed at Westchester County Airport, New York. It was inactivated on 31 October 1950 and the unit designation withdrawn and returned to the Air Force by the National Guard Bureau. It was disbanded on 15 June 1983.

== History ==
=== World War II ===
The wing was established and activated as an airlift unit, the 52d Transport Wing on 15 June 1942. It was a major training organization for I Troop Carrier Command, from 1942 to 1943, training subordinate units in the United States prior to overseas deployment.

The wing deployed to North Africa in 1943 and was assigned to Twelfth Air Force. Its units subsequently engaged in combat operations, supporting Fifth Army units in the North African and Tunisian Campaigns. The wing's five groups also carried Army parachutists and towed gliders during Operation Husky. It provided supply transportation during the subsequent Italian Campaign during the balance of 1943

The wing was reassigned to Ninth Air Force and moved to England during February 1944. Its subordinate units began training for the invasion of continental Europe. This training involved airdropping paratroopers and towing gliders. Groups present for the invasion training were the 61st Troop Carrier Group, 313th Troop Carrier Group, 314th Troop Carrier Group, 315th Troop Carrier Group, 316th Troop Carrier Group, 349th Troop Carrier Group, and 434th Troop Carrier Group.

In June 1944, subordinate units of the wing dropped paratroopers in Normandy, subsequently flying numerous missions to bring in reinforcements and needed supplies. During the airborne attack on the Netherlands (Operation Market Garden), in September 1944, the 52nd dropped paratroops, towed gliders, and flew resupply missions. Several of its subordinate units also participated in the invasion of southern France in August 1944. The 52nd supported the 101st Airborne Division in the Battle of the Bulge by towing gliders full of supplies near Bastogne on 27 December 1944. In addition, its units participated in Operation Varsity, the air assault across the Rhine River in early 1945 and later flew numerous aerial resupply and casualty evacuation flights of wounded personnel as well as theater troop transport operations. It operated until V-E Day, then returned to the United States until inactivation in 1946.

=== New York Air National Guard ===
The wartime 52d Troop Carrier Wing was allotted to the New York Air National Guard, on 28 August 1946. It was re-designated as the 52d Fighter Wing and organized at Westchester County Airport, New York, being extended federal recognition on 3 October 1947 by the National Guard Bureau.

It was a command and control organization, controlling one bombardment group at Floyd Bennett Field, Brooklyn and a fighter group at Niagara Falls International Airport. The wing also controlled Air National Guard units in New Jersey and Delaware.

At the end of October 1950, the ANG converted to the wing-base (Hobson Plan) organization. As a result, the wing was inactivated on 31 October 1950 and the allocation was withdrawn from the New York ANG. The 106th Bombardment Wing at Brooklyn, and 107th Fighter Wing at Niagara Falls formed and were simultaneously allotted to the NY ANG and activated to replace the 52d, reporting directly to the New York National Guard Adjutant General in Albany.

The NY ANG 52d Fighter Wing should not be confused with the 52d Fighter Wing first activated in June 1948 and currently active.

=== Lineage ===
- Constituted as 52d Transport Wing on 30 May 1942

Activated on 15 June 1942
Redesignated 52d Troop Carrier Wing in July 1942
Inactivated on 27 August 1946.

- Redesignated 52d Fighter Wing. Allotted to ANG (NY) on 28 August 1946

Extended federal recognition on 3 October 1947
Inactivated and allotment to the Air National Guard withdrawn on 31 October 1950

- Disbanded on 15 June 1983

=== Assignments ===
- I Troop Carrier Command, 15 June 1942
- Twelfth Air Force, 8 May 1943
- XII Troop Carrier Command (Provisional), 15 December 1943
- IX Troop Carrier Command, 17 February 1944 – July 1945
- I Troop Carrier Command, July 1945 – 27 August 1946
- New York Air National Guard, 3 October 1947 – 31 October 1950

=== Components ===
==== World War II ====
- 10th Troop Carrier Group: 4 October 1942 – 13 February 1943
- 61st Troop Carrier Group: 6 August – 12 October 1942, 15 February 1943 – 7 May 1945
- 313th Troop Carrier Group: 4 February 1944 – 5 August 1945
- 314th Troop Carrier Group: 15 June – 30 August 1942; 20 February 1943 – 20 May 1945
- 315th Troop Carrier Group: 20 June – 29 November 1942; 18 February 1944 – 15 May 1945
- 316th Troop Carrier Group: 1942
- 349th Troop Carrier Group: 30 April – 20 May 1945; 31 January – 27 August 1946
- 433d Troop Carrier Group: February 1943 – 19 March 1943
- 434th Troop Carrier Group: 4 October 1945 – 5 February 1946
- 439th Troop Carrier Group: c. December 1945 – 21 March 1946

==== New York Air National Guard ====
- 106th Bombardment Group, 3 October 1947 – 31 October 1950
- 107th Fighter Group, 3 October 1947 – 31 October 1950
- 119th Fighter Squadron, 9 February 1947 – 26 May 1949

=== Stations ===
- Daniel Field, Georgia, 15 June 1942
- Bowman Field, Kentucky, 20 July 1942
- Pope Field, North Carolina, 3 August 1942 – 24 April 1943
- Oujda Airfield, French Morocco, 8 May 1943
- Kairouan Airfield, Tunisia, July 1943
- Agrigento Airfield, Sicily, 1 September 1943 – 13 February 1944
- RAF Cottesmore (AAF-489), England, 17 February 1944
- Amiens Glisy Airfield (B-48), France, 5 March – 20 June 1945
- Baer Field, Indiana, July 1945
- Kellogg Field, Michigan, August 1945
- Sedalia AAF, Missouri, 1 October 1945
- Bergstrom Field, Texas, 4 March – 27 August 1946
- Westchester County Airport, New York, 3 October 1947 – 31 October 1950
