= 50th Air Refueling Squadron =

US Air Force unit

50th Air Refueling Squadron

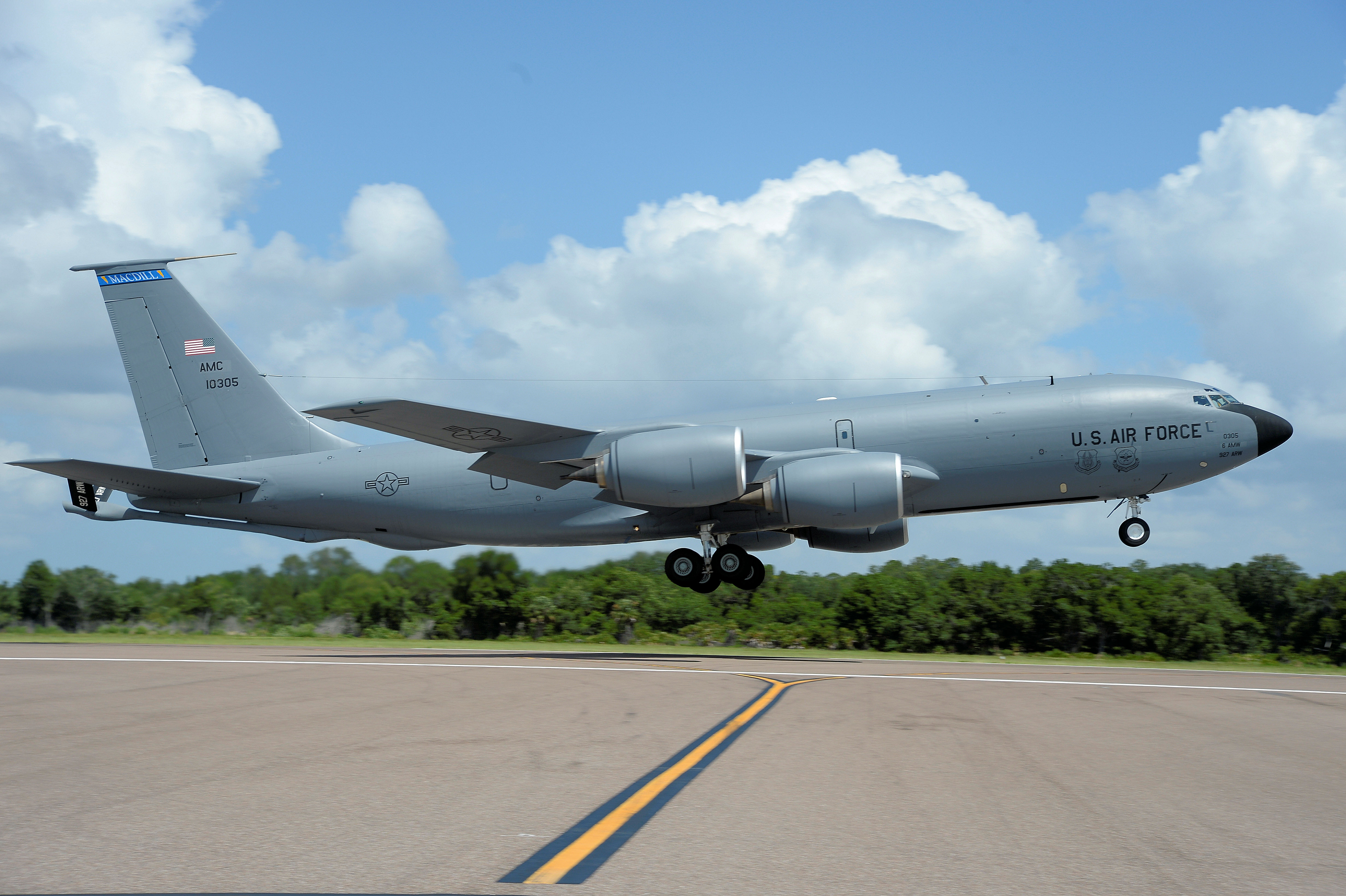
- Boeing KC-135 of the 6th Air Refueling Wing as flown by the 50th ARS
- Active: 1942–1946; 1949–2016; 2017–present
- Country: United States
- Branch: United States Air Force
- Role: Aerial refueling
- Part of: Air Mobility Command
- Garrison/HQ: MacDill Air Force Base
- Nicknames: Red Devils; Fightin' Five-O; America's 9-1-1 Squadron
- Mottos: Dans Illis Infernum Latin; Giving 'em Hell (2017-Present); Transportatem Certe in Caelo Latin; Air Transportation Assured (1994-2016)
- Engagements: European Theater of Operations; Mediterranean Theater of Operations; Korean War; Vietnam War; Operation Just Cause; Persian Gulf War; Operation Provide Promise; Operation Joint Endeavour; Operation Allied Force; Operation Shining Hope; Operation Joint Guard; Operation Joint Forge; Operation Enduring Freedom; Operation Iraqi Freedom; War in Afghanistan (2001–2021)
- Decorations: Distinguished Unit Citation; Air Force Outstanding Unit Award with Combat "V" Device; Air force Outstanding Unit Award; Philippine Presidential Unit Citation; Republic of Korea Presidential Unit Citation; Republic of Vietnam Gallantry Cross with Palm

Commanders
- Current commander: Lt. Col. Kenneth Burch

Insignia
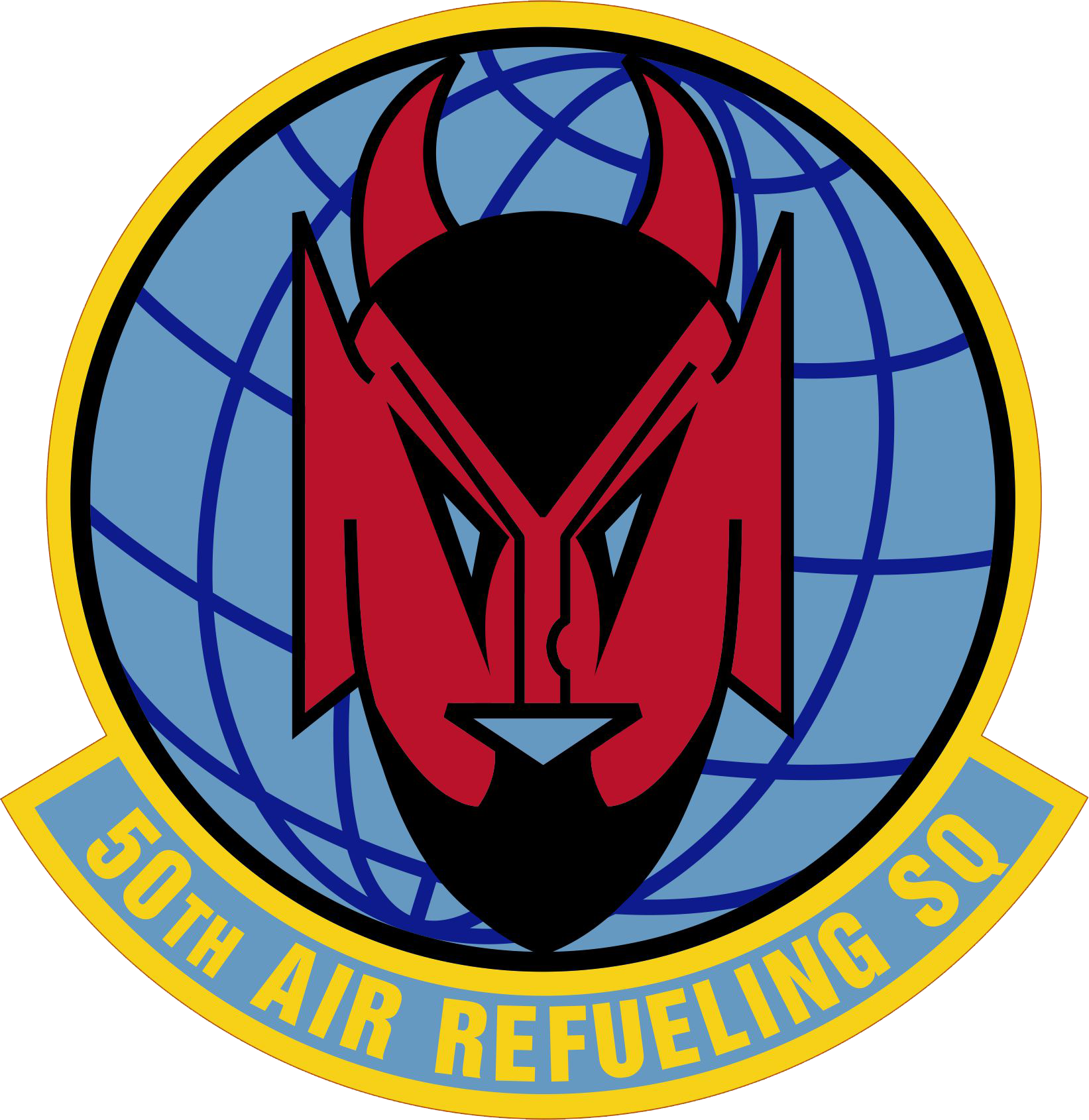
- 50th Air Refueling Squadron emblem (Modified, 2 Oct 2017)

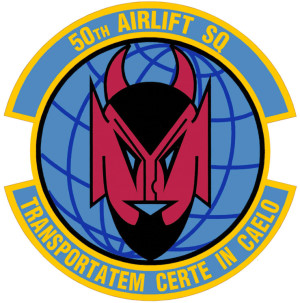
- 50th Airlift Squadron emblem (Modified, 12 Dec 1994)

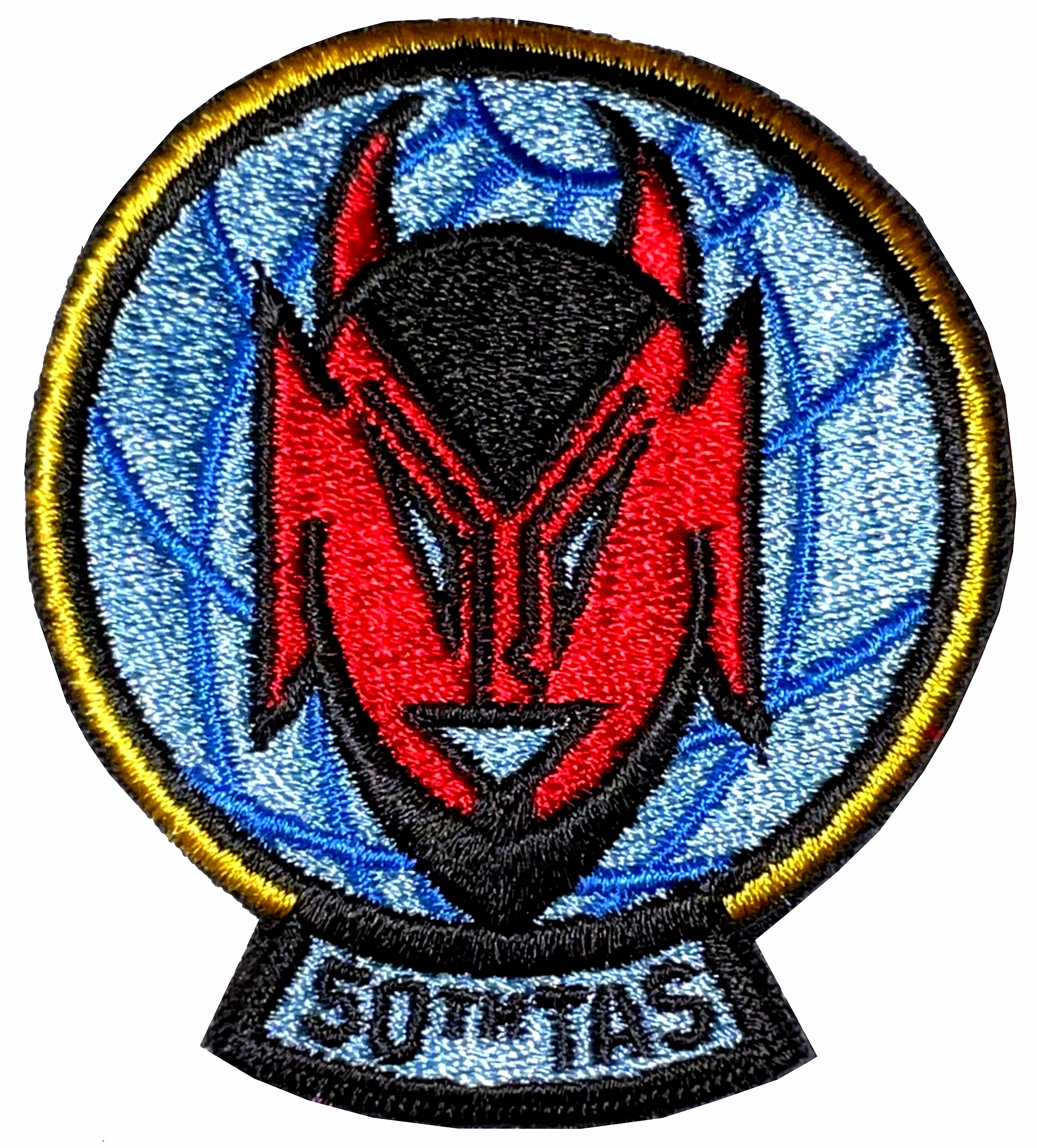
- 50th Tactical Airlift Squadron emblem (Note: Celeste, gridlined as a globe with axis bendwise sinister Azure, a stylized devil’s head couped affronte Gules with eyes and mouth of the first, garnished and fimbriated Sable; all within a diminished inner bordure of the last and outer bordure. (Approved, 1 Aug 1967) (Endicott, p. 579))

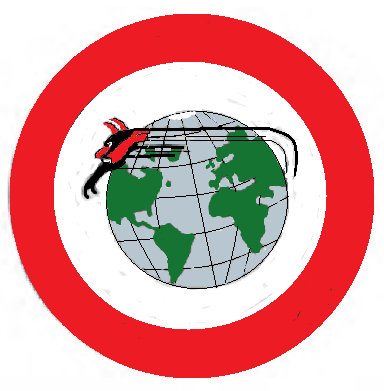
- 50th Troop Carrier Squadron, Medium emblem (Note: On a disc white, with wide border gules, a sphere silver-grey, land areas green, north polar region white, longitude and latitude lines and outline black, over the upper area of the sphere a devil's head in rapid motion, a trail from the head streaking around the sphere, all gules, eyeball of devil white, his claw, mouth, eye, and outline detail black. (Approved, 16 Apr 1957) (Maurer p. 217))

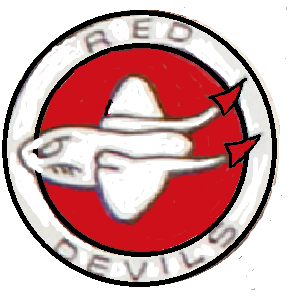
- 50th Troop Carrier Squadron, Medium emblem (Note: Approved, 13 Feb 1952.)

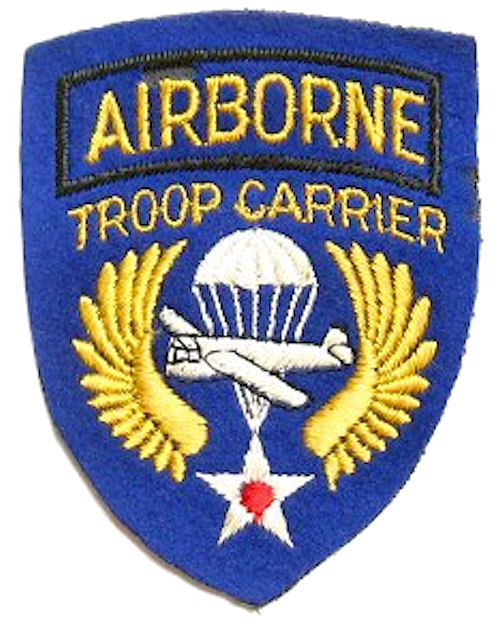
- 50th Troop Carrier Squadron emblem (D-Day WWII)

The 50th Air Refueling Squadron is a unit of the US Air Force, assigned to the 6th Operations Group, 6th Air Refueling Wing at MacDill Air Force Base, Florida. It operates the Boeing KC-135R Stratotanker aircraft, conducting air refueling missions.

It was a former legacy C-130 Hercules tactical airlift squadron that was inactivated in April 2016. The Fightin' Five-O, Red Devils were previously one of four operational flying Air Mobility Command squadrons stationed at Little Rock Air Force Base, Arkansas under the 19th Airlift Wing.

Transitioning to Aerial refueling mission in 2017, the 50th Air Refueling Squadron is now assigned to MacDill Air Force Base, Florida. They operate the KC-135R/T for the 6th Operations Group with the 91st Air Refueling Squadron and the 99th Air Refueling Squadron at Birmingham, for the Alabama Air National Guard.

== History ==
=== World War II ===
Activated in the summer of 1942 under I Troop Carrier Command and equipped with Douglas C-47 Skytrains at Drew Field, FL. Trained in various parts of the eastern United States until the end of 1943. Deployed to French Morocco in May 1943 and assigned to Twelfth Air Force to support combat operations in the North African Campaign. Remained with Twelfth Air Force, moving to Tunisia and Sicily providing transport and resupply operations as well as casualty evacuation of wounded personnel in the Mediterranean Theater of Operations (MTO). Reassigned to IX Troop Carrier Command in England during early 1944 as part of the build-up of Allied forces prior to Operation Overlord, the invasion of France.

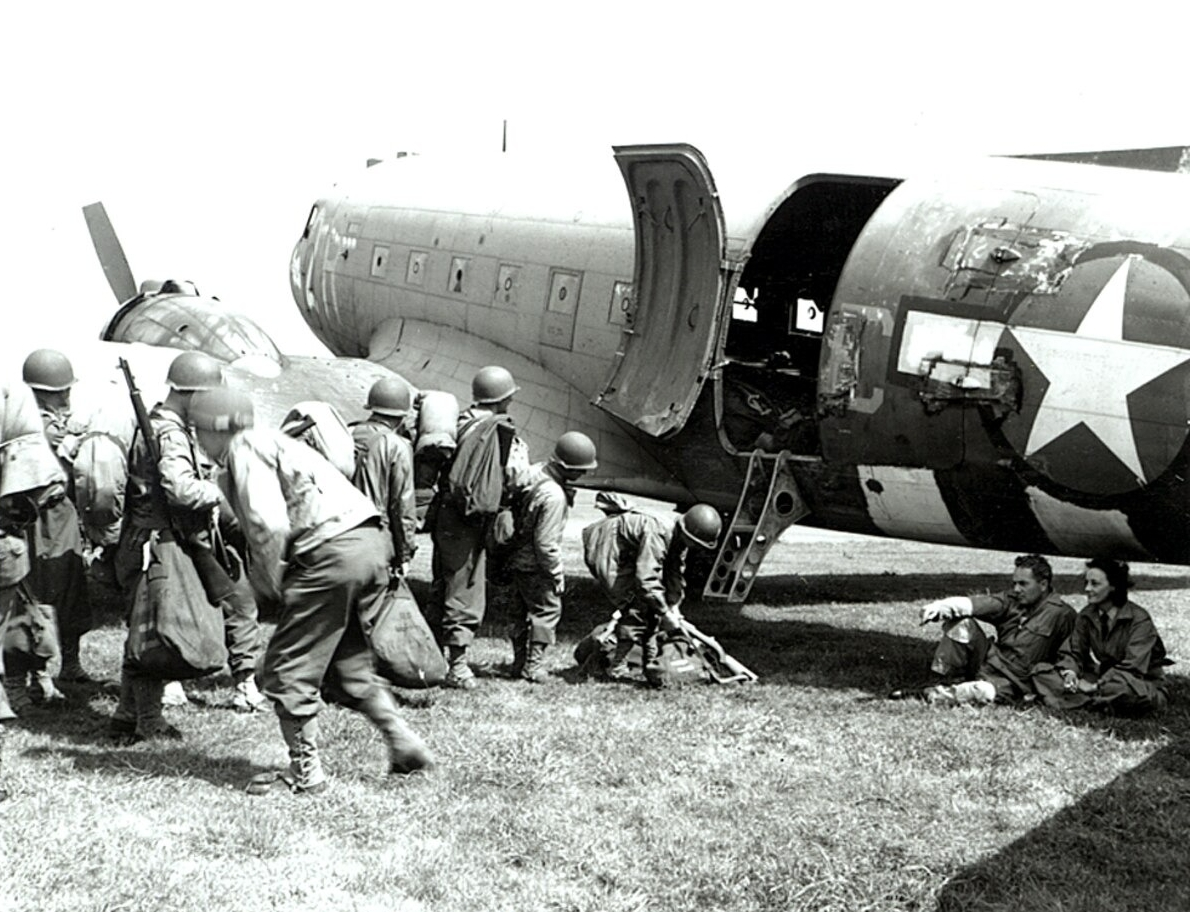
82nd Airborne Div. paratroopers prepare to board a 50th TCS assigned C-47 June 5, 1944

Began operations by dropping 82nd Airborne Division paratroops into Normandy on D-Day (6 June 1944) and releasing gliders with reinforcements on the following day. 50th TCS assigned C-47's during the D-Day operations utilized the 2R fuselage code. The unit received a Distinguished Unit Citation for these missions.

After the Normandy invasion the squadron ferried supplies in the United Kingdom. The squadron also hauled food, clothing, medicine, gasoline, ordnance equipment, and other supplies to the front lines and evacuated patients to rear zone hospitals. It dropped paratroops near Nijmegen and towed gliders carrying reinforcements during the Operation Market Garden, the airborne attack on the Netherlands. In December, it participated in the Battle of the Bulge by releasing gliders with supplies for the 101st Airborne Division near Bastogne.

Moved to Belgium in early 1945, and participated in the Western Allied invasion of Germany, participating in the air assault across the Rhine River in March 1945, each aircraft towed two gliders with troops of the 17th Airborne Division and released them near Wesel.

After V-E Day, became part of the United States Air Forces in Europe, and was part of the USAFE European Air Transport System (EATS), supporting the occupation forces in Germany as well as carrying supplies and personnel between various stations in Western Europe. Inactivated in early 1946 while stationed in France, unit inactivated later that year as an administrative unit.

=== Tactical Air Command ===
Reactivated as part of Tactical Air Command (TAC) in 1949 with Fairchild C-82 Packets and various gliders as an assault squadron. Deployed to Japan for combat operations in 1950 for the Korean War. Furnished Fairchild C-119 Flying Boxcar airlift between Japan and Korea and conducted airborne assault and airdrops at Sukchon and Munsan-ni. Relocated to Clark Air Base, Philippines in 1954 after the Korean Armistice Agreement and was inactivated.

=== Tactical Airlift / Vietnam ===
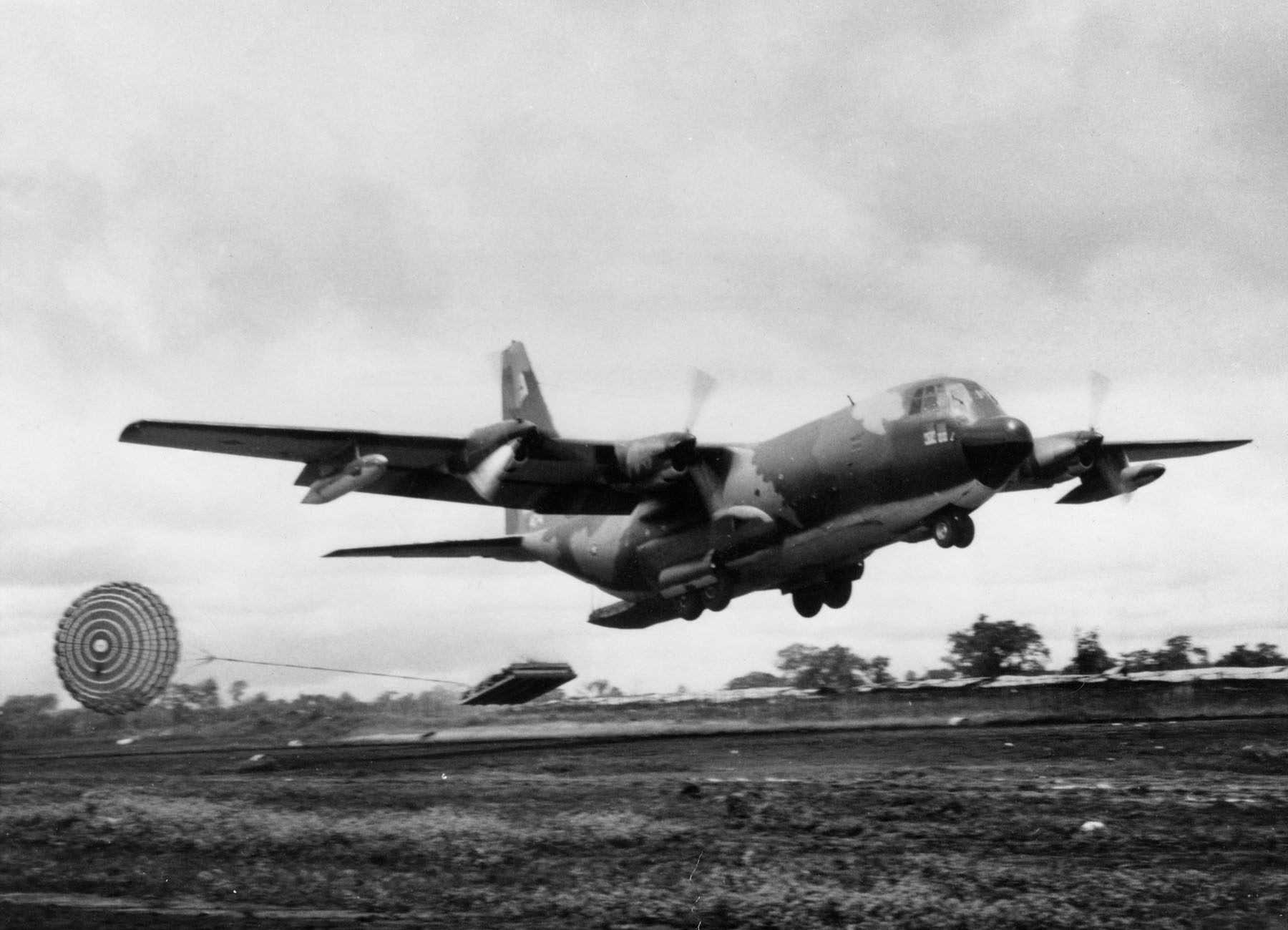
C-130 LAPES delivery to Khe Sanh

Reactivated in early 1957 by TAC at Sewart AFB, Tennessee as one of the initial Lockheed C-130A Hercules squadrons when the aircraft entered operational service. In 1966, increased US involvement in Vietnam brought the 50th to Ching Chuan Kang Air Base, Taiwan. The Red Devils flew combat sorties and airlifted troops and cargo during Operation Blue Light, in crucial support of the 25th Infantry Division (United States). On 22 February 1967, the squadron led the airborne assault force dropping 2nd Battalion, 503rd Infantry Regiment and 173rd Airborne Brigade paratroopers in Operation Junction City. Later supplying 4 million pounds of runway equipment and material to the 2nd Battalion, 26th Marines at Khe Sanh Combat Base. Less than a month later, with the base under siege, the Red Devils aided in emergency airdrops, Low Altitude Parachute Extraction System, and airlift resupply efforts during Battle of Khe Sanh. Many 50th crews were decorated for heroism and airmanship for successfully accomplishing these missions in the face of intense ground fire and severely damaged aircraft. The "Fightin' Five-O" continued supporting combat missions in Vietnam including Operation Delaware, A Sầu Valley and A Lưới Camp airdrop resupply. The 50th also flew evacuations during the Battle of Kham Duc, and continued airlift until the spring of 1973.

=== Global Engagements ===
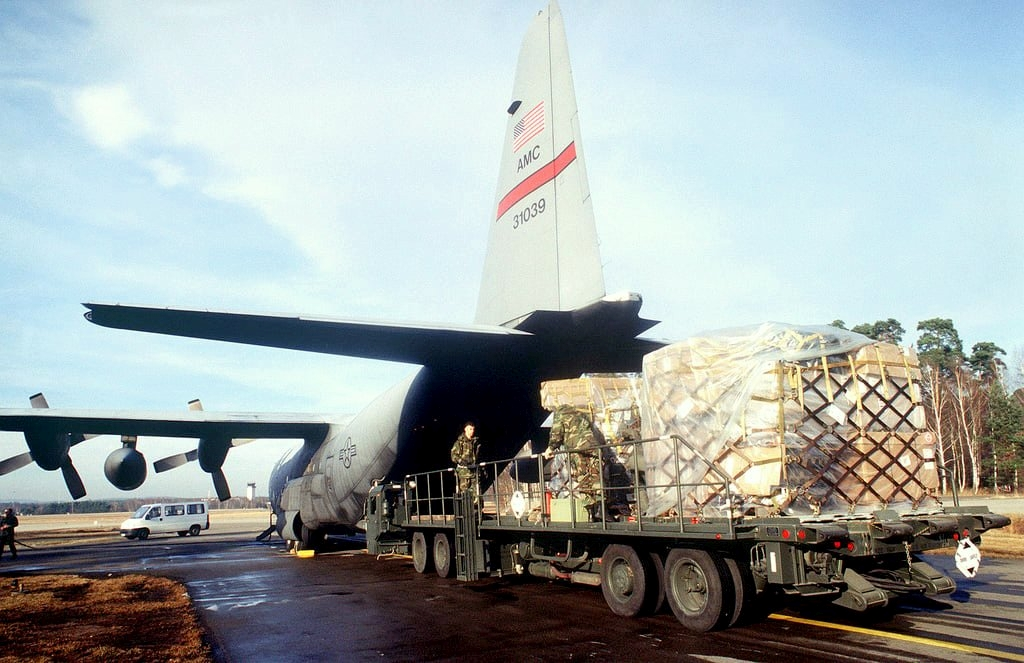
50th AS uploading Operation JOINT GUARD cargo bound for Tuzla AB, Bosnia

From its inception, the 50th TCS/TAS/ALS/AS provided pivotal tactical airlift in major engagements around the world to include the Korean War, Vietnam War, Invasion of Panama, Persian Gulf War, Kosovo War, Operation Enduring Freedom, Iraq War, and the War in Afghanistan (2001–2021).

=== Humanitarian Airlift ===
Also known as America's 9-1-1 Squadron, The 50th provided immediate airlift globally for humanitarian relief. The unit conducted humanitarian airlift missions supporting disasters such as Great Chilean earthquake of 1960, 1965 Operation New Arrivals South Vietnamese refugee airlift, Philippines Typhoon Joan, Turkey 1983 Erzurum earthquake, 1983–1985 famine in Ethiopia, Cameroon Lake Nyos disaster, Somalia Operation Provide Relief and northern Iraq Operation Provide Comfort. In the 21st century, the 50th flew missions to provide relief to victims of the 2004 Indian Ocean earthquake and tsunami, Hurricane Katrina and 2010 Haiti earthquake.

In 2012, elements of the 50th and sister-squadron 52nd Airlift Squadron celebrated 70 years of history with members deployed as the 774th Expeditionary Airlift Squadron in Afghanistan.

The squadron was inactivated on 1 April 2016 as part of broader Air Mobility Command reorganization and the 19th Airlift Wing transition to the Lockheed C-130J Super Hercules.

=== Air Refueling mission ===
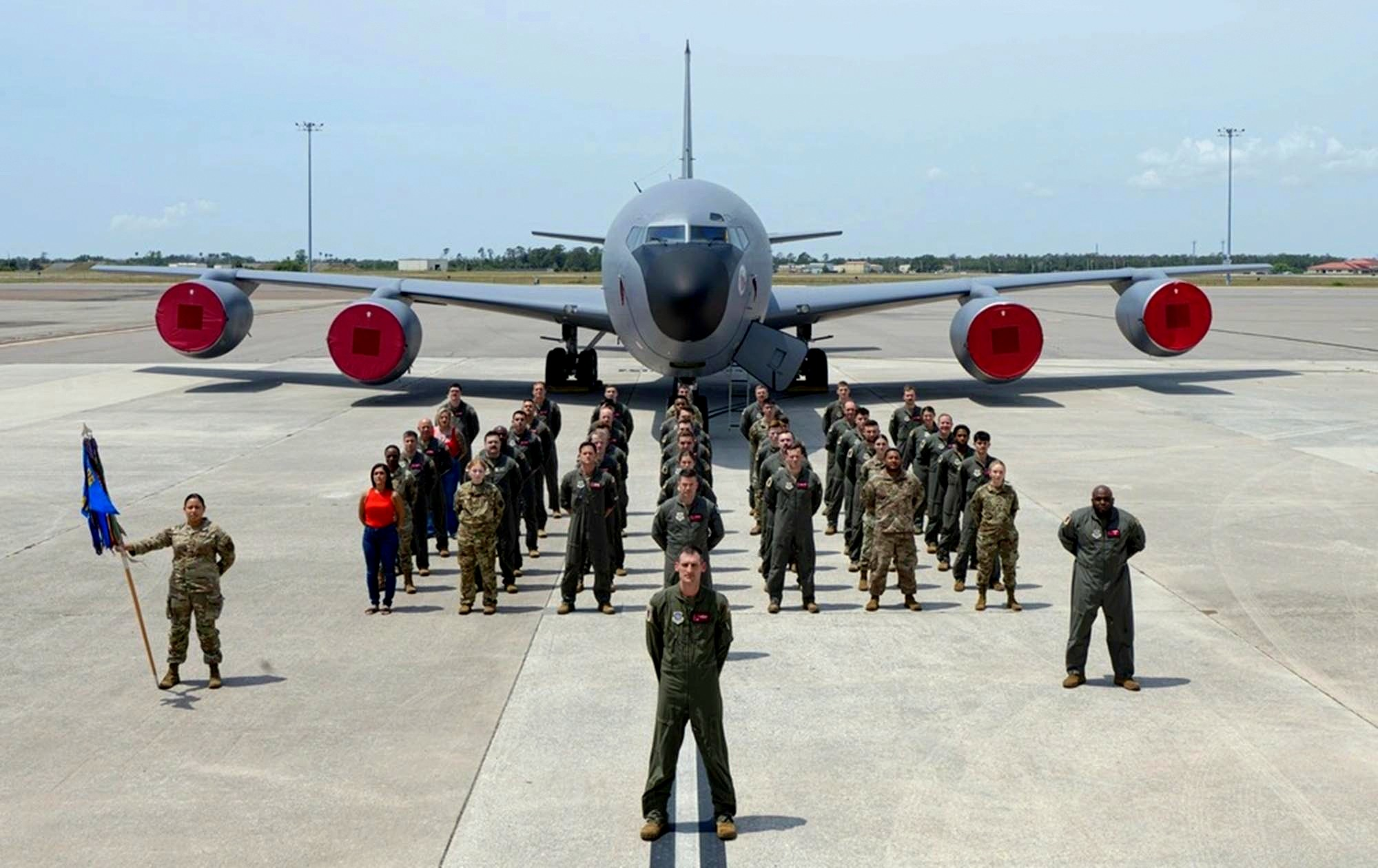
50th Air Refueling Squadron MacDill AFB 2025

A ceremony marking the reactivation of the squadron was held at MacDill Air Force Base, Florida on 2 October 2017. The squadron was redesignated the 50th Air Refueling Squadron, and now flies the Boeing KC-135R Stratotanker as part of the 6th Air Refueling Wing.

=== Campaigns and Decorations ===
- Campaigns. World War II: Sicily; Naples-Foggia; Rome-Arno; Normandy; Northern France; Rhineland; Central Europe. Korea: UN Defensive; UN Offensive; CCF Intervention; First UN Counteroffensive; CCF Spring Offensive; UN Summer-Fall Offensive; Second Korean Winter; Korea Summer-Fall, 1952; Third Korean Winter; Korea, Summer 1953. Southwest Asia: Defense of Saudi Arabia; Liberation and Defense of Kuwait.
- Decorations. Distinguished Unit Citations: Sicily, 11 July 1943; France, [6-7] Jun 1944; South Korea, 28 November-10 Dec 1950. Air Force Outstanding Unit Awards with Combat V Device: 1 November 1967 – 31 December 1969; 12 February-17 May 1975. Air Force Outstanding Unit Awards: 6 May 1953 – 10 September 1954; 11 January-14 Feb 1955; 1 January 1960 – 31 December 1961; 1 September 1962 – 15 April 1963; 1 January 1975 – 30 June 1976; 1 June 1985 – 31 May 1986; 1 July 1991 – 30 June 1993; 1 July 1993 – 30 June 1995; 1 July 1995 – 31 March 1997; 1 April 1997 – 30 June 1998; 1 July 2000 – 30 June 2001; 1 July 2001 – 30 June 2002. Republic of Korea Presidential Unit Citation: 1 July 1951 – 27 July 1953. Republic of Vietnam Gallantry Cross with Palm: 1 April 1966 – 28 January 1973. Philippine Republic Presidential Unit Citation: 21 July-15 Aug 1972.

== Lineage ==
- Constituted as the 50th Transport Squadron on 30 May 1942

Activated on 15 June 1942
Redesignated: 50th Troop Carrier Squadron on 4 July 1942
Inactivated on 27 May 1946

- Redesignated: 50th Troop Carrier Squadron, Medium on 20 September 1949

Activated on 17 October 1949
Redesignated: 50th Troop Carrier Squadron on 1 January 1967
Redesignated: 50th Tactical Airlift Squadron on 1 August 1967
Redesignated: 50th Airlift Squadron on 1 December 1991
Inactivated on 1 April 2016
Redesignated 50th Air Refueling Squadron
Activated on 2 October 2017

=== Assignments ===
- 314th Transport Group (later 314 Troop Carrier Group), 15 June 1942 – 27 May 1946
- 314 Troop Carrier Group, 17 October 1949
- 314th Troop Carrier Wing, 8 October 1957 (attached to 315th Air Division 11 September–c. 16 December 1958, 322d Air Division 27 March-c. 15 August 1961, Unknown. May-Jul 1965 (Note: Probably attached to 315th Air Division, which controlled airlift assets for Pacific Air Forces.)
- 315th Air Division, 26 December 1965
- 314th Troop Carrier Wing (later 314 Tactical Airlift Wing), 23 February 1966
- 374th Tactical Airlift Wing, 31 May 1971
- 314th Tactical Airlift Wing, 15 August 1973 (attached to 322d Tactical Airlift Wing 1 June–18 August 1974, 374th Tactical Airlift Wing 28 April–6 June 1975, 435th Tactical Airlift Wing 6 December 1975 – 12 February 1976, 513th Tactical Airlift Wing 7 September–1 November 1976, 435th Tactical Airlift Wing, 6 April–9 Jun 1977, 513th Tactical Airlift Wing, 14 January–14 March 1978)
- 314th Tactical Airlift Group, 1 November 1978 (attached to 513th Tactical Airlift Wing, 6 August–8 October 1979)
- 314th Tactical Airlift Wing, 15 June 1980 (attached to 313th Tactical Airlift Group, 5 December 1980 – 12 February 1981, 5 June–14 August 1982, 4 October–14 December 1983, 2 June–14 August 1985, 3 August–16 October 1986, 5 October–16 December 1987, 3 December 1988 – 15 February 1989, 4 August–15 October 1991)
- 314th Operations Group, 1 December 1991 (attached to 313th Tactical Airlift Group 27 November 1992 – 31 January 1993, 86th Airlift Wing, 7 December 1995 – 11 March 1996)
- 463d Airlift Group, 1 April 1997 – October 2008 (attached to 86th Airlift Wing, 5 December 1997 – 30 January 1998, 26 May – 26 July 1999)
- 19th Operations Group, October 2008 - 1 April 2016
- 6th Operations Group, 2 October 2017 – present

=== Stations ===
- Drew Field, Florida, 2 March 1942
- Bowman Field, Kentucky, 24 June 1942
- Sedalia Army Air Field, Missouri, 4 November 1942
- Lawson Field, Georgia, 22 February-4 May 1943
- Berguent Airfield, French Morocco, May 1943
- Kairouan Airfield, Tunisia, 26 June 1943
- Castelvetrano Airfield, Sicily, Italy, 1 September 1943 – 13 February 1944
- RAF Saltby (AAF-538), England, 20 February 1944
- Poix Airfield (B-44), France, 28 February 1945
- Villacoublay Airfield (A-42), France, c. 1 December 1945 – 15 February 1946
- Bolling Field, District of Columbia, 15 February-27 May 1946
- Smyrna Air Force Base (later Sewart) Air Force Base), Tennessee, 17 October 1949 – 27 August 1950
- Ashiya Air Base, Japan, 4 September 1950 – 15 November 1954 (operated from Clark Air Base, Philippines, 26 June-5 Sep 1954)
- Sewart Air Force Base, Tennessee, 15 November 1954 – c. 26 December 1965 (deployed to Clark Air Base, Philippines, 29 August-c. 20 December 1958 and May-Jul 1965; Évreux-Fauville Air Base, France, 27 March-c. 15 August 1961)

- Clark Air Base, Philippines, c. 26 December 1965
- Kung Kuan Air Base (later Ching Chuan Kang Air Base), Taiwan, 28 January 1966 – 15 August 1973
- Little Rock Air Force Base, Arkansas, 15 August 1973 – 1 April 2016

Deployed to Rhein-Main Air Base, West Germany, 1 June-18 Aug 1974, 3 December 1975 – 8 February 1976 and 4 April-14 Jun 1977
Deployed to Clark Air Base, Philippines, 25 April-7 Jun 1975
Deployed to RAF Mildenhall, England, 4 September-13 Nov 1976, 14 January-14 Mar 1978, 6 August-8 Oct 1979, 5 December 1980 – 12 February 1981, 5 June-14 Aug 1982, 4 October-14 Dec 1983, 2 June-14 Aug 1985, 3 August-16 Oct 1986, 5 October-16 Dec 1987, 3 December 1988 – 15 February 1989, 4 August-15 Oct 1991, 27 November 1992 – 31 January 1993
Deployed to Ramstein Air Base, Germany, (7 December 1995 – 11 March 1996, 5 December 1997 – 30 January 1998, 26 May – 26 Jul 1999)

- MacDill Air Force Base, Florida, 2 October 2017 – present

=== Aircraft ===
- Douglas C-47 Skytrain, 1942–1945
- Waco CG-4 Glider, 1943–1945
- Fairchild C-82 Packet, 1949–1950
- Waco CG-15 Glider, 1949–1950

- Chase YC-122 Avitruc, 1949–1950
- Fairchild C-119 Flying Boxcar, 1949–1957
- Lockheed C-130 Hercules, 1957–2016
- Boeing KC-135 Stratotanker, 2017–present
