= 32nd Flying Training Squadron =

32d Flying Training Squadron
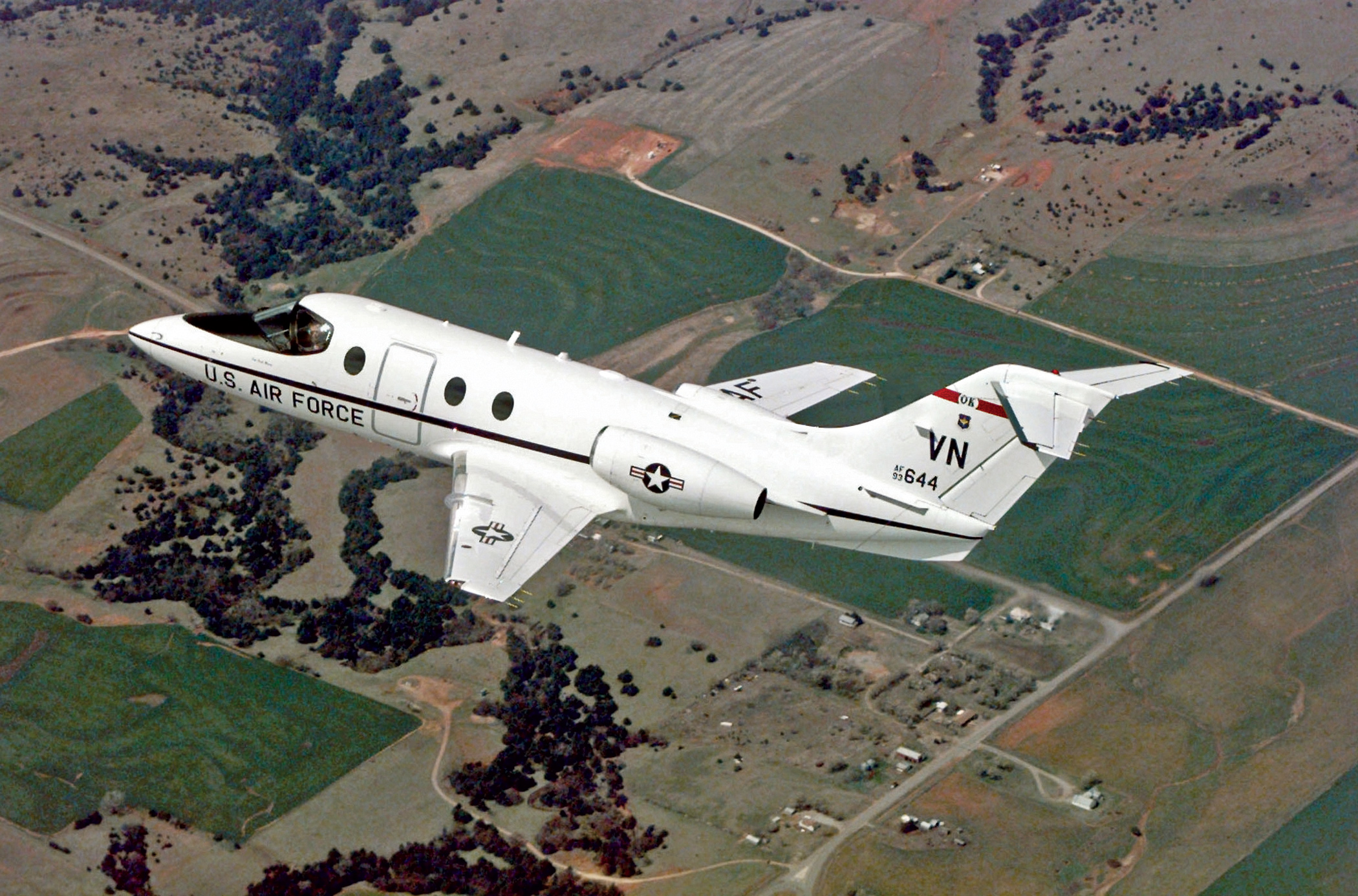
- T-1 Jayhawk from Vance AFB
- Active: 1942–1946; 1973–1979; 1993–1993; 1995–2012
- Country: United States
- Branch: United States Air Force
- Role: Pilot Training
- Part of: Air Education and Training Command
- Engagements: Operation Husky; Operation Overlord; Operation Market Garden; Operation Varsity
- Decorations: Distinguished Unit Citation; Air Force Outstanding Unit Award

Insignia
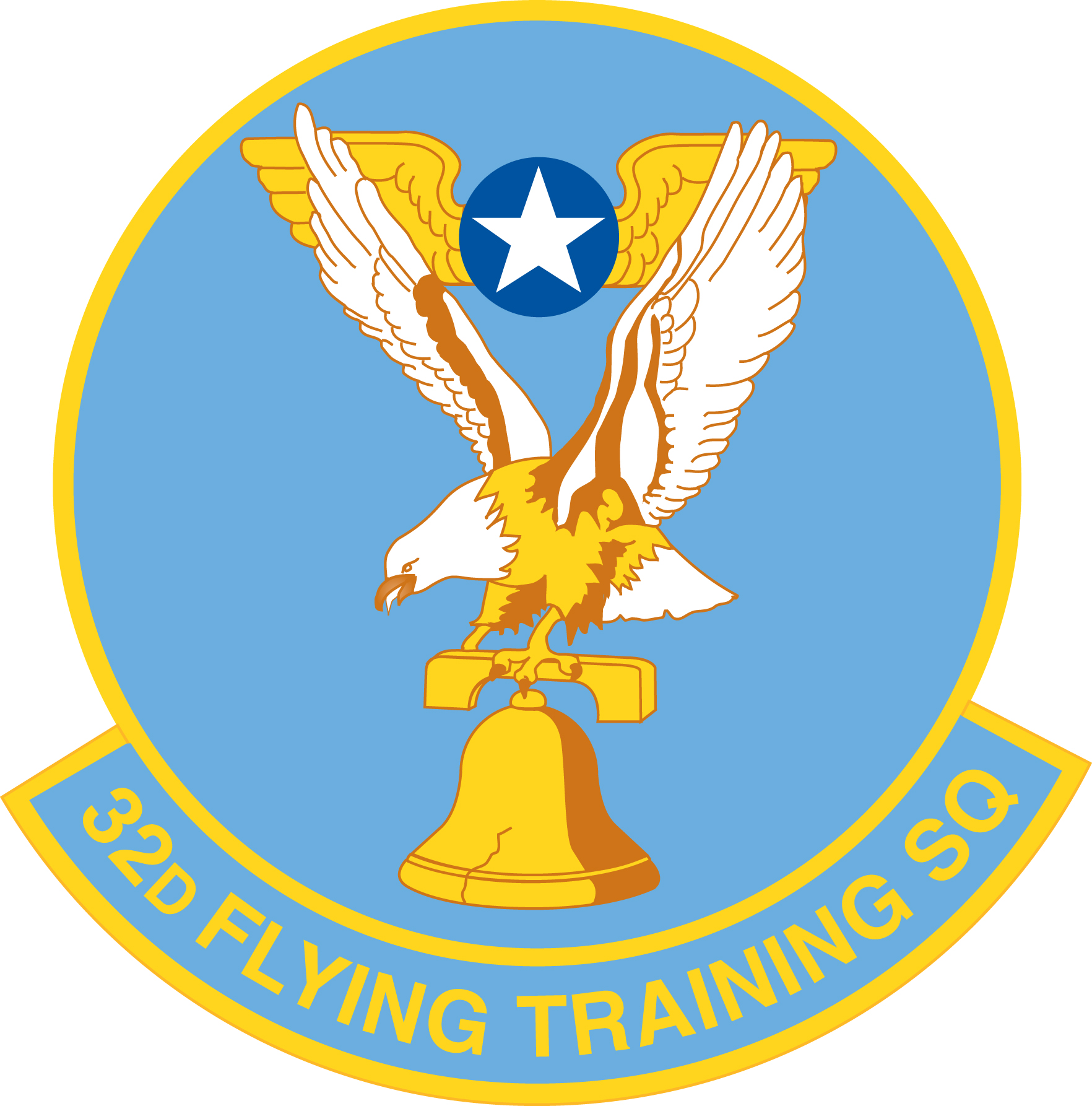
- 32d Flying Training Squadron emblem (approved 5 December 1996)

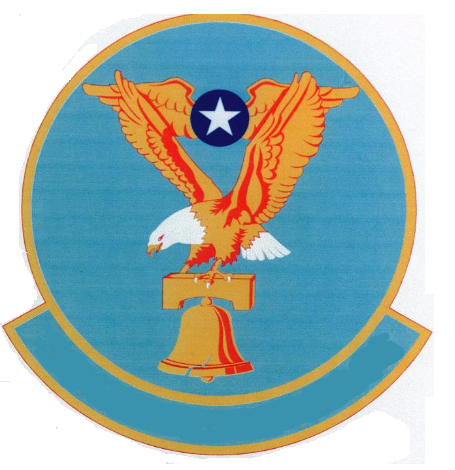
- 32d Tactical Airlift Squadron emblem (approved 2 January 1974)

The 32d Flying Training Squadron was last part of the 71st Flying Training Wing based at Vance Air Force Base, Oklahoma. It operated Beechcraft T-1 Jayhawk aircraft conducting flight training. It was inactivated on 14 September 2012.

== History ==
=== World War II ===
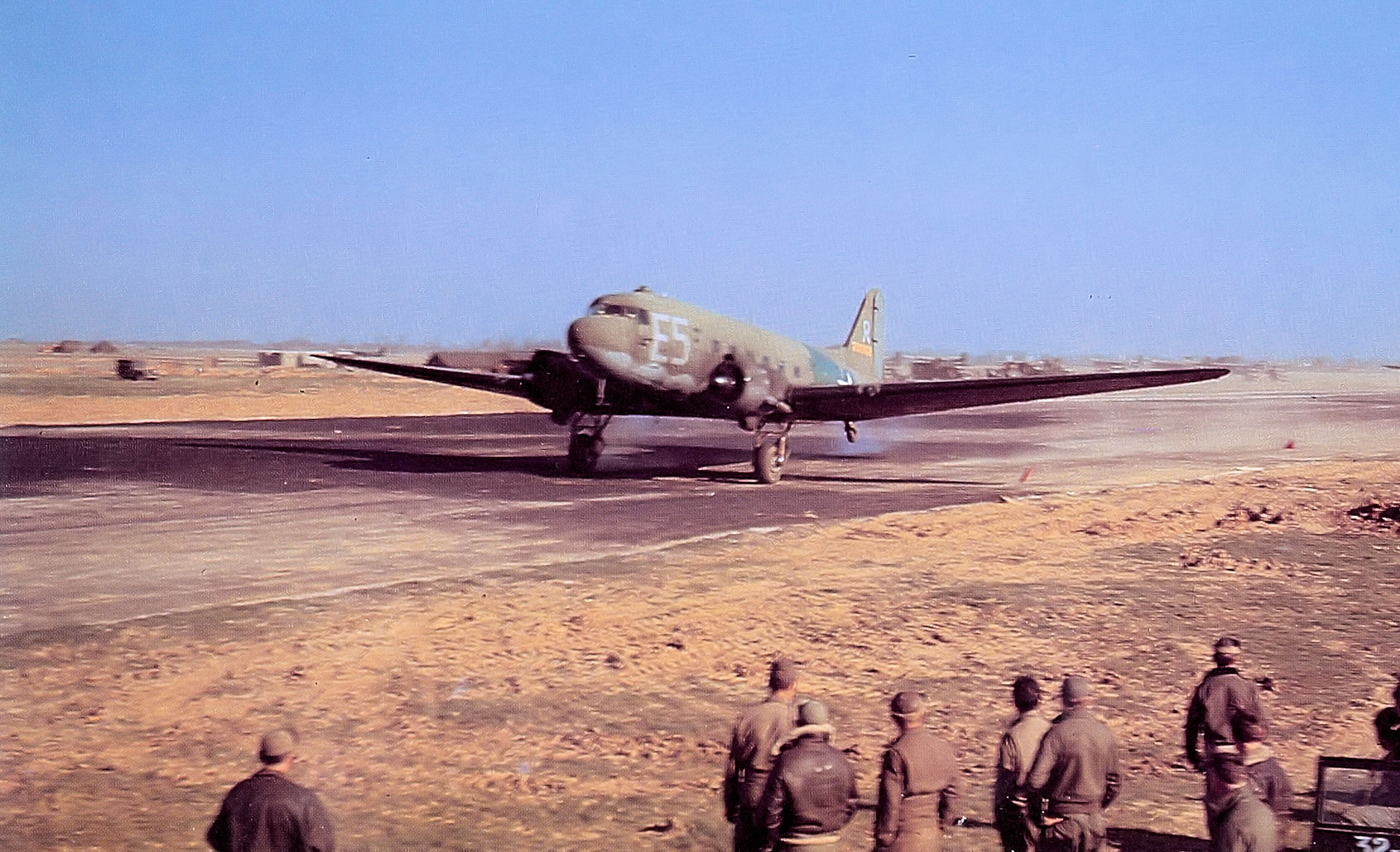
32d Troop Carrier Squadron C-47 taking off from Poix Airfield (Note: Aircraft is Douglas C-47A-15-DK Skytrain serial 42-92862 taking off from Poix Airfield (B-44), France, during Operation Varsity, 24 March 1945.)

Activated in late 1942 under I Troop Carrier Command, the unit was initially equipped with C-47 Skytrains. It trained across various locations in the eastern United States until the end of 1943. In May 1943, the squadron was deployed to French Morocco and assigned to the Twelfth Air Force to support combat operations during the North African Campaign. The unit remained with the Twelfth Air Force, moving to Tunisia and Sicily, where it provided transport, resupply missions, and casualty evacuation for wounded personnel within the Mediterranean Theater of Operations.

In early 1944, the squadron was reassigned to the IX Troop Carrier Command in England, as part of the buildup of Allied forces prior to the D-Day invasion of France. The unit commenced operations on D-Day, June 6, 1944, dropping paratroops into Normandy and the following day releasing gliders carrying reinforcements. For these critical missions, the squadron was awarded a Distinguished Unit Citation.

Following the Normandy invasion, the squadron continued to ferry supplies across the United Kingdom, delivering food, clothing, medicine, gasoline, ordnance, and other essential supplies to the front lines. It also evacuated wounded personnel to rear-zone hospitals. During Operation Market Garden—the airborne assault on the Netherlands—the squadron dropped paratroops near Nijmegen and towed gliders carrying additional reinforcements. In December, it participated in the Battle of the Bulge by releasing gliders loaded with supplies for the 101st Airborne Division near Bastogne.

In early 1945, the squadron moved to Belgium and took part in the Western Allied invasion of Germany. Notably, it participated in the crossing of the Rhine River in March 1945, towing two gliders with troops from the 17th Airborne Division and releasing them near Wesel.

After Victory in Europe Day, the unit became part of the United States Air Forces in Europe, stationed at AAF Station Frankfurt. It supported the occupation forces in Germany and continued to carry supplies and personnel between various stations across Western Europe. The squadron was inactivated on September 30, 1946, in Germany.

=== Airlift operations ===
The squadron was redesignated the 32d Tactical Airlift Squadron and conducted worldwide airlift operations between 1973 and 1979.

=== Pilot training ===
The squadron became the 32d Flying Training Squadron and provided pilot training from 1995 to 2012. The 32d was inactivated on 14 Sep 2012 and the personnel, aircraft and equipment were transferred to the 3d Flying Training Squadron.

=== Campaigns and decorations ===
- Campaigns. World War II: Sicily; Naples-Foggia; Rome-Arno; Normandy; Northern France; Rhineland; Central Europe.
- Decorations. Distinguished Unit Citations: Sicily, 11 Jul 1943; France, [6-7] Jun 1944. Air Force Outstanding Unit Awards: 1 Jul 1995-30 Jun 1996; 1 Jul 1996-30 Jun 1997; 1 Jul 1997-30 Jun 1998; 1 Jul 1998-30 Jun 1999; 1 Jul 1999-30 Jun 2000; 1 Jul 2000-30 Jun 2001; 1 Jul 2001-30 Jun 2002; 1 Jul 2001-30 Jun 2003; 1 Jul 2003-30 Jun 2004; 1 Jul 2004-30 Jun 2005.

== Lineage ==
- Constituted as the 32d Transport Squadron on 28 January 1942

Activated on 2 March 1942
Redesignated 32d Troop Carrier Squadron on 4 July 1942
Inactivated on 30 September 1946

- Redesignated 32d Tactical Airlift Squadron on 18 June 1973

Activated on 1 September 1973
Inactivated on 30 June 1979

- Redesignated 32d Airlift Flight on 1 May 1993

Activated on 31 May 1993
Inactivated on 1 October 1993

- Redesignated 32d Flying Training Squadron on 3 March 1995

Activated on 1 June 1995
Inactivated on 14 September 2012

=== Assignments ===
- 314th Transport Group, 2 March 1942
- 50th Transport Wing, 31 March 1942
- 314th Troop Carrier Group, 19 August 1942 (attached to 441st Troop Carrier Group after September 1945)
- 441st Troop Carrier Group, December 1945 – 30 September 1946
- 314th Tactical Airlift Wing, 1 Sep 1973 (attached to 513th Tactical Airlift Wing, 5 November 1973 – 16 January 1974, 3 September–14 November 1975; 322d Tactical Airlift Wing, 3 February–16 April 1975; 435th Combat Support Group, 3 June–14 August 1976, 13 February–13 April 1977; 435th Tactical Airlift Group, 9 September–14 November 1977)
- 314th Tactical Airlift Group, 1 November 1978 – 30 June 1979 (attached to 313th Tactical Airlift Group, 17 February–14 April 1979)
- 46th Test Wing, 31 May–1 October 1993
- 71st Operations Group, 1 June 1995 – 14 September 2012

=== Stations ===
- Drew Field, Florida, 2 March 1942
- Bowman Field, Kentucky, 24 June 1942
- Army Air Base, Knob Noster, Missouri, 4 November 1942
- Lawson Field, Georgia, 22 February–4 May 1943
- Berguent Airfield, French Morocco, May 1943
- Kairouan Airfield, Tunisia, 26 June 1943
- Castelvetrano Airfield, Sicily, Italy, 1 September 1943 – 13 February 1944
- RAF Saltby (AAF-538), England, 20 February 1944
- Poix Airfield (B-44), France, 28 February 1945
- AAF Station Frankfurt, Germany, 23 September 1945 – 30 September 1946
- Little Rock Air Force Base, Arkansas, 1 September 1973 – 30 June 1979 (Deployed to RAF Mildenhall, England, 5 November 1973 – 16 January 1974, 3 September–14 November 1975, 9 September–14 November 1977, 17 February–14 Apr 1979; Rhein-Main Air Base, Germany, 3 February–16 April 1975, 3 June–14 August 1976, 13 February–13 April 1977)
- Eglin Air Force Base, Florida, 31 May–1 October 1993
- Vance Air Force Base, Oklahoma, 1 June 1995 – 14 September 2012

=== Aircraft ===
- Douglas C-47 Skytrain (1942–1946)
- Lockheed C-130 Hercules (1973–1979)
- Beechcraft T-1 Jayhawk (1995–2012)
