= 61st Airlift Squadron =

US Air Force unit

61st Airlift Squadron

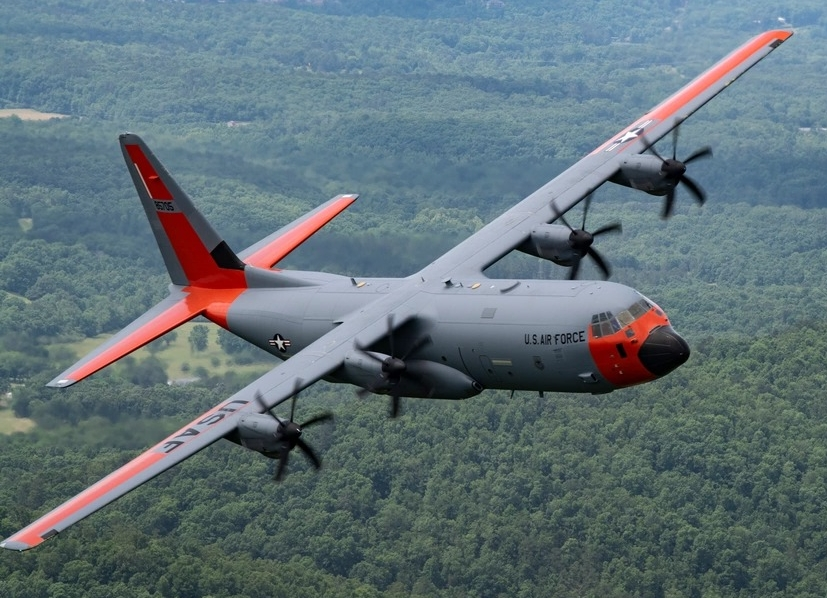
- A 61st Airlift Squadron C-130J Super Hercules flies over Central Arkansas during a tactical formation flight.
- Active: 1942–1946; 1949–present
- Country: United States
- Branch: United States Air Force
- Role: Airlift
- Part of: Air Mobility Command
- Garrison/HQ: Little Rock Air Force Base
- Nickname: Green Hornets
- Engagements: Mediterranean Theater of Operations; Korean War; Vietnam War; Operation Just Cause; Persian Gulf War; Operation Provide Promise; Operation Joint Endeavour; Operation Allied Force; Operation Shining Hope; Operation Joint Guard; Operation Joint Forge; Operation Iraqi Freedom; Operation Enduring Freedom; War in Afghanistan (2001–2021)
- Decorations: Distinguished Unit Citation; Air Force Outstanding Unit Award with Combat "V" Device; Air Force Outstanding Unit Award; Republic of Korea Presidential Unit Citation; Republic of Vietnam Gallantry Cross with Palm

Commanders
- Current commander: Lt. Col. Justin Pedone

Insignia
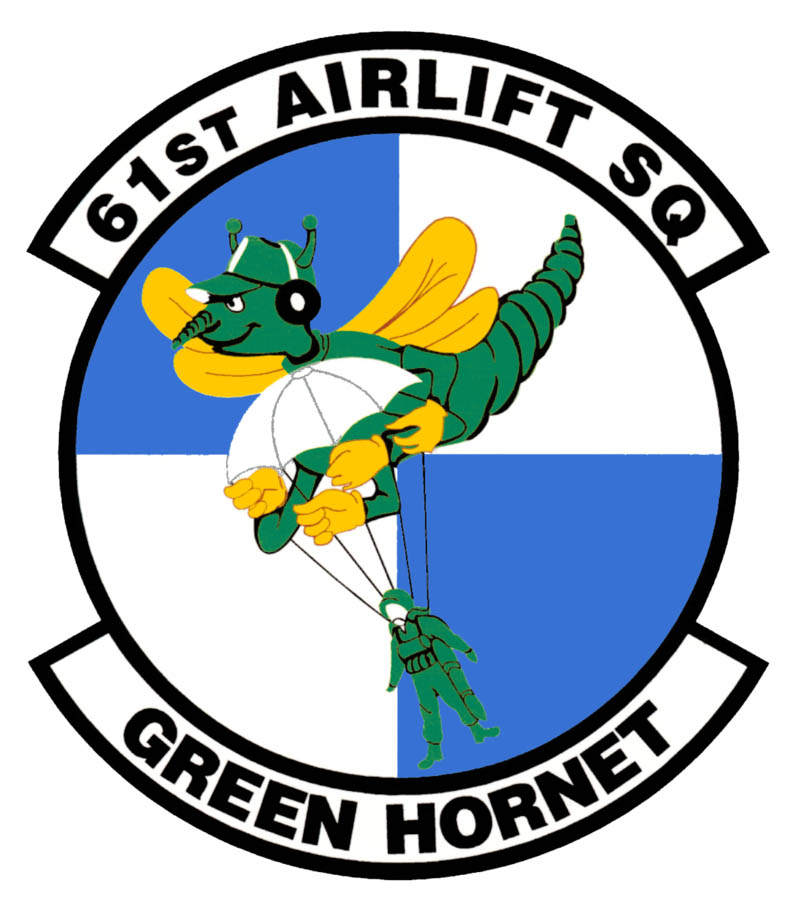
- 61st Airlift Squadron emblem (modified 3 March 1997)

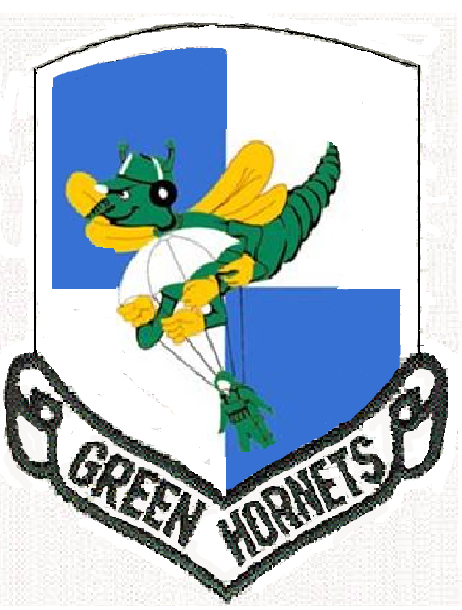
- 61st Troop Carrier Squadron emblem (approved 13 June 1956)

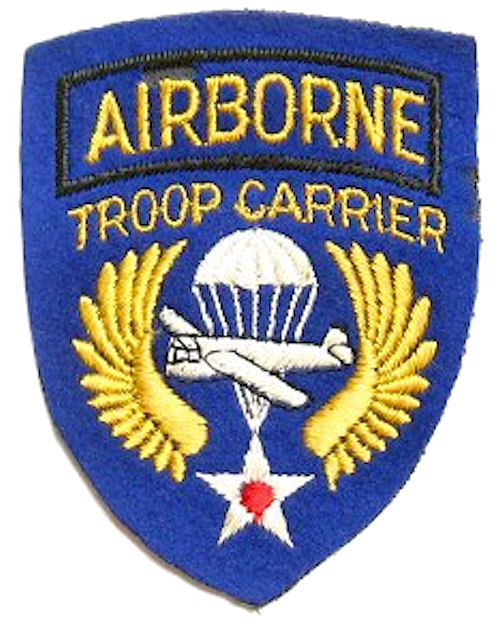
- 61st Troop Carrier Squadron emblem (D-Day WWII)

The 61st Airlift Squadron is a United States Air Force unit assigned to the Air Mobility Command's 19th Airlift Wing at Little Rock Air Force Base, Arkansas. It operates Lockheed C-130J Hercules aircraft for airlift and airdrop operations.

== History ==
=== World War II ===
Constituted as 61st Troop Carrier Squadron (TCS) on 13 Oct 1942. Activated on 26 Oct 1942 at Bowman Field, KY. 315 Troop Carrier Group (attached to 314 Troop Carrier Group) with C-53 and trained in various parts of the eastern United States until the end of May 1943. Deployed to French Morocco in June 1943 and assigned to Twelfth Air Force to support combat operations in the North African campaign. Remained with Twelfth Air Force, moving to Tunisia and Sicily providing transport and resupply operations as well as casualty evacuation of wounded personnel in the Mediterranean Theater of Operations. Reassigned to IX Troop Carrier Command in England during early 1944 as part of the build-up of Allied forces prior to the D-Day invasion of France.

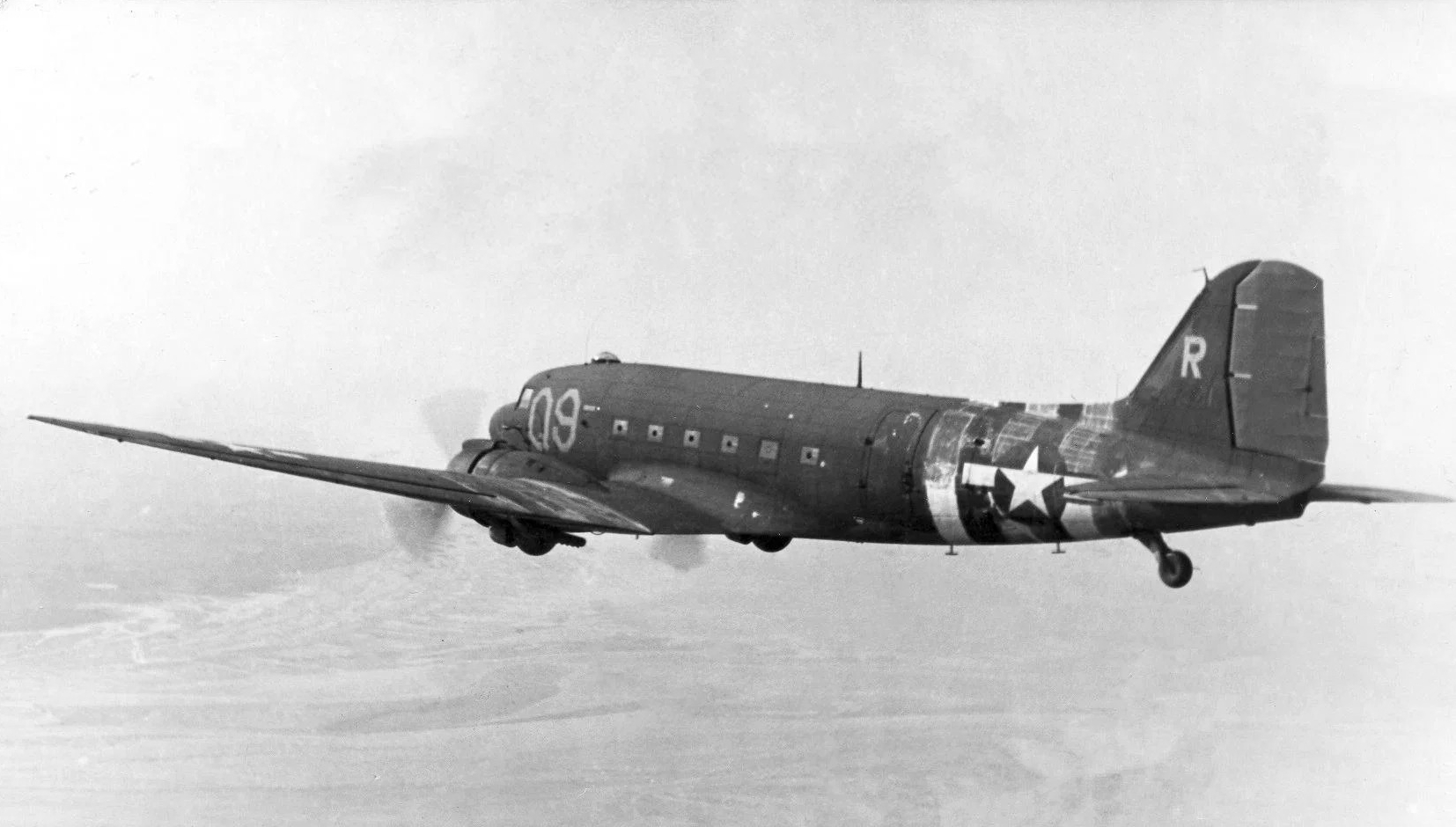
61st Troop Carrier Squadron C-47A 42-92841 "Turf & Sport Special" D-Day

Began operations by dropping paratroops into Normandy on D-Day (6 June 1944) and releasing gliders with reinforcements on the following day. 61st TCS assigned C-47's during the D-Day operations utilized the Q9 fuselage code. The unit received a Distinguished Unit Citation and a French citation for these missions.

After the Normandy invasion the squadron ferried supplies in the United Kingdom. The squadron also hauled food, clothing, medicine, gasoline, ordnance equipment, and other supplies to the front lines and evacuated patients to rear zone hospitals. It dropped paratroops near Nijmegen and towed gliders carrying reinforcements during the Operation Market Garden, the airborne attack on the Netherlands. In December, it participated in the Battle of the Bulge by releasing gliders with supplies for the 101st Airborne Division near Bastogne.

Moved to Belgium in early 1945, and participated in the Western Allied invasion of Germany, participating in the air assault across the Rhine River in March 1945, each aircraft towed two gliders with troops of the 17th Airborne Division and released them near Wesel.

After V-E Day, became part of the United States Air Forces in Europe, moving to AAF Station Frankfurt and was part of the USAFE European Air Transport System, supporting the occupation forces in Germany as well as carrying supplies and personnel between various stations in Western Europe. Inactivated on 30 September 1946 in Germany.

=== Korean War ===
During the Korean War (1950–1953) furnished C-82 Packet & Fairchild C-119 Flying Boxcar airlift between Japan and rough airfields in Korea. Airdropped paratroops and supplies at Sukchon/Sunchon and Munsan-ni during combat operations.

=== Tactical Air Command ===
Remained in Japan until 1954, then became a Tactical Air Command Troop Carrier squadron, assigned to Sewart Air Force Base, Tennessee under Eighteenth Air Force. Supported Air Force and Army units in the United States with tactical airlift and troop carrier operations, including support for army airborne units 82d Airborne Division at Fort Bragg, North Carolina, and 101st Airborne Division at Fort Campbell, Kentucky as required. Transitioned to Lockheed C-130A Hercules aircraft in 1956.

=== Greenland & Antarctica Operations ===
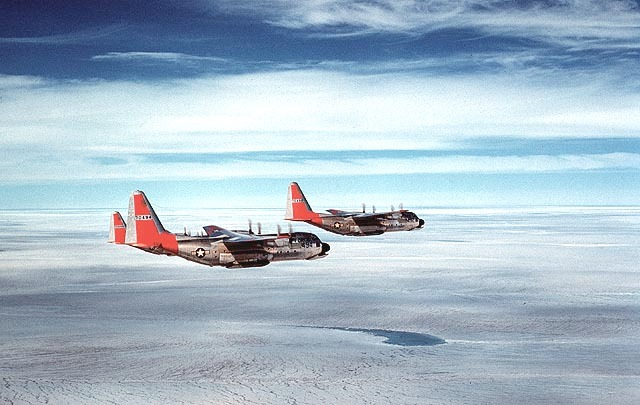
61st TCS C-130D formation over Greenland Ice Cap 1959

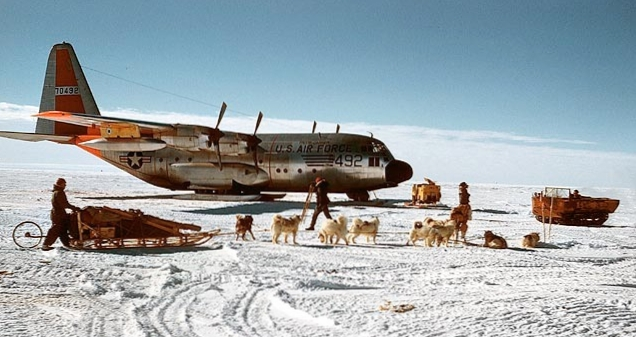
61st TCS C-130D 57-0492 Amundsen–Scott South Pole Station Antarctica Jan 1960

The 61st Troop Carrier Squadron also operated the first ski-equipped C-130D Skibird variant, developing ice/snow landing & JATO assisted takeoff procedures for polar airlift missions conducting the initial Antarctica Operation Deep Freeze C-130 ice-landings and supporting the Distant Early Warning Line sites in Greenland & Canada during the late 50s and early 60s. In 1959, continuous operations were conducted between Sondrestrom Air Base and two DYE Stations on the Greenland ice cap. Accessible only by air, everything required to build these Ice Cap sites had to meet the size and weight limitations of the C-130D. Items could not exceed 9x9x41 feet or weigh more than 15 tons. In six months, twelve Skibirds airlifted 127,985 tons of construction materials needed to build the radar stations.

=== Vietnam War ===
During the Vietnam War, the squadron transported supplies from the Philippines into Southeast Asia, Dec 1965-Jun 1966. Part of squadron deployed to South Vietnam in the summer of 1972 to test the Adverse Weather Aerial Delivery System (AWADS) in combat for the first time. In 1972, operated from Taiwan and provided flood relief in the Philippines.

=== Deployments ===
After the end of the Vietnam War, engaged in routine theater airlift operations, both in the United States and in Europe, deploying frequently to RAF Mildenhall, England and Rhein-Main Air Base, West Germany to support USAFE and USAREUR Army units and combat exercises. Airdropped humanitarian relief supplies to Kurdish civilians in northern Iraq, Apr-May 1991 in the immediate aftermath of the 1991 Gulf War.

=== Air Mobility Command ===
Conducted airdrop and aeromedical evacuation; supported combatant commanders with theater delivery of personnel and supplies, 2000 – present

=== Campaigns and decorations ===
- Campaigns: World War II: Sicily; Naples-Foggia; Rome-Arno; Normandy; Northern France; Rhineland; Central Europe. Korea: UN Defensive; UN Offensive; CCF Intervention; First UN Counteroffensive; CCF Spring Offensive; UN Summer-Fall Offensive; Second Korean Winter; Korean Summer-Fall, 1952; Third Korean Winter; Korea, Summer 1953. Vietnam: Vietnam Defensive; Vietnam Air. Armed Forces Expeditionary Streamers. Panama, 1989–1990.
- Decorations: Distinguished Unit Citations: Sicily, 11 July 1943; France, [6-7] Jun 1944; Korea, 28 November-10 Dec 1950. Air Force Outstanding Unit Awards: 6 May 1953 – 10 September 1954; 11 January-14 Feb 1955; 23 March-22 Aug 1959; 1 January 1960 – 31 December 1961; 1 September 1962 – 15 April 1963; 1 June 1969 – 31 May 1971; 1 January 1975 – 30 June 1976; 1 June 1985 – 31 May 1986; 1 July 1991 – 30 June 1993; 1 July 1993 – 30 June 1995; 1 July 1995 – 31 March 1997; 1 April 1997 – 30 June 1998; 1 July 2000 – 30 June 2001; 1 July 2001 – 30 June 2002. Republic of Korea Presidential Unit Citation: 1 July 1951 – 27 July 1953. Republic of Vietnam Gallantry Cross with Palm: 1 April 1966 – 7 July 1968. General Joseph Smith Trophy, 2015 Most Outstanding Airlift Squadron in Air Mobility Command. General Joseph Smith Trophy, 2019 Most Outstanding Airlift Squadron in Air Mobility Command.

== Lineage ==
- Constituted as the 61st Troop Carrier Squadron on 13 October 1942

Activated on 26 October 1942
Inactivated on 30 September 1946

- Redesignated 61st Troop Carrier Squadron, Medium on 20 September 1949

Activated on 17 October 1949
Redesignated 61st Troop Carrier Squadron on 1 March 1966
Redesignated 61st Tactical Airlift Squadron on 1 May 1967
Redesignated 61st Airlift Squadron on 1 December 1991

=== Assignments ===
- 315th Troop Carrier Group, 26 October 1942 (attached to 314th Troop Carrier Group
- 314th Troop Carrier Group, 15 March 1943 (attached to 441st Troop Carrier Group in Oct 1945)
- 441st Troop Carrier Group Dec 1945 – 30 September 1946
- 314th Troop Carrier Group, 17 October 1949
- 314th Troop Carrier Wing, 8 October 1957
- 839th Air Division, 1 December 1965 (attached to Troop Carrier Wing Provisional, 4413)
- 64th Troop Carrier Wing (later 64th Tactical Airlift Wing), 1 July 1966 (attached to 513th Tactical Airlift Wing 6 May-11 Aug 1967, 8 April-29 Jun 1968, 27 May-6 Jul 1970; 322d Tactical Airlift Wing 21 October-19 Dec 1970)
- 314th Tactical Airlift Wing, 31 May 1971 (attached to 374th Tactical Airlift Wing, 16 May-1 Sep 1972; 513th Tactical Airlift Wing, 5 January-16 Mar 1973; 322d Tactical Airlift Wing, 5 June-11 Aug 1973, 16 October-16 Dec 1974, 15–30 June 1975; 435th Tactical Airlift Wing, 30 June-17 Aug 1975, 5 March-17 May 1976, 3 December 1976 – 13 February 1977, 5 July-9 Sep 1977, 13 July-13 Sep 1978)
- 314th Tactical Airlift Group, 1 November 1978 (attached to: 435th Tactical Airlift Wing 5 April-12 Jun 1980)
- 314th Tactical Airlift Wing, 15 June 1980 (attached to 435th Tactical Airlift Wing, 4 December 1982 – 15 February 1983; 313th Tactical Airlift Group, 8 August-10 Oct 1984, 1 December 1985 – 12 February 1986, 1 February-15 Apr 1987, 3 April-15 Jun 1988, 27 December 1990 – 12 May 1991, 3 February-6 April 1992)
- 314th Operations Group, 1 December 1991
- 463d Airlift Group, 1 April 1997
- 19th Operations Group, 1 October 2008 – present

=== Stations ===
- Bowman Field, Kentucky, 26 October 1942
- Army Air Base, Knob Noster, Missouri, 5 November 1942
- Lawson Field, Georgia, 20 February-3 May 1943
- Berguent Airfield, French Morocco, May 1943
- Kairouan Airfield, Tunisia, 26 June 1943
- Castelvetrano Airfield, Sicily, 1 September 1943 – 16 February 1944
- RAF Saltby (AAF-538), England, 24 February 1944
- Poix Airfield (B-44), France, Feb 1945
- AAF Station Frankfurt, Germany, 15 October 1945 – 30 September 1946
- Smyrna Air Force Base (later Sewart Air Force Base), Tennessee, 17 October 1949 – 27 August 1950
- Ashiya Air Base, Japan, 4 September 1950 – 15 November 1954
- Sewart Air Force Base, Tennessee, 15 November 1954 (deployed to Clark Air Base, Philippines, 1 December 1965 – 30 June 1966; RAF Mildenhall, England, 5 May-14 Aug 1967, 28 March-29 Jun 1968)
- Little Rock Air Force Base, Arkansas, 5 March 1970 – present (deployed to RAF Mildenhall, England, 28 May-7 Jul 1970; 3 January-17 Mar 1973, 5 March-17 May 1976, 3 December 1976 – 13 February 1977, 5 July-9 Sep 1977, 13 July-13 Sep 1978, 5 April-12 Jun 1980, 4 December 1982 – 15 February 1983, 8 August-10 Oct 1984, 1 December 1985 – 12 February 1986, 1 February-15 Apr 1987, 3 April-15 Jun 1988, 27 December 1990 – 12 May 1991, 3 February-6 Apr 1992; Rhein-Main Air Base, West Germany, 12 October-19 Dec 1970, 12 June-16 Aug 1973, 3 October-16 Dec 1974, 15 June-17 Aug 1975; Ching Chuan Kang Air Base, Taiwan, 16 May-1 Sep 1972)

=== Aircraft ===
- Douglas C-53 Skytrooper, 1942–1943
- Douglas C-47 Skytrain, 1943–1945
- Waco CG-4A, 1943–1945
- Piper L-4 Grasshopper, 1945
- Fairchild C-82 Packet, 1949–1950
- Fairchild C-119 Flying Boxcar, 1950–1957
- Lockheed C-130 Hercules, 1956–2013
- Lockheed C-130J Super Hercules 2013-Present
