= 62nd Airlift Squadron =

62nd Airlift Squadron

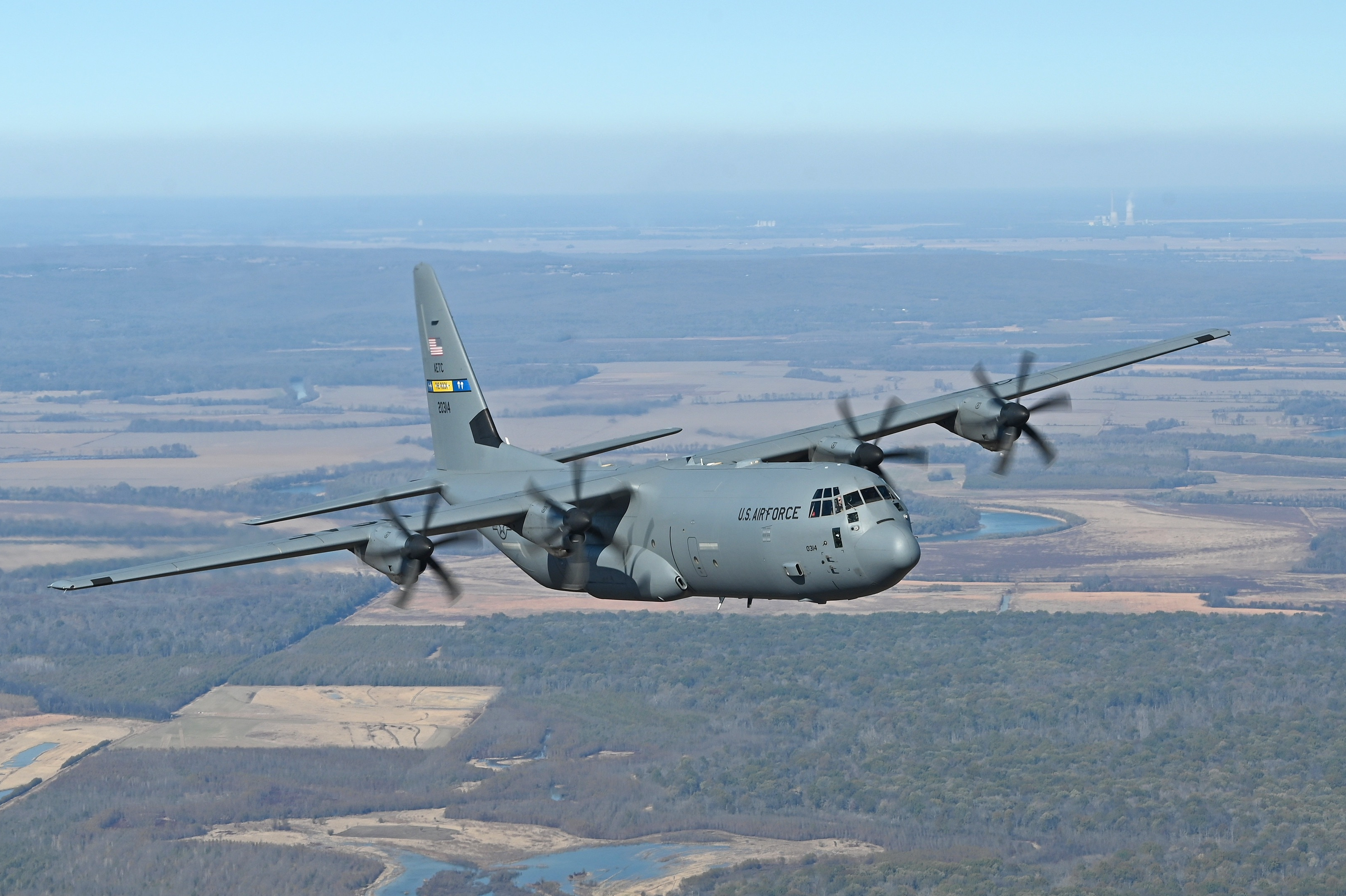
- A 62d Airlift Squadron assigned C-130J Super Hercules conducts tactical formation training near Little Rock AFB, Arkansas
- Active: 1942–1946; 1949–present
- Country: United States
- Branch: United States Air Force
- Role: Airlift Training
- Part of: Air Education and Training Command
- Garrison/HQ: Little Rock Air Force Base
- Nicknames: Blue Barons, Yacht Club, Jodies, Gooney
- Motto: Primus In Toto Latin First In Everything
- Colors: Blue
- Engagements: Mediterranean Theater of Operations; European Theater of Operations; Korean War; Vietnam War
- Decorations: Distinguished Unit Citation; Air Force Outstanding Unit Award; Republic of Korea Presidential Unit Citation

Commanders
- Current commander: Lt. Col. Caitlin Nam

Insignia
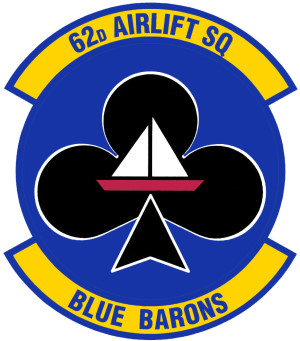
- 62nd Airlift Squadron emblem (Modified, 9 December 1994)

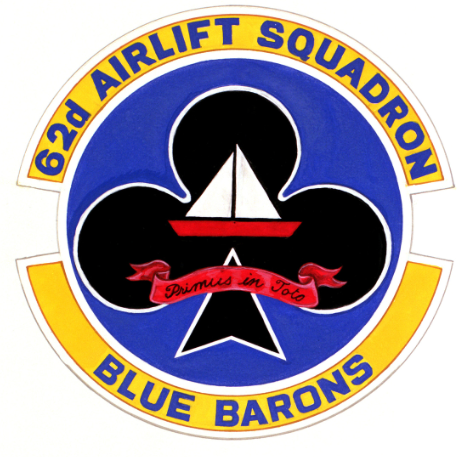
- 62nd Airlift Squadron emblem (Approved, 1 December 1991)

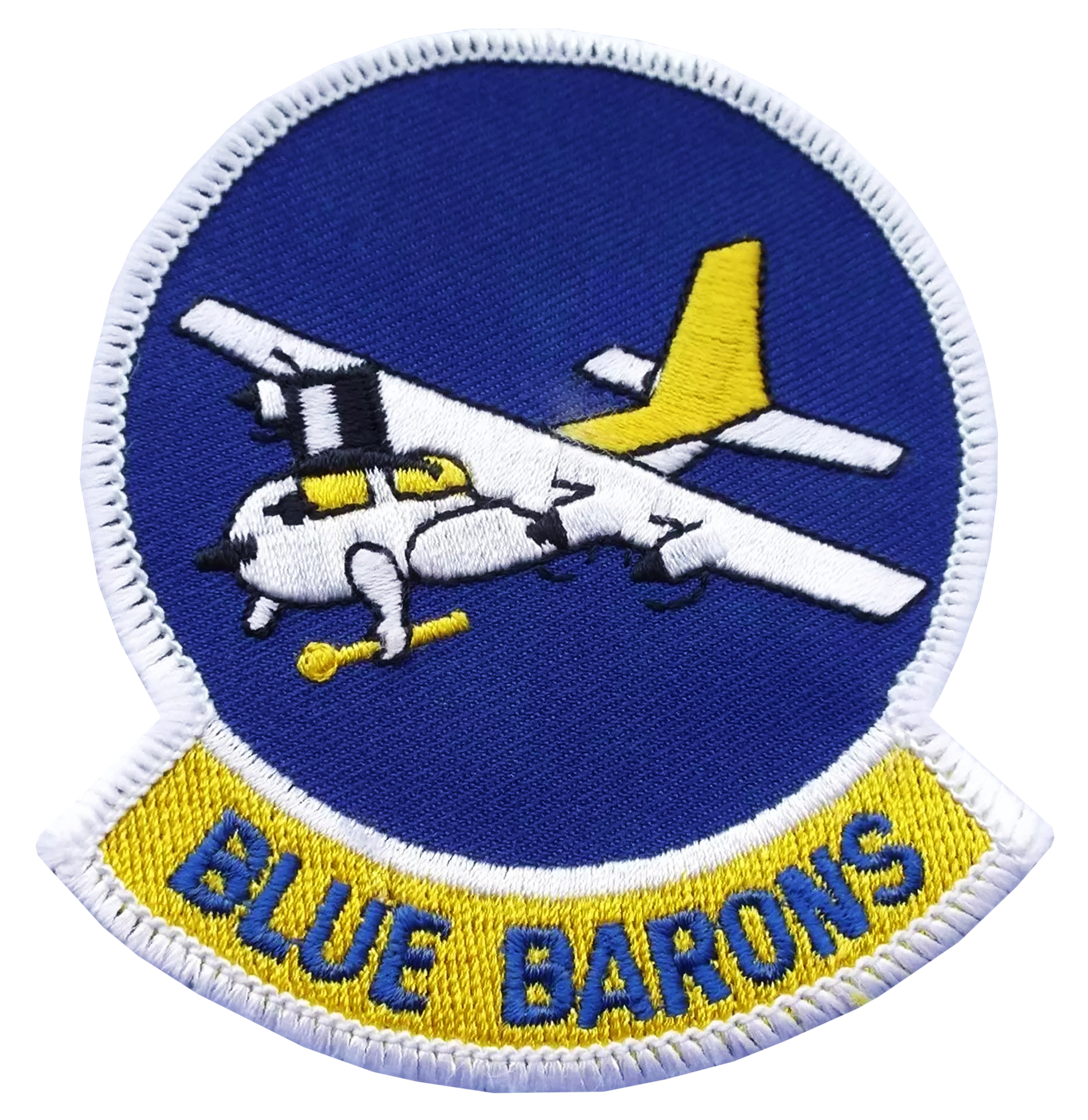
- 62 Tactical Airlift Squadron emblem (Modified, 1 May 1967)

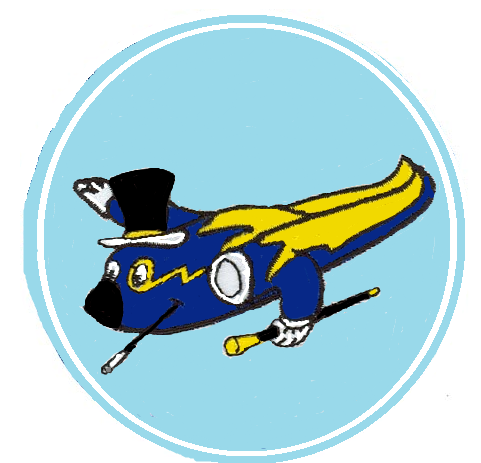
- 62nd Troop Carrier Squadron, Medium emblem (Approved, 24 April 1953)

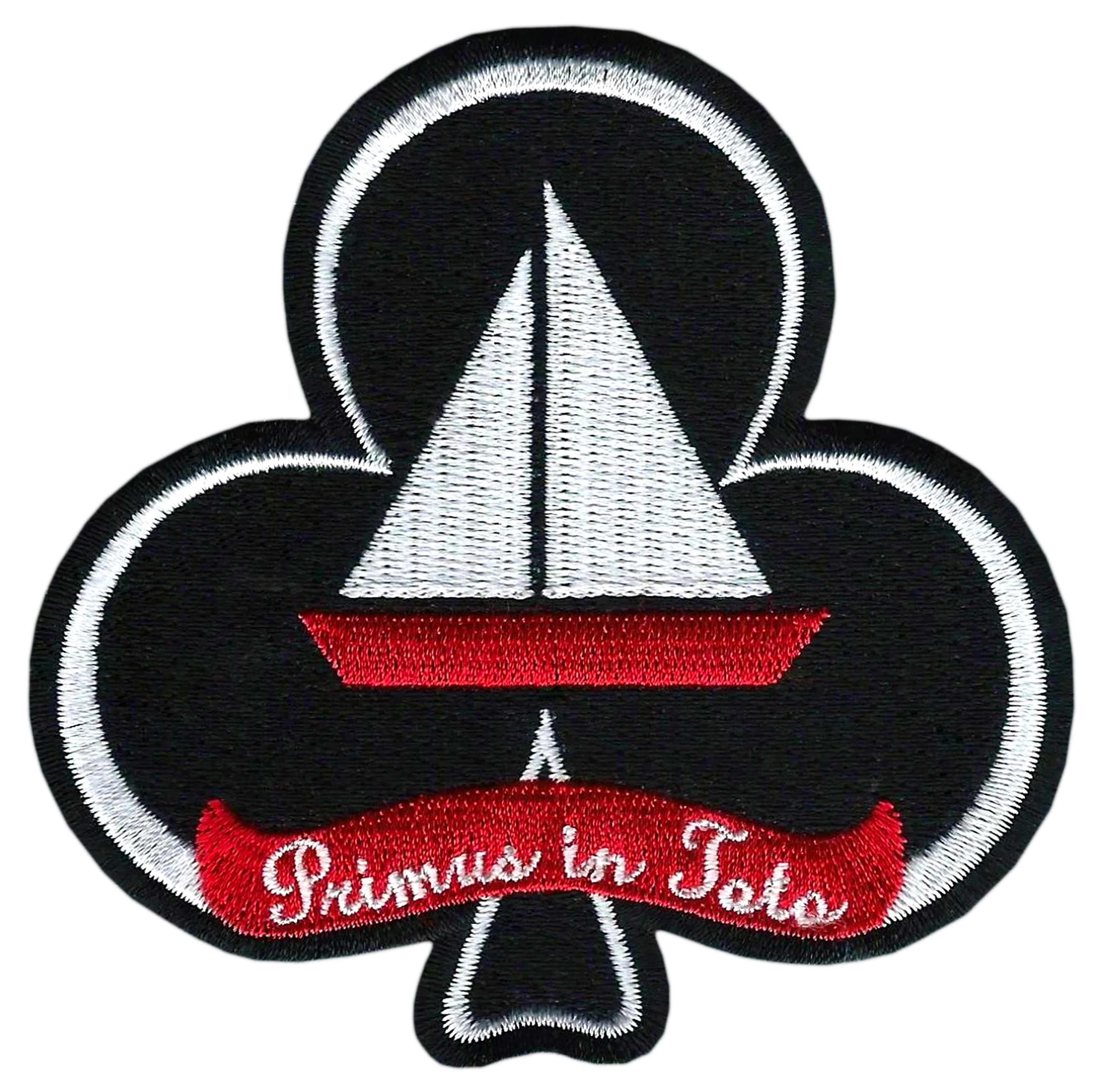
- 62d Troop Carrier Squadron emblem (WWII)

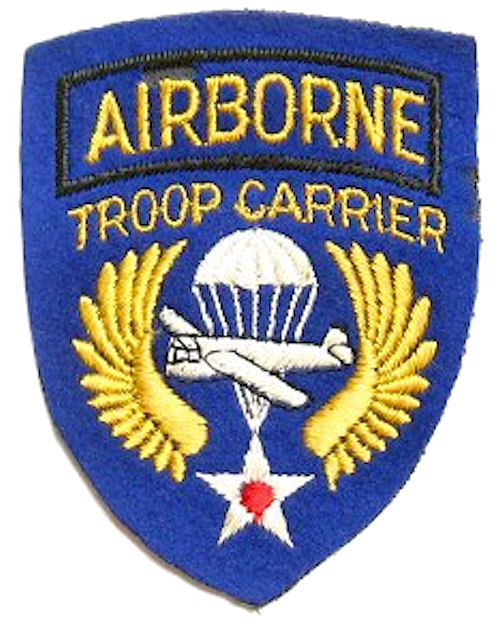
- 62d Troop Carrier Squadron emblem (D-Day WWII)

The 62nd Airlift Squadron is part of the 314th Airlift Wing at Little Rock Air Force Base, Arkansas. Originally constituted in 1942 as the 62nd Troop Carrier Squadron, it first deployed to Morocco in 1943, remaining in Europe until its inactivation in 1946. Reactivated three years later and deployed to Japan during the Korean War. Since 1971, the 62d has excelled as the premiere USAF/DoD C-130A/B/E/H/J Formal Training Unit. It most recently operates Lockheed C-130J Super Hercules aircraft and provides advanced aircrew training for combat airlift and airdrop operations.

== History ==
=== World War II ===
Activated in late 1942 under I Troop Carrier Command and equipped with Douglas C-47 Skytrains. Trained in various parts of the eastern United States. Deployed to French Morocco in May 1943 and assigned to Twelfth Air Force to support combat operations in the North African Campaign. Remained with Twelfth Air Force, moving to Tunisia and Sicily providing transport and resupply operations as well as casualty evacuation of wounded personnel in the Mediterranean Theater of Operations (MTO). Reassigned to IX Troop Carrier Command in England during early 1944 as part of the build-up of Allied forces prior to the D-Day invasion of France.

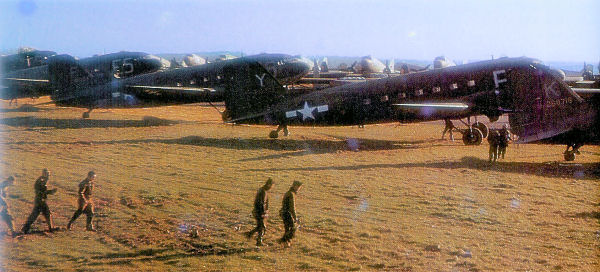
C-47's from the 62d TCS prepare for departure at Saltby Air Field, June 5, 1944

Began operations by dropping 82nd Airborne Division paratroops into Normandy on D-Day (6 June 1944) and releasing gliders with reinforcements on the following day. 62d TCS assigned C-47's during the D-Day operations utilized the E5 fuselage code. The unit received a Distinguished Unit Citation and a French citation for these missions.

After the Normandy invasion the squadron ferried supplies in the United Kingdom. The squadron also hauled food, clothing, medicine, gasoline, ordnance equipment, and other supplies to the front lines and evacuated patients to rear zone hospitals. It dropped paratroops near Nijmegen and towed gliders carrying reinforcements during the airborne attack on the Netherlands. In December, it participated in the Battle of the Bulge by releasing gliders with supplies for the 101st Airborne Division near Bastogne.

Moved to Belgium in early 1945, and participated in the Western Allied invasion of Germany, participating in the air assault across the Rhine River in March 1945, each aircraft towed two gliders with troops of the 17th Airborne Division and released them near Wesel.

=== Post-War ===
After V-E Day, became part of the United States Air Forces in Europe, at Villacoublay Airfield and was part of the European Air Transport System, supporting the occupation forces in Germany as well as carrying supplies and personnel between various stations in Western Europe. Inactivated in early 1946 while stationed in France.

=== Tactical Air Command ===
Reactivated as part of Tactical Air Command (TAC) in 1949 with Fairchild C-82 Packets and various gliders as an assault squadron.

=== Korean War ===
Deployed to Japan for combat operations in 1950 for the Korean War. Furnished Fairchild C-119 Flying Boxcar airlift between Japan and Korea and airdropped paratroops and supplies at Sukchon/Sunchon and Munsan-ni. Conducted airborne assaults on Sukchon and Munsan-ni.

=== Return to United States ===
Returned to the United States in 1954, was equipped by TAC as one of the initial Lockheed C-130A Hercules squadrons when the aircraft entered operational service. The squadron flew airlift from the Philippines into Vietnam, March–May 1965.

=== Flying Training ===
As the world's premiere C-130 Formal Training Unit, the 62nd has conducted initial and advanced Department of Defense and Allied forces Lockheed C-130A/B/E/H/J flightcrew training continuously since 1971.

=== Campaigns and Decorations ===
- Campaigns. World War II: Sicily; Naples-Foggia; Rome-Arno; Normandy; Northern France; Rhineland; Central Europe. Korea: UN Defensive; UN Offensive; CCF Intervention; First UN Counteroffensive; CCF Spring Offensive; UN Summer-Fall Offensive; Second Korean Winter; Korea Summer-Fall, 1952; Third Korean Winter; Korea, Summer 1953. Vietnam: Vietnam Defensive.
- Decorations. Distinguished Unit Citations: Sicily, 11 July 1943; France, [6–7] Jun 1944; Korea, 28 November-10 Dec 1950. Air Force Outstanding Unit Awards: 6 May 1953 – 10 September 1954; 11 January-14 Feb 1955; 1 January 1960 – 31 December 1961; 1 September 1962 – 15 April 1963; 1 December 1965 – 30 June 1967; 1 June 1969 – 31 May 1971; 1 January 1975 – 30 June 1976; 1 June 1985 – 31 May 1986; 1 July 1991 – 30 June 1993; 1 July 1993 – 30 June 1995; 1 July 1995 – 31 March 1997; 1 July 1997 – 30 June 1999; 1 July 1999 – 30 June 2001; 1 July 2001 – 30 June 2003; 1 July 2003 – 30 June 2004; 1 July 2005 – 30 June 2006; 1 July 2006 – 30 June 2007; 1 July 2008 – 30 June 2009. Republic of Korea Presidential Unit Citation, 1 July 1951 – 27 July 1953.

== Lineage ==
- Constituted as the 62d Troop Carrier Squadron on 27 November 1942

Activated on 5 December 1942
Inactivated on 27 August 1946

- Redesignated 62d Troop Carrier Squadron, Medium on 20 September 1949

Activated on 17 October 1949
Redesignated 62d Troop Carrier Squadron on 1 March 1966
Redesignated 62d Tactical Airlift Squadron on 1 May 1967
Redesignated 62d Airlift Squadron on 1 December 1991

=== Assignments ===
- 315th Troop Carrier Group, 5 December 1942 (attached to 89th Troop Carrier Group)
- 314th Troop Carrier Group, 15 March 1943
- Third Air Force, Aug-27 August 1946
- 314th Troop Carrier Group, 17 October 1949
- 314th Troop Carrier Wing, 8 October 1957 (attached to 322d Air Division 6 June–August 1961, Detachment 3, 315th Air Division, 19 May-29 July 1962 and 5 August–October 1964, 315th Air Division, March–May 1965)
- 839th Air Division, 1 December 1965 (attached to Troop Carrier Wing Provisional, 4413)
- 64th Troop Carrier Wing (later 64th Tactical Airlift Wing), 1 July 1966 (attached to 513th Tactical Airlift Wing, 15 December 1967 – 8 April 1968, 29 June-2 Oct 1968, 16 November 1969 – 11 January 1970, 3 July-30 August 1970; 322d Tactical Airlift Wing, 10 April-12 Jun 1971)
- 314th Tactical Airlift Wing, 31 May 1971
- 34th Tactical Airlift Training Group, 1 November 1978
- 314th Operations Group, 1 December 1991 – present

=== Stations ===
- Sedalia Army Air Field, Missouri, 5 December 1942
- Del Valle Army Air Base, Texas, 12 December 1942
- Pope Field, North Carolina, 12 January 1943
- Lawson Field, Georgia, 25 February-3 May 1943
- Berguent Airfield, French Morocco, 29 May 1943
- Kairouan Airfield, Tunisia, 24 June 1943
- Castelvetrano Airfield, Sicily, 3 September 1943 – 15 February 1944
- RAF Saltby (AAF-538), England, 24 February 1944
- Poix Airfield (B-44), France, Mar 1945
- Villacoublay Airfield (A-42), France, 15 October 1945 – 15 February 1946
- Bolling Field, District of Columbia, 15 February 1946
- Greenville Army Air Base, South Carolina, August-27 August 1946
- Smyrna Air Force Base (later Sewart Air Force Base), Tennessee, 17 October 1949 – 27 August 1950
- Ashiya Air Base, Japan, 4 September 1950 – 15 November 1954
- Sewart Air Force Base, Tennessee, 15 November 1954 (deployed to Évreux-Fauville Air Base, France, 6 June–August 1961; Clark Air Base, Philippines, 19 May-29 Jul 1962, 5 August–October 1964, March–May 1965; RAF Mildenhall, England, 15 December 1967-c. 28 March 1968, 1 July-2 Oct 1968, and 16 November 1969 – 11 January 1970)
- Little Rock Air Force Base, Arkansas, 9 March 1970 – present (deployed to RAF Mildenhall, England, 3 July-30 August 1970; Rhein-Main Air Base, Germany, 2 April-31 May 1971

=== Aircraft ===
- Douglas C-47 Skytrain (1943–1946)
- Fairchild C-82 Packet (1949–1950)
- Fairchild C-119 Flying Boxcar (1950–1957)
- Lockheed C-130 Hercules (1956 – 2017)
- Lockheed C-130J Super Hercules (2017 – Present)
