= 314th Operations Group =

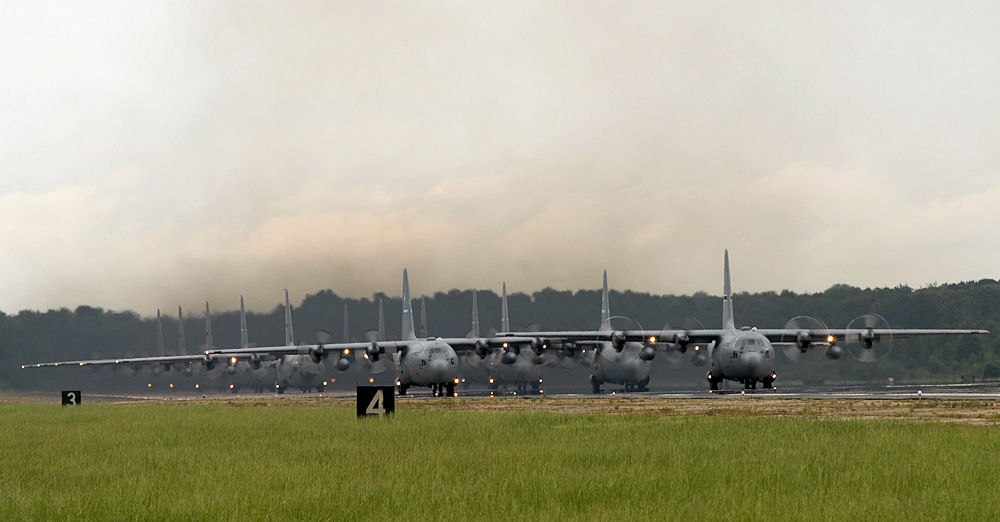
- C-130 Hercules lined up for takeoff at Little Rock Air Force Base
- Active: 1942–1957; 1978–1980; 1991–present
- Country: United States
- Branch: United States Air Force
- Part of: 314th Airlift Wing
- Motto(s): Viri Veniente Latin, Men Will Come (1942–1954)
- Engagements: European theater of World War II Mediterranean Theater of Operations Korean War
- Decorations: Distinguished Unit Citation; Air Force Outstanding Unit Award; Republic of Korea Presidential Unit Citation

Insignia
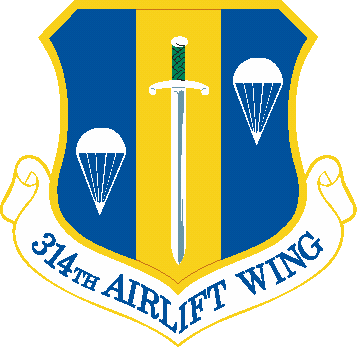
- 314th Operations Group emblem (Approved 17 June 1954)

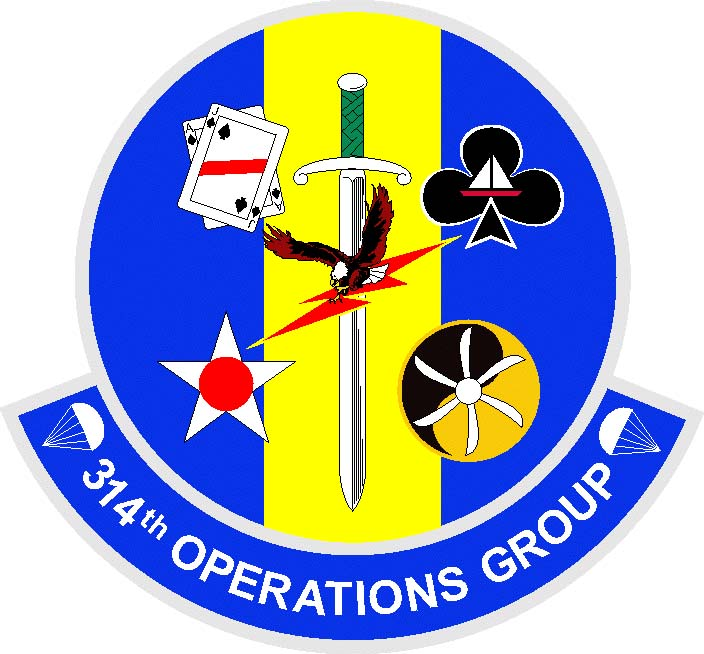
- 314th Operations Group gaggle patch

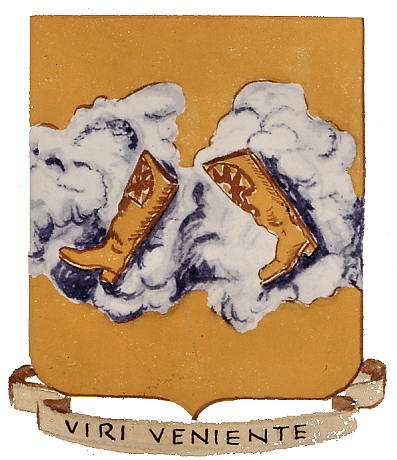
- 314th Troop Carrier Group emblem (Approved 17 August 1942)

The 314th Operations Group (314 OG) is the flying component of the Air Education and Training Command 314th Airlift Wing, stationed at Little Rock Air Force Base, Arkansas.

== Overview ==
The group provides C-130 initial and tactical aircrew training in all crew positions for all of the Department of Defense and allied students from 46 nations.

== Units ==
The 314th Operations Group is composed of one flying squadron and one training squadron.

- The 62nd Airlift Squadron flies the C-130J Super Hercules
- The 714th Training Squadron provided administrative support for all students

== History ==
See the 314th Airlift Wing for additional history and lineage

=== World War II ===
During World War II the 314th Troop Carrier Group arrived in the Mediterranean Theater of Operations in May 1943, taking part with Twelfth Air Force units in two airborne operations. It flew two major night missions in July 1943 during the Sicily invasion, dropping paratroops of 82d Airborne Division near Gela on 9 July and reinforcements to the area on the 11th.

Later in the year, the group transported paratroops and supplies to Salerno, 14 and 15 September, during the invasion of Italy. Squadrons from the 314th flew additional missions in the Mediterranean before it transferred, in February 1944, to England for further training.

From England, it took part with the Ninth Air Force in the Normandy invasion, flying numerous supply and reinforcement missions in the ensuing period. The 314th dropped paratroops over the Netherlands in September and carried munitions and supplies to the same area. After moving to France in late February 1945, it participated in the airborne crossings of the Rhine River near Wesel on 24 March. The group then brought supplies and equipment to combat units and airlifted wounded U.S. and Allied personnel to rear-area hospitals.

After the termination of hostilities, it evacuated prisoners of war from German camps and flew regular personnel and freight service. It transferred without personnel or equipment (WOPE) to the United States in February 1946, and in September again transferred WOPE, to the Panama Canal Zone, where the 314th operated air terminals under Caribbean Air Command. It moved back to the United States in October 1948 for further training.

=== Cold War ===
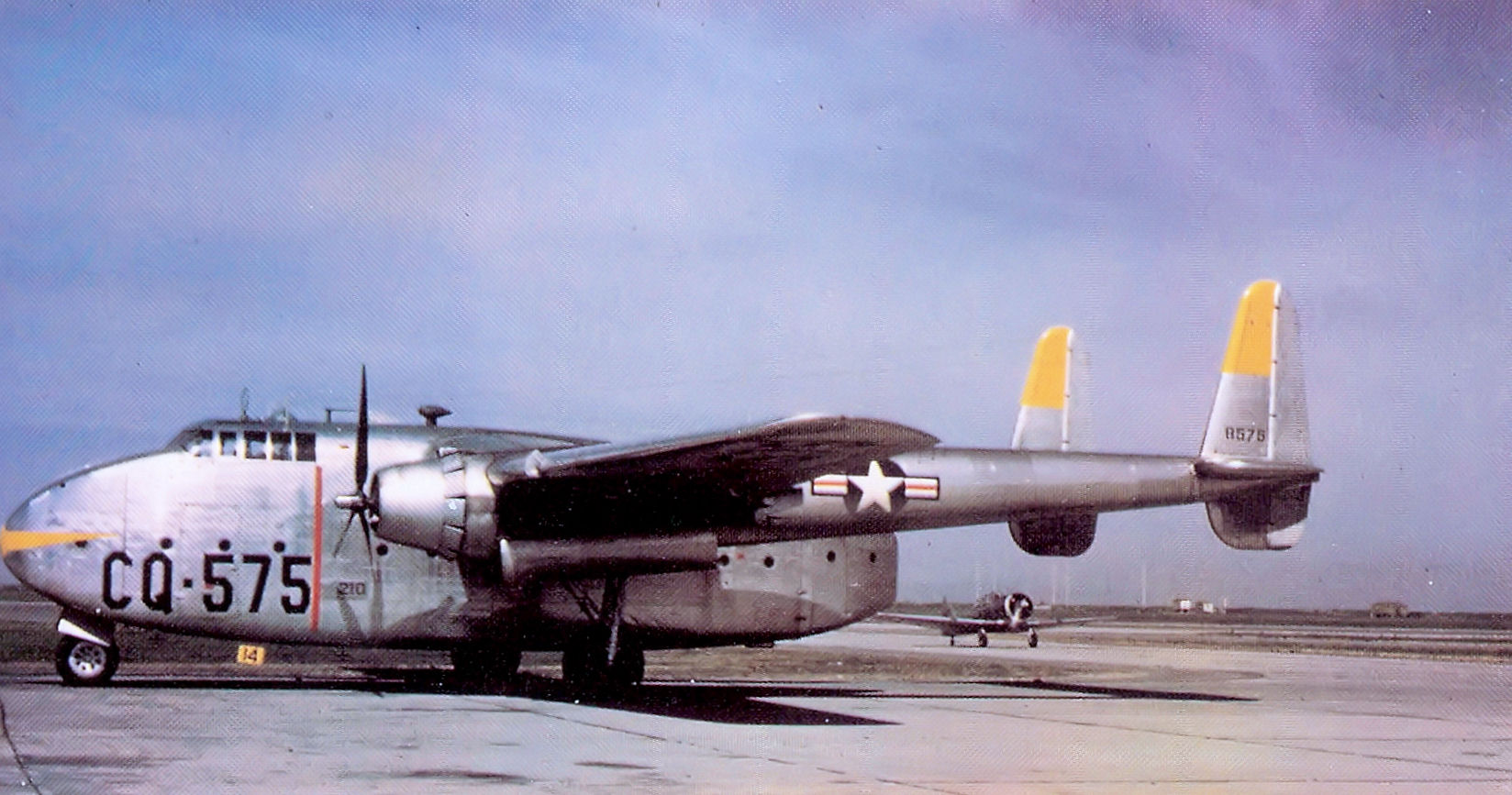
314th TCG Fairchild C-82A Packet Ashiya AB, Japan 48-575

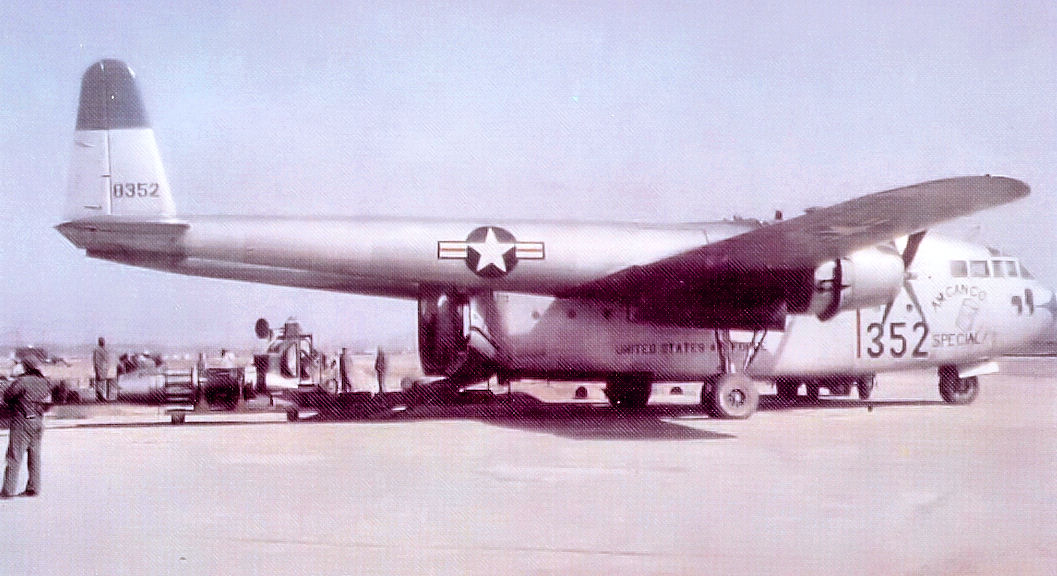
314th TCG Fairchild C-119B Flying Boxcar 48-352 operating from a base in South Korea, 1953

Transferring without personnel or equipment (WOPE) to US in February 1946, and in Sep, again WOPE, to the Canal Zone, the 314th operated air terminals under Caribbean Air Command. It moved back to the US in October 1948 for further training.

The group served in Japan during the Korean War, participating in two major airborne operations, at Sunchon in October 1950 and at Munsan-ni in March 1951. It later transported supplies to Korea and evacuated prisoners of war. In 1954, it again transferred, without personnel or equipment to the US where it participated in a continuous stream of tactical exercises and inspections until October 1957.

=== Modern era ===
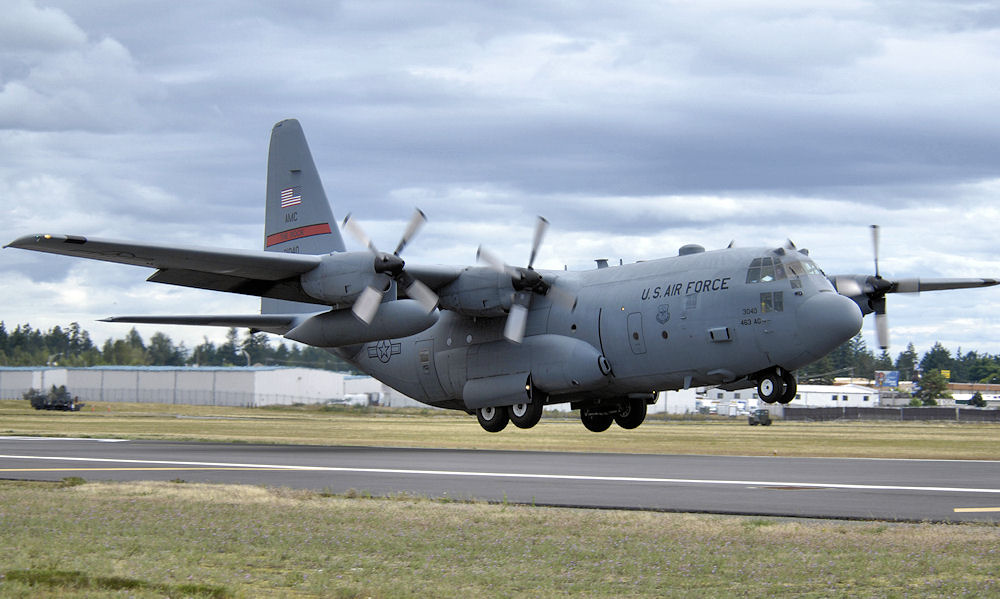
Lockheed C-130K Hercules 65-13040 taking off

The group flew worldwide airlift and provided all C-130 aircrew training to U.S. and allied aircrews, September 1978 – June 1980 and from December 1991 to present.

== Lineage ==
- Established as the 314th Transport Group on 28 January 1942

Activated on 2 March 1942
Redesignated: 314th Troop Carrier Group on 4 July 1942
Redesignated: 314th Troop Carrier Group, Heavy on 26 July 1948
Redesignated: 314th Troop Carrier Group, Medium on 19 November 1948
Inactivated on 8 October 1957

- Redesignated 314th Tactical Airlift Group on 24 August 1978

Activated on 15 September 1978
Inactivated on 15 June 1980

- Redesignated 314th Operations Group and activated on 1 December 1991

=== Assignments ===
- 50th Transport Wing, 2 March 1942
- 52d Transport Wing, 15 June 1942
- 53d Troop Carrier Wing, 30 August 1942
- 50th Troop Carrier Wing, 3 November 1942
- 52d Troop Carrier Wing, 20 February 1943
- IX Air Force Service Command, 20 May 1945
- 302d Transport Wing, 11 August 1945
- European Air Transport Service (Provisional), 3 September 1945
- United States Air Forces in European Theater, 31 December 1945
- Eighteenth Air Force, 15 February 1946
- Strategic Air Command, 21 March 1946
- Third Air Force, 25 July 1946
- Caribbean Air Command, 9 September 1946
- Panama Air Depot, 10 March 1948
- 5700 Wing, Caribbean Air Command, 26 July 1948
- Ninth Air Force, 21 October 1948
- 314th Troop Carrier Wing, 1 November 1948 – 8 October 1957

Attached to Far East Air Forces, 7 September 1950
Attached to FEAF Combat Cargo Command, 10 September 1950
Attached to 314th Air Division, 1 December 1950
Attached to 315th Air Division, 25 January 1951 – c. 1 November 1952
Attached to 483d Troop Carrier Wing, 1 January 1953 – 15 November 1954

- 314th Tactical Airlift Wing, 15 September 1978 – 15 June 1980
- 314th Airlift Wing, 1 December 1991 – present

=== Components ===
- 16th Airlift Squadron: 1 December 1991 – 1 October 1993
- 20th Troop Carrier Squadron: 17 June 1948 – 20 October 1949
- 30th Transport Squadron: 2 March – 14 June 1942
- 31st Transport Squadron: 2 March – 16 June 1942
- 32d Transport (later, 32d Troop Carrier; 32d Tactical Airlift) Squadron (S2): 2 March 1942 – 18 September 1945; 1 November 1978 – 30 June 1979
- 34th Combat Airlift Training Squadron (later, Combat Aerial Delivery School; USAF Combat Aerial Delivery School): 1 December 1991–present
- 45th Airlift Squadron: 1 October 1999 – 15 July 2011
- 48th Airlift Squadron: 1 December 2003 – present
- 50th Troop Carrier (later, 50th Tactical Airlift; 50th Airlift) Squadron (2R): 15 June 1942 – 27 May 1946; 17 October 1949 – 8 October 1957; 1 November 1978 – 15 June 1980; 1 December 1991 – 1 April 1997
- 53d Airlift Squadron: 1 October 1993 – 11 January 2008
- 61st Troop Carrier (later, 61st Tactical Airlift; 61st Airlift) Squadron (Q9): attached, 26 October 1942, assigned 15 March 1942-c. December 1945 (detached October–December 1945); assigned 17 October 1949 – 8 October 1957 (detached 1 October 1951-c. 1 November 1954); assigned 1 November 1978 – 15 June 1980; 1 December 1991 – 1 April 1997
- 62d Troop Carrier (later, 62d Tactical Airlift, 62d Airlift) Squadron (E5): 15 March 1943-c. October 1946; 6 December 1945 – 15 February 1946; 17 October 1949 – 8 October 1957; 1 December 1991–present
- 301st Troop Carrier Squadron: attached 15 February – 27 May 1946
- 302d Troop Carrier Squadron: 15 May – 7 August 1945; 15 October 1945 – 27 May 1946
- 321st Troop Carrier Squadron: attached 16 October 1945 – 5 December 1945; assigned 6 December 1945 – 27 August 1946; 8 June 1955 – 1 August 1957
- 323d Troop Carrier Squadron: 16 October 1945 – 30 September 1946
- 334th Troop Carrier Squadron: 15 October 1946 – 20 October 1949.

=== Stations ===
- Drew Field, Florida, 1 March 1942
- Bowman Field, Kentucky, 24 June 1942
- Sedalia Army Air Field, Missouri, 4 November 1942
- Lawson Field, Georgia, 19 February-4 May 1943
- Berguent Airfield, French Morocco, 20 May 1943
- Kairouan Airfield, Tunisia, 26 June 1943
- Castelvetrano Airfield, Sicily, 1 September 1943 – 13 February 1944
- RAF Saltby (Station 538), England, 20 February 1944 – 28 February 1945
- Poix Airfield (B-44), France, 4 March 1945
- Villacoublay Airfield (Station 180, A-42), France, 15 October 1945 – 15 February 1946
- Bolling Field, District of Columbia, 15 February-9 September 1946
- Albrook Field, Panama Canal Zone, 9 September 1946
- Curundu Heights, Panama Canal Zone, 10 March–October 1948
- Smyrna Air Force Base (later Sewart Air Force Base, Tennessee, 21 October 1948
- Laurinburg-Maxton Airport, North Carolina, 19 April 1950
- Sewart Air Force Base, Tennessee, 5 May-1 September 1950
- Ashiya Air Base, Japan, 7 September 1950 – 15 November 1954
- Sewart Air Force Base, Tennessee, 15 November 1954 – 8 October 1957
- Little Rock Air Force Base, Arkansas, 15 September 1978 – 15 June 1980
- Little Rock Air Force Base, Arkansas, 1 December 1991–present

=== Aircraft assigned ===
- Douglas C-47 Skytrain, 1942–1946
- Douglas C-53 Skytrooper, 1942–1943
- Douglas C-54 Skymaster, 1947–1948
- Fairchild C-82 Packet, 1949–1950
- Fairchild C-119 Flying Boxcar, 1950–1957
- Lockheed C-130 Hercules, 1978–1980; 1991–present
- Learjet C-21, 1999–2011
