= 314th Airlift Wing =

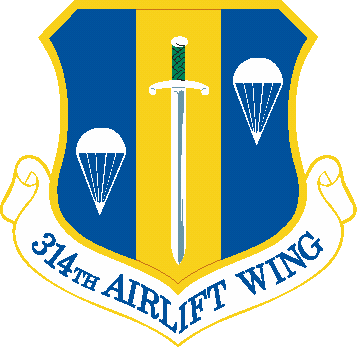
314th Airlift Wing

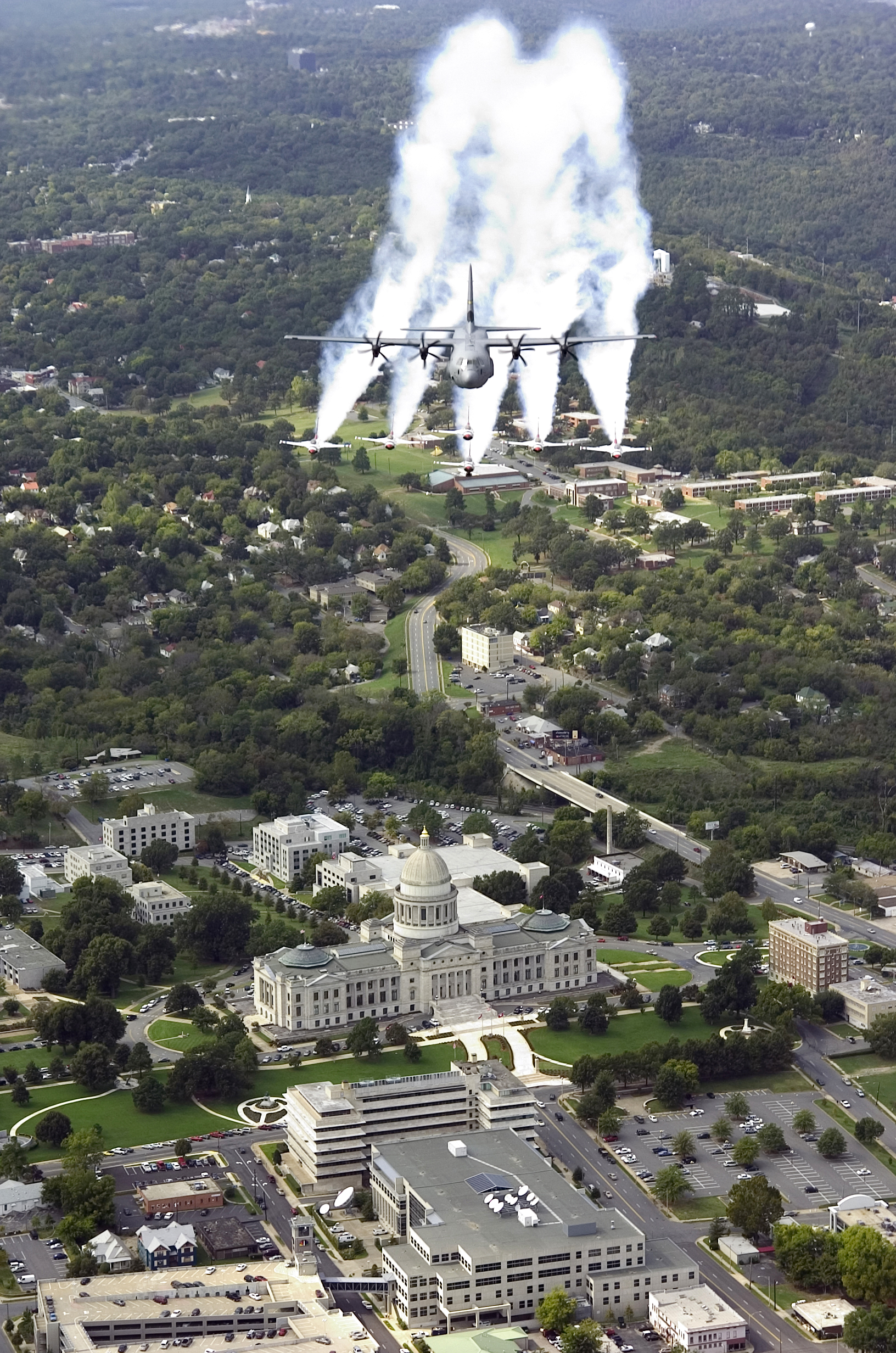
- 314th AW C-130J with the Thunderbirds in formation flight over Little Rock
- Active: 1948–present
- Country: United States
- Branch: United States Air Force
- Role: Airlift training
- Part of: Air Education and Training Command
- Garrison/HQ: Little Rock Air Force Base
- Motto: “Home of Herk Nation”
- Decorations: Air Force Outstanding Unit Award with Combat V Device; Air Force Outstanding Unit Award

Commanders
- Current commander: Col. Nancy Taylor
- Command Chief: CCM Ben Davis
- Notable commanders: Alfred G. Hansen; Thomas S. Power; Adriel N. Williams

Insignia
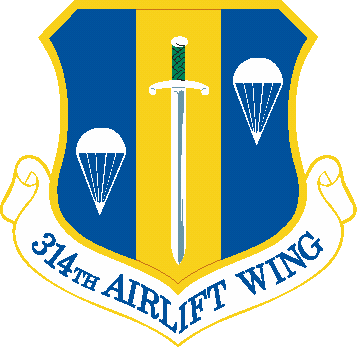
- 314th Airlift Wing emblem (Approved 12 February 1995)

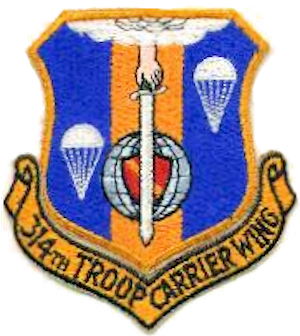
- 314th Troop Carrier Wing emblem (Approved 17 June 1954)

The 314th Airlift Wing (314 AW) is a wing of the United States Air Force based at Little Rock Air Force Base in Little Rock, Arkansas. Its mission is to conduct Lockheed C-130 Hercules combat airlift training.

As a wing, the 314th emerged as in November 1948 as the 314th Troop Carrier Wing at Smyrna Air Force Base, Tennessee, but traces earlier history to the creation of the 314th Troop Carrier Group in 1942.

== Subordinate units ==
- 314th Operations Group

62d Airlift Squadron (62 AS) - C-130J
714th Training Squadron (714 TRS)

- 314th Maintenance Group

314th Maintenance Squadron
314th Aircraft Maintenance Squadron
314th Maintenance Operations Squadron

== History ==
See the 314th Operations Group for related history and lineage

The 314th Troop Carrier Group arrived in the Mediterranean in May 1943, taking part with Twelfth Air Force units in two airborne operations. It flew two major night missions in July 1943 during the Sicily invasion, dropping paratroops of 82d Airborne Division near Gela on 9 July and reinforcements to the area on the 11 July. Later in the year, the group transported paratroops and supplies to Salerno, 14 and 15 September, during the invasion of Italy. Squadrons from the 314th flew additional missions in the Mediterranean before it transferred, in February 1944, to England for further training. From there, it took part with the Ninth Air Force in the Normandy invasion, flying numerous supply and reinforcement missions in the ensuing period. The 314th dropped paratroops over Holland in September and carried munitions and supplies to the same area. After moving to France in late February 1945, it participated in the airborne crossings of the Rhine River near Wesel on 24 March. The group then brought supplies and equipment to combat units and airlifted wounded U.S. and Allied personnel to rear-area hospitals.

After the war ended, it evacuated prisoners of war from German camps and flew regular personnel and freight service. Transferring without personnel or equipment (WOPE) to U.S. in February 1946, and in September, again transferred WOPE, to the Panama Canal Zone, where the 314th operated air terminals under Caribbean Air Command. It moved back to the U.S. in October 1948 for further training.

=== Korean War ===
The wing was activated in November 1948 as the 314th Troop Carrier Wing at Smyrna Air Force Base, Tennessee.

The wing served in Japan during the Korean War, participating in two major airborne operations, at Sunchon in October 1950 and at Munsan-ni in March 1951. It later transported supplies to Korea and evacuated prisoners of war.

=== Early Cold War and Vietnam War periods ===
The wing was transferred without personnel or equipment back to the U.S. in 1954. There it served as a primary troop carrier unit in the eastern U.S., participating in joint airborne training with Army forces, developing assault airlift operations, and performing in aerial demonstrations, exercises, maneuvers, and joint operations. Between January 1966 and May 1971, it operated from Ching Chuan Kang Air Base Taiwan as part of the 315th Air Division to provide passenger and cargo airlift throughout the Far East and combat airlift in Southeast Asia during the Vietnam War period.

=== Later Cold War period ===
Again returning to the U.S. in May 1971, the 314th acquired the assets of the inactivated 64th Tactical Airlift Wing and incurred host organization responsibilities of Little Rock Air Force Base, Arkansas. It has since operated C-130 training schools, providing classroom instruction and flying training to all branches of the U.S. military and allied nations and served as a tactical airlift wing involved in worldwide airborne training, airlift, and special operations including deployments in support of the Commander-in-Chief, United States Air Forces in Europe. It also provided joint airborne communications center and command post support for the United States Readiness Command. In October 1983, the wing provided Joint Airborne Communications Center/Command Post equipment in support of the rescue of U.S. nationals in Grenada. During December 1989 and January 1990, it provided airlift support during the intervention in Operation Just Cause in Panama.

=== Post Cold War period ===
The 314th conducted airlift control support in addition to airlift of troops and equipment to the Middle East in support of the liberation of Kuwait, August 1990 – March 1991.

From 1991 to present, in addition to its primary mission of aircrew training, the wing conducted numerous disaster relief and humanitarian support missions including airdrop of U.S. Army Troops; humanitarian aid; emergency supplies; and medical evacuations in addition to airlifting passengers and equipment.

=== Operations ===
- Korean War
- Operation Urgent Fury
- Operation Just Cause
- Operation Desert Shield
- Operation Desert Storm

== Lineage ==
- Established as the 314th Troop Carrier Wing, Medium on 4 October 1948

Activated on 1 November 1948

- Redesignated 314th Troop Carrier Wing on 1 January 1967
- Redesignated 314th Tactical Airlift Wing on 1 August 1967
- Redesignated 314th Airlift Wing on 1 December 1991

=== Assignments ===
- Ninth Air Force, 1 November 1948
- Fourteenth Air Force, 1 February 1949
- Tactical Air Command, 1 August 1950
- Eighteenth Air Force, 1 June 1951
- Ninth Air Force, 1 September 1957
- 839th Air Division, 8 October 1957 (attached to 315th Air Division after 22 January 1966)
- 315th Air Division, 27 January 1966
- 327th Air Division, 1 November 1968
- Twelfth Air Force, 31 May 1971
- 834th Air Division, 15 March 1972
- Twenty-Second Air Force, 31 December 1974
- Fifteenth Air Force, 1 July 1993
- Eighth Air Force, 1 October 1993
- Nineteenth Air Force, 1 April 1997
- Air Education and Training Command, 12 July 2012
- Nineteenth Air Force, 1 October 2014 – present

=== Components ===
Groups

- 34th Tactical Airlift Training Group: 15 September 1978 – 1 December 1991
- 309th Troop Carrier Group: (attached 26 June 1949 – 20 February 1951 – Recerve Corollary Unit)
- 313th Troop Carrier Group (attached 1 October 1953 – 8 June 1955)
- 314th Air Base Group (later 314th Combat Support Group, 314th Support Group, 314th Mission Support Group): 1 November 1948 – 8 October 1957, 1 October 1964 – 1 December 1965, 1 May 1971 – present
- 314th Maintenance and Supply Group (later 314th Logistics Group, 314th Maintenance Group): 1 November 1948 – 8 October 1957, 1 December 1991 – present
- 314th Medical Group (see 314th Station Medical Group and USAF Hospital, Little Rock)
- 314th Station Medical Group (later 314th Medical Group, 314th Tactical Infirmary, 314th Tactical Hospital): 1 November 1948 – 8 October 1957, 1 May 1971 – 1 March 1975
- 314th Troop Carrier Group (later 314th Tactical Airlift Group, 314th Operations Group: 1 November 1948 – 8 October 1957, 15 September 1978 – 15 June 1980, 1 December 1991 – present

Attached to Far East Air Forces, 7 September 1950, FEAF Combat Cargo Command, 10 September 1950, 314th Air Division, 1 December 1950, 315th Air Division, 25 January 1951 – c. 1 November 1952; attached to 483d Troop Carrier Wing, 1 January 1953 – 15 November 1954)

- 316th Troop Carrier Group: 4 November 1949 – 14 November 1954
- 513th Troop Carrier Group: (attached 8 November 1955 – 8 October 1957)
- 516th Troop Carrier Group: (attached 8 May 1955 – 9 July 1956)

Hospital

- USAF Hospital, Little Rock (later 314th Medical Group); 1 April 1971 – present

=== Stations ===
- Smyrna Air Force Base (later Sewart Air Force Base), 1 November 1958 – c. 15 January 1966
- Ching Chuan Kang Air Base, Taiwan, 22 January 1966
- Little Rock Air Force Base, Arkansas, 31 May 1971 – present

=== Aircraft operated ===
- Douglas C-47 Skytrain (1948–1953)
- Fairchild C-82 Packet (1948–1951)
- Waco CG-15 (glider) (1949–1951)
- Chase YG-18 (glider) (1949–1951)
- Fairchild C-119 Flying Boxcar (1949–1951)
- Douglas C-54 Skymaster (1949–1951, 1954–1955)
- Curtiss C-46 Commando (1952)
- Curtiss TC-46 Commando (1950)
- Chase YC-122 Avitruc(1950–1954)
- YH-12 (1951)
- Sikorsky H-19 Chickasaw (1952–1955)
- L-5 Sentinel (1952–1953)
- Aeronca L-16 (1952–1953)
- De Havilland Canada L-20 Beaver (1952–1954)
- Piasecki H-21 (1955–1959)
- Fairchild C-123 Provider (1956–1961)
- Lockheed C-130 Hercules (1956 – present)
- Lockheed DC-130 Hercules (1979–1981)
- Learjet C-21 (1999–2011)

== Unit emblems ==
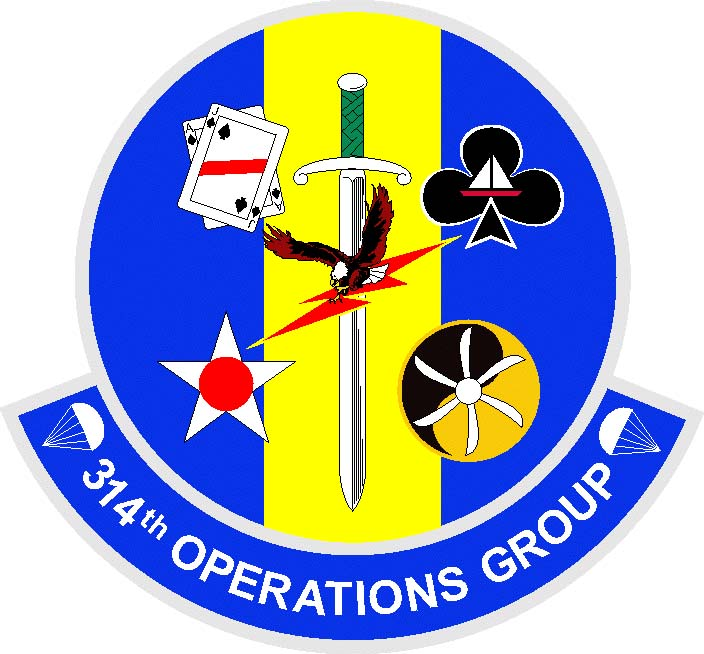
314 OG

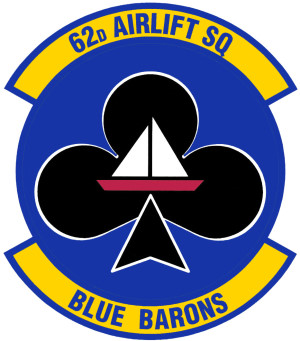
62 AS

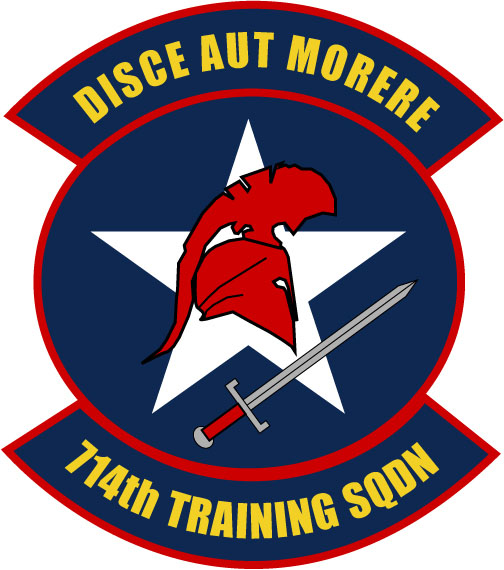
714 TRS

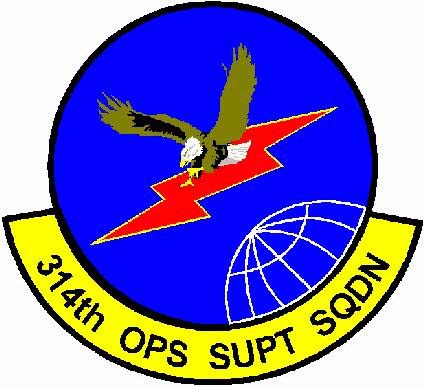
314 OSS

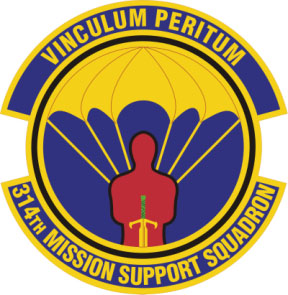
314 MSS
