= Berguent Airfield =

Moroccan miliary airfield

Berguent Airfield
- Part of Twelfth Air Force

Site information
- Type: Military Airfield
- Controlled by: United States Army Air Forces

Location
- Coordinates: 34°02′38.07″N 002°00′05.03″W

Site history
- Built: Early 1943
- In use: May–June 1943
- Battles/wars: North African Campaign

Location of Berguent Airfield, French Morocco

Berguent Airfield is an abandoned military airfield in Morocco, located approximately 33 km south-southeast of Jerada (Oriental); 500 km east-northeast of Casablanca, near the Algerian border.

== History ==
During World War II the airfield's primary use was for C-47 Skytrain troop carrier and logistics operations by the Twelfth Air Force. The airfield was constructed as a temporary facility, with a hard earth or pierced steel planking (PSP) runway and parking apron. with few or no permanent structures, Tents were used for ground support operations and personnel billeting.

Elements of the 314th Troop Carrier Group began to arrive on 4 May 1943 and operated from the airfield until the end of June 1943, during the North African Campaign. After the 314th moved east to Kairouan Airfield, Tunisia, the airfield was dismantled and the land returned to civil authorities.

There are faint traces of the airfield in the runway which can be seen in aerial photography
