= Castelvetrano Airfield =

World War II military airfield in Sicily

Castelvetrano Airfield
- Part of Twelfth Air Force
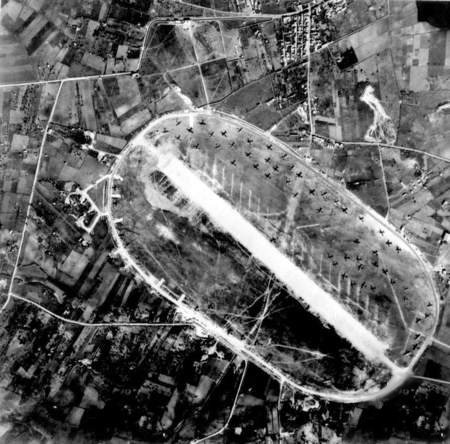

Site information
- Type: Military Airfield
- Controlled by: Regia Aeronautica; United States Army Air Forces

Location
- Coordinates: 37°40′23.97″N 012°46′29.28″E

Site history
- Built: 1930s
- In use: 1944

Location of Castelvetrano Airfield, Italy

Castelvetrano Airfield is a decommissioned World War II military airfield in Sicily which is located approximately 1 kilometre (0.6 mi) southwest of Castelvetrano. The airfield had been an Italian Air Force (Regia Aeronautica), seized by the United States Army during the Invasion of Sicily (Operation Husky), and used as part of Sicilian Campaign and the Allied Invasion of Italy in 1943.

== History ==
When the Axis Forces were driven out of Cyrenaica during Operation Crusader in December 1941, they could no longer fly in supplies from Crete to Derna. Instead, the Regia Aeronautica and German Luftwaffe began flying transport missions from airfields in Sicily, including Castelvetrano. On 4 January 1942 Castelvetrano was attacked by a force of Royal Air Force Blenheim IV bombers flying from Luqa airfield on Malta, which caught 75 aircraft 'parked wing-tip to wing-tip ... the airfield was left a smoking ruin'. That night Wellington IC bombers from Luqa added to the damage.

After its capture the airfield was primarily used by the United States Army Air Force Twelfth Air Force units:

- 81st Fighter Group, 12 October - February 1944, P-39 Airacobra
- 314th Troop Carrier Group, September 1943-February 1944, C-47 Skytrain

When the Americans moved out, the airfield was closed and dismantled. Today, the main runway of the airfield is clearly visible in aerial photography but no structures of other components of the airfield remain.
