= Kairouan Airfield =

Abandoned World War II military airfield in Tunisia

Kairouan Airfield

Site information
- Type: Military airfield
- Controlled by: United States Army Air Forces

Location
- Coordinates: 35°34′47.50″N 010°07′34.66″E

Site history
- Built: 1943
- In use: 1943

Location of Kairouan Airfield, Tunisia

Kairouan Airfield is an abandoned military airfield in Tunisia, located approximately 11 km south-southeast of Kairouan, and 126 km south of Tunis. It was a major Troop Carrier unit base of the United States Army Air Force Twelfth Air Force during the North African Campaign. The units known to be assigned to the base were:

- 52d Troop Carrier Wing, July–September 1943
- 61st Troop Carrier Group, 21 June-1 September 1943, C-47 Skytrain
- 64th Troop Carrier Group, 28 June-26 July 1943, C-47 Skytrain
- 313th Troop Carrier Group, 16 June-23 August 1943, C-47 Skytrain
- 314th Troop Carrier Group, 26 June-1 September 1943, C-47 Skytrain

From Kairouan, Operation Ladbroke, the British glider landing near Syracuse, Sicily. took place on the night of 9 July 1943 as part of the invasion of Sicily. On the night of 9/10 July 1943 a force of 144 Waco gliders, towed by US C-47, and British Handley Page Halifax and Albemarle tug aircraft, took off to take part in Operation Ladbroke – the first Allied attempt at a mass glider landing in World War II. The plan was to place a large invasion force on the ground near the town of Syracuse, secure the Ponte Grande Bridge and then take control of the city itself, including its strategically vital docks, as a prelude to the full-scale invasion of Sicily.

In addition, the Ninth Air Force 324th Fighter Group used the airfield in June 1943, flying P-40 Warhawks from the airfield.

By the end of September 1943, the C-47 groups had moved to Sicily and Kairouan was dismantled and abandoned. Today, one (possibly two) main runways can be seen in aerial photography, along with traces of taxiways and dispersal pads.
