= 35th Flying Training Squadron =

35th Flying Training Squadron

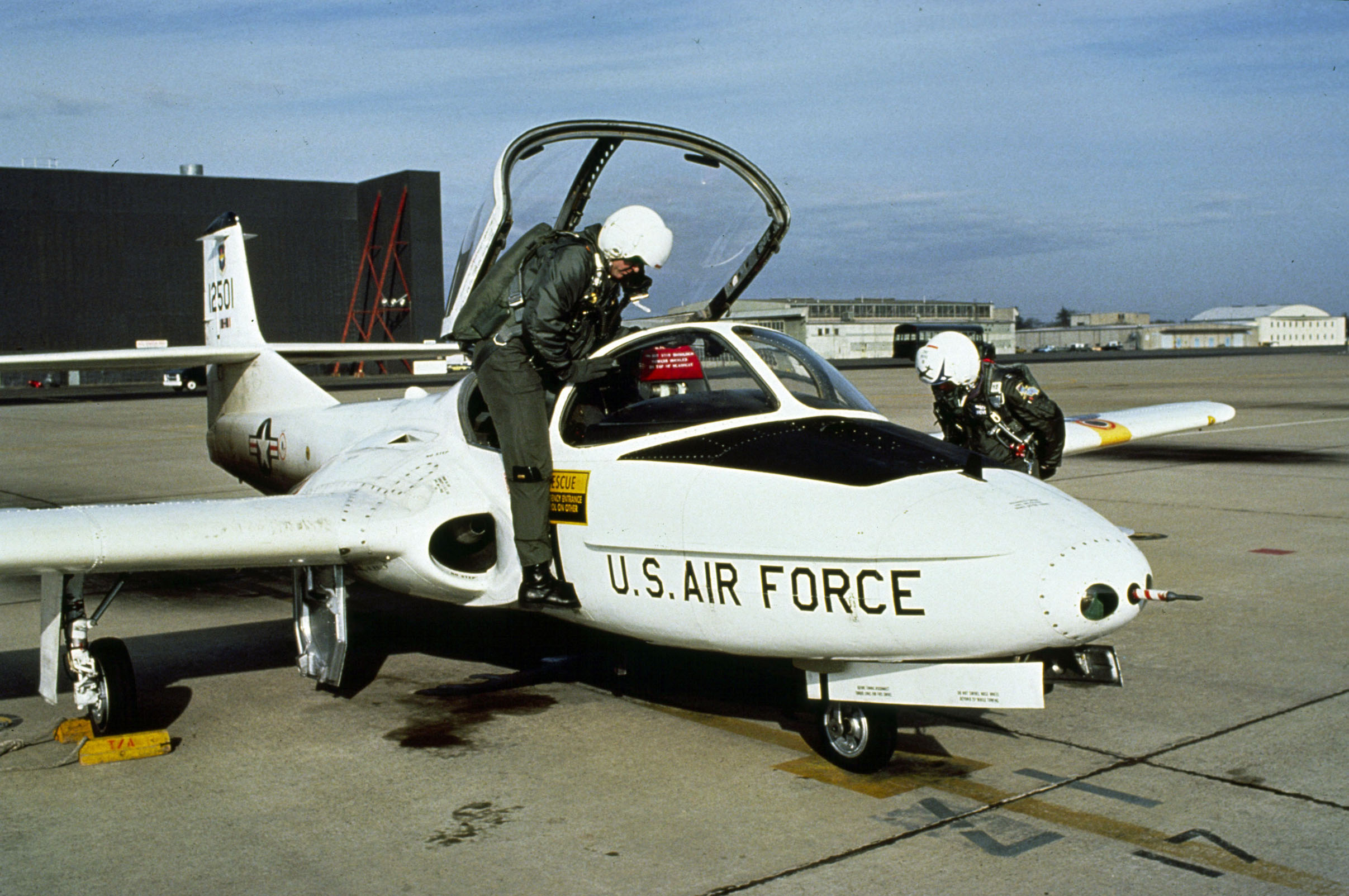
- T-37 as flown by the squadron
- Active: 1942–1945; 1952–1954; 1963–1971; 1972–1996
- Country: United States
- Branch: United States Air Force
- Role: Flying training
- Engagements: European Theater of Operations; Mediterranean Theater of Operations; China-Burma-India Theater; Vietnam War
- Decorations: Distinguished Unit Citation; Air Force Outstanding Unit Award

Insignia
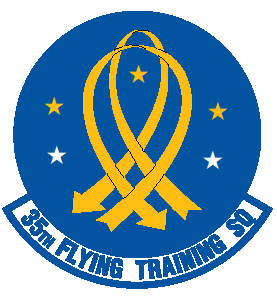
- 35th Flying Training Squadron emblem (approved 20 February 1973) (Note: Description: Azure, two ribbons barbed, each arcing from base doubled in chief braced and arcing back to base Or, between five mullets one, two, Or, and two Argent)

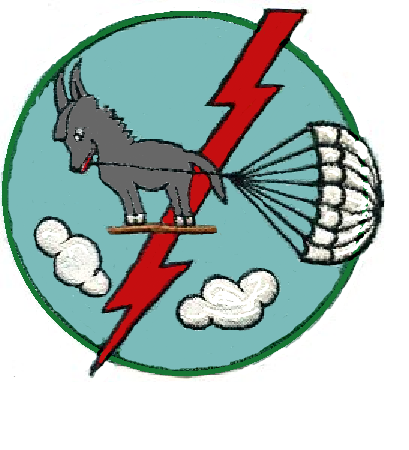
- 35th Troop Carrier Squadron emblem (approved 15 July 1954) (Note: Description: On a disc light sky blue, border green, over the disc a lightning bolt re, point downward, between two sylized clouds white in base; the bold surmounted by a caricatured US mule, dark gray, riding a paradrop platform and pulling forward a drag chute, shades of white; the mule, platform and parachute outlined dark gray.)

The 35th Flying Training Squadron was a United States Air Force unit, last assigned to the 64th Operations Group at Reese Air Force Base, Texas. The squadron was inactivated in 1996 as the 64th Flying Training Wing began drawing down in preparation for the closing of Reese the following year. The squadron had performed Undergraduate pilot training at Reese since 1972.

The squadron was first activated as the 64th Transport Squadron in 1942. As the 64th Troop Carrier Squadron it participated in combat in the European, Mediterranean and China-Burma-India Theaters, earning a Distinguished Unit Citation. Following VE Day, the squadron moved to Trinidad, where it was inactivated in July 9145.

== History ==
=== World War II ===
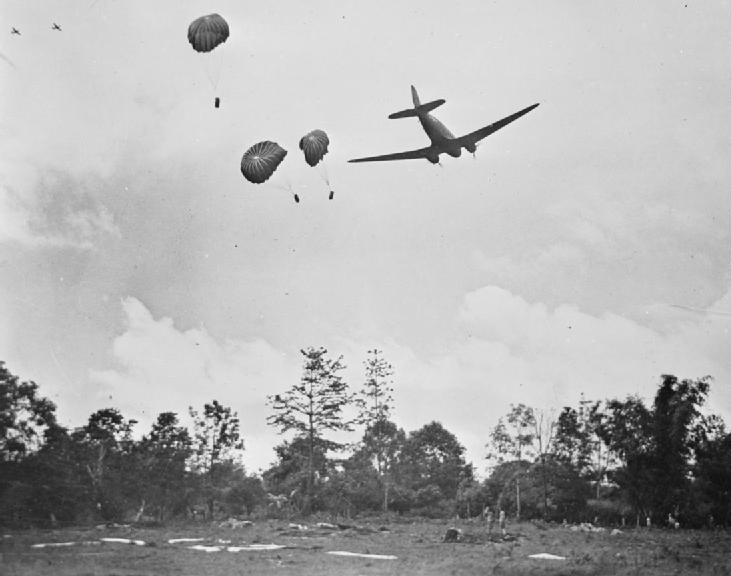
C47 releases rations near Myitkyina, Burma

The squadron was first activated in February 1942 as the 35th Transport Squadron at Olmsted Field, Pennsylvania and equipped with military models of the Douglas DC-3, primarily the C-47 Skytrain, for training. In June, the squadron moved to Westover Field, Massachusetts, where it was assigned to the 64th Transport Group and prepared for overseas movement, which occurred the following month, after it was redesignated the 35th Troop Carrier Squadron.

Upon its arrival overseas, the squadron trained with paratrooper and glider units in airborne operations for Operation Torch, the invasion of North Africa. On 10 November the air echelon flew from England via Gibraltar and on the following day landed personnel of the British 3rd Parachute Battalion at Maison Blanche (now Dar El Beïda), near Algiers. By mid-December, the squadron's ground echelon joined the air echelon at Blida Airfield, Algeria.

The group dropped paratroops to capture airfields and destroy bridges, during the battle for Tunisia; Operation Husky, the invasion of Sicily in July 1943; and Operation Avalanche, the invasion of Italy in September 1943.

In April 1944, most of the squadron was detached to India where it aided in the Allied offensive in Burma, where it earned a Distinguished Unit Citation. The squadron returned to Sicily in mid-Jun 1944. It moved to Italy the following month and participated in Operation Dragoon, the assault on southern France in August 1944, releasing gliders and paratroops. It moved to Waller Field, Trinidad without aircraft, in June 1945 and inactivated there in July 1945.

=== Cold War and War in Vietnam ===
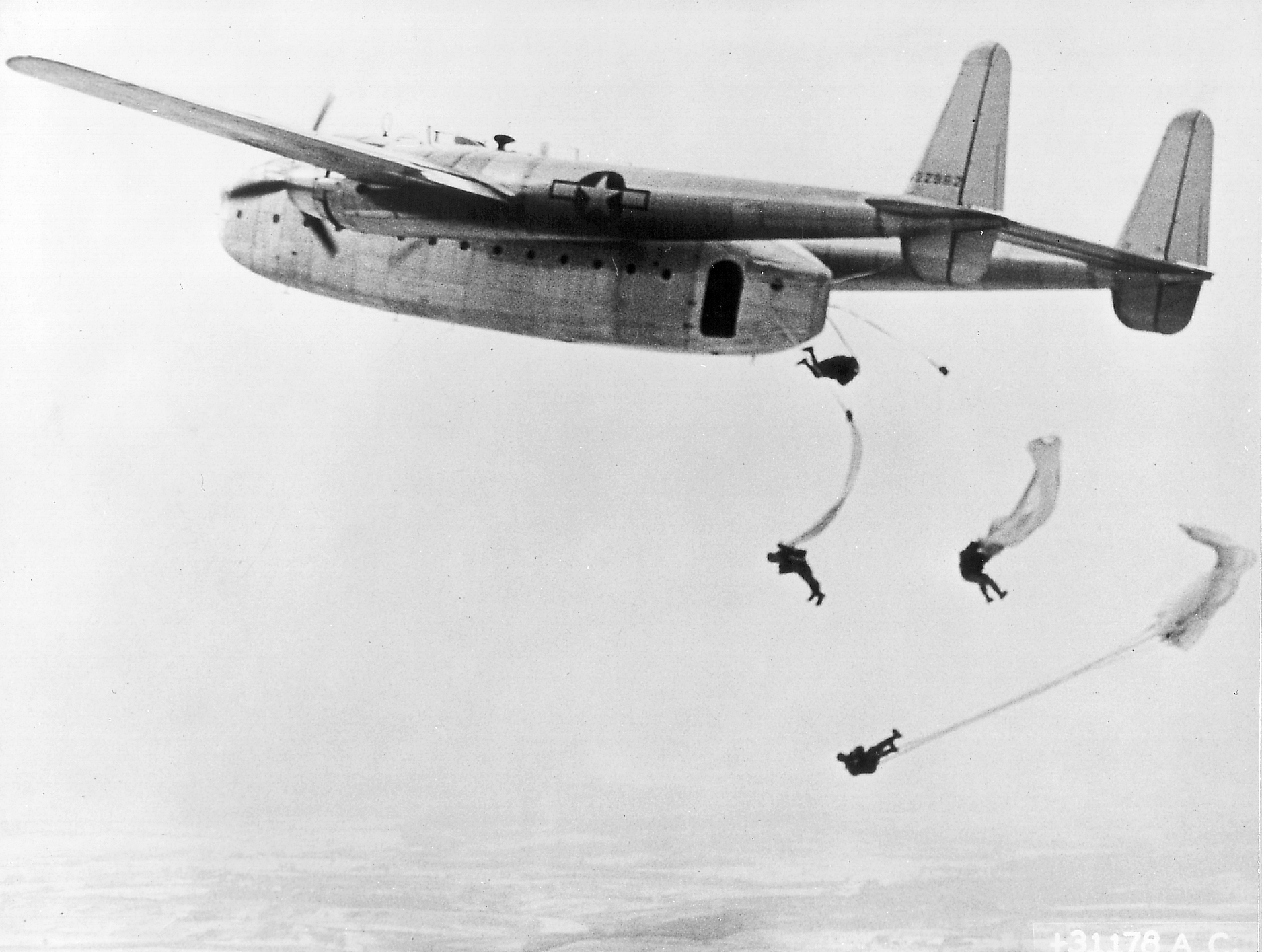
Paratroopers jump from a C-82

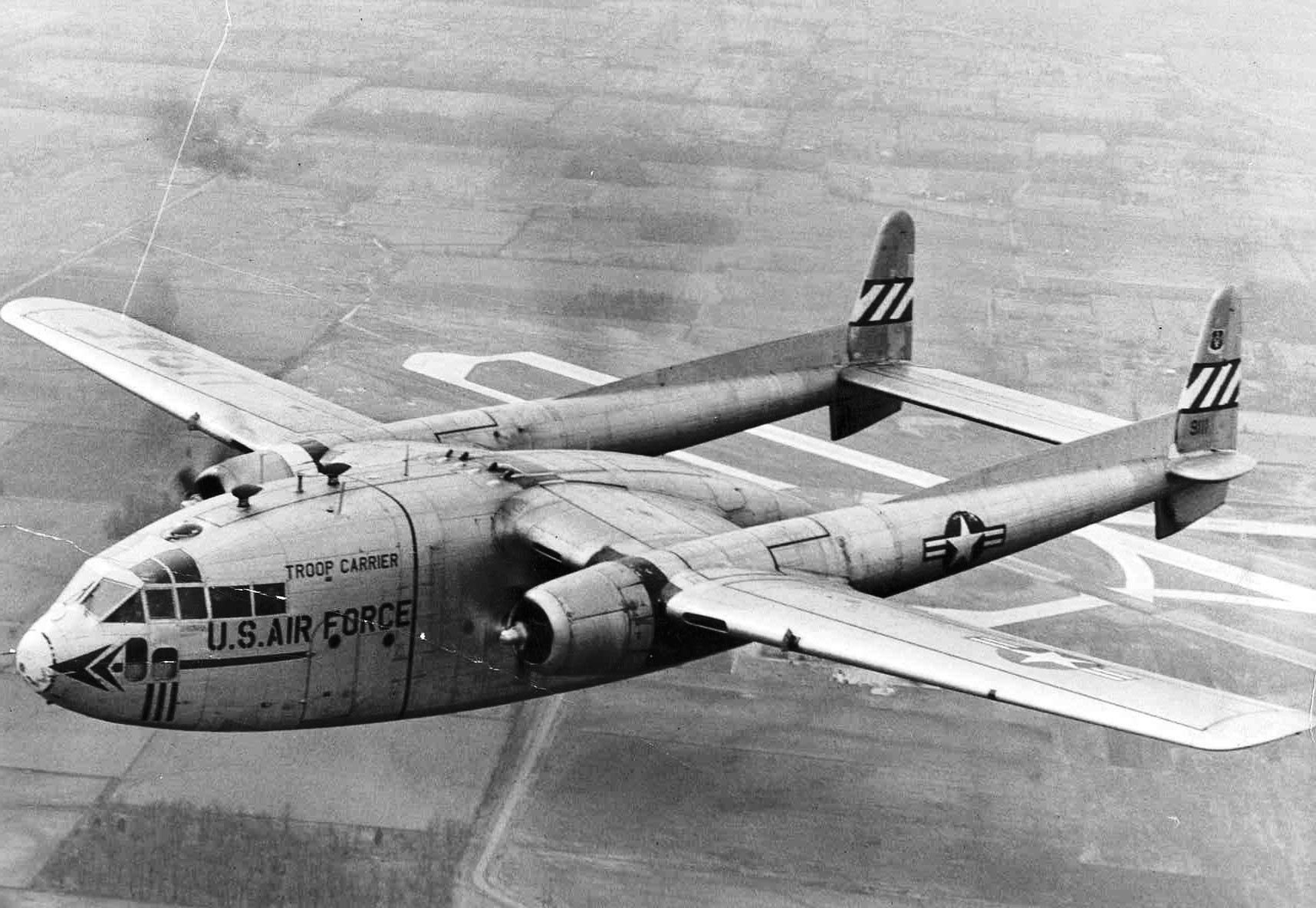
C-119 Flying Boxcar

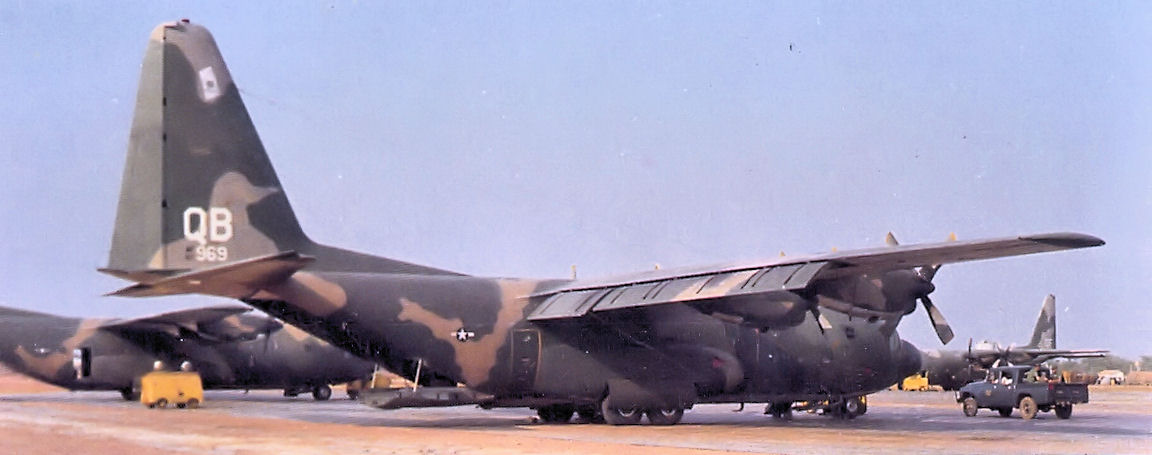
C-130 Hercules in South Vietnam

The squadron was again activated at Donaldson Air Force Base, South Carolina in July 1952, assuming the Fairchild C-82 Packets and personnel of the 57th Troop Carrier Squadron, an Air Force Reserve unit that had been called to active duty for the Korean War. In 1953, the 35th replaced its C-82s with newer Fairchild C-119 Flying Boxcars. The squadron transported personnel and equipment worldwide and participated in joint training operations with the 82nd Airborne Division until it was inactivated in July 1954.

The squadron transported cargo and personnel in the Far East and Southeast Asia, 1963–1971

=== Pilot training ===
The squadron was redesignated the 35th Flying Training Squadron and activated at Reese Air Force Base, Texas in 1972. It conducted undergraduate pilot training at Reese until it was inactivated in 1996.

== Lineage ==
- Constituted as the 35th Transport Squadron on 2 February 1942

Activated on 14 February 1942
Redesignated 35th Troop Carrier Squadron on 4 July 1942
Inactivated on 31 July 1945

- Redesignated 35th Troop Carrier Squadron, Medium on 3 July 1952

Activated on 14 July 1952
Inactivated on 21 July 1954

- Activated on 20 December 1962 (not organized)

Organized on 8 January 1963
Redesignated 35th Troop Carrier Squadron on 8 December 1965
Redesignated 35th Tactical Airlift Squadron on 1 August 1967
Inactivated on 31 March 1971

- Redesignated 35th Flying Training Squadron on 14 April 1972

Activated on 1 October 1972
Inactivated on 31 July 1996

=== Assignments ===
- 315th Transport Group, 14 February 1942
- 64th Transport Group (later 64th Troop Carrier Group), 9 June 1942 – 31 July 1945
- 64th Troop Carrier Group, 14 July 1952 – 21 July 1954
- Pacific Air Forces, 20 December 1962 (not organized)
- 315th Air Division, 8 January 1963
- 374th Troop Carrier Wing (later 374th Tactical Airlift Wing), 8 August 1966 – 31 March 1971
- 64th Flying Training Wing, 1 October 1972

64th Operations Group, 15 December 1991 – 31 July 1996

=== Stations ===
- Olmsted Field, Pennsylvania, 14 February 1942
- Westover Field, Massachusetts, 8 June – 31 July 1942
- RAF Ramsbury (Station 469), England, 18 August – c. 10 November 1942 (operated from Casablanca Airfield, French Morocco, after 14 November 1942)
- Blida Airfield, Algeria, c. 12 December 1942 (operated from Telergma Airfield, Algeria, 4 January – 21 March 1943)
- Kairouan Airfield, Tunisia, 28 June 1943
- El Djem Airfield, Tunisia, 26 July 1943
- Comiso Airfield, Sicily, 7 September 1943 (operated from bases in India, April – June 1944)
- Ciampino Airfield, Italy, 8 July 1944 (operated from Istres Air Base (Y-17), France, 6 September – 11 October 1944)
- Rosignano Airfield, Italy, 9 January – 23 May 1945
- Waller Field, Trinidad, 4 June – 31 July 1945
- Donaldson Air Force Base, South Carolina, 14 July 1952 – 21 July 1954
- Naha Air Base, Okinawa, 8 January 1963 – 31 March 1971
- Reese Air Force Base, Texas, 1 October 1972 – 31 July 1996

=== Aircraft ===
- Douglas C-47 Skytrain, 1942–1945
- Fairchild C-82 Packet, 1952–1953
- Fairchild C-119 Flying Boxcar, 1953–1954
- C-130A Hercules, 1963–1971
- Cessna T-37 Tweet, 1972–1996

=== Awards and campaigns ===
| Award streamer | Award | Dates | Notes |
|---|---|---|---|
| | Distinguished Unit Citation | 7 April 1944-15 June 1944 | CBI Theater 35th Troop Carrier Squadron |
| | Presidential Unit Citation | 8 August 1967-7 August 1968 | Southeast Asia 35th Troop Carrier Squadron |
| | Air Force Outstanding Unit Award | 1 July 1964-30 April 1966 | 35th Troop Carrier Squadron |
| | Air Force Outstanding Unit Award | 8 August 1966-7 August 1967 | 35th Troop Carrier Squadron |
| | Air Force Outstanding Unit Award | 1 January 1974-31 December 1975 | 35th Flying Training Squadron |
| | Air Force Outstanding Unit Award | 30 April 1981-29 April 1983 | 35th Flying Training Squadron |
| | Air Force Outstanding Unit Award | 30 April 1983-31 December 1984 | 35th Flying Training Squadron |
| | Air Force Outstanding Unit Award | 1 January 1985-31 March 1986 | 35th Flying Training Squadron |
| | Air Force Outstanding Unit Award | 1 April 1987-31 March 1989 | 35th Flying Training Squadron |
| | Air Force Outstanding Unit Award | 1 April 1988-31 March 1990 | 35th Flying Training Squadron |
| | Vietnamese Gallantry Cross with Palm | 8 August 1966-31 March 1971 | 35th Troop Carrier Squadron (later 35th Tactical Airlift Squadron) |

| Campaign Streamer | Campaign | Dates | Notes |
|---|---|---|---|
| | American Theater without inscription | 4 June 1945 – 31 July 1945 | 35th Troop Carrier Squadron |
| | Tunisia | 12 November 1942 – 13 May 1943 | 35th Troop Carrier Squadron |
| | Sicily | 14 May 1943 – 17 August 1943 | 35th Troop Carrier Squadron |
| | Naples-Foggia | 18 August 1943 – 21 January 1944 | 35th Troop Carrier Squadron |
| | Rome-Arno | 22 January 1944 – 9 September 1944 | 35th Troop Carrier Squadron |
| | Southern France | 15 August 1944 – 14 September 1944 | 35th Troop Carrier Squadron |
| | North Apennines | 10 September 1944 – 4 April 1945 | 35th Troop Carrier Squadron |
| | Po Valley | 3 April 1945 – 8 May 1945 | 35th Troop Carrier Squadron |
| | India-Burma | 7 April 1944 – 15 June 1944 | 35th Troop Carrier Squadron |
