= 517th Airlift Squadron =

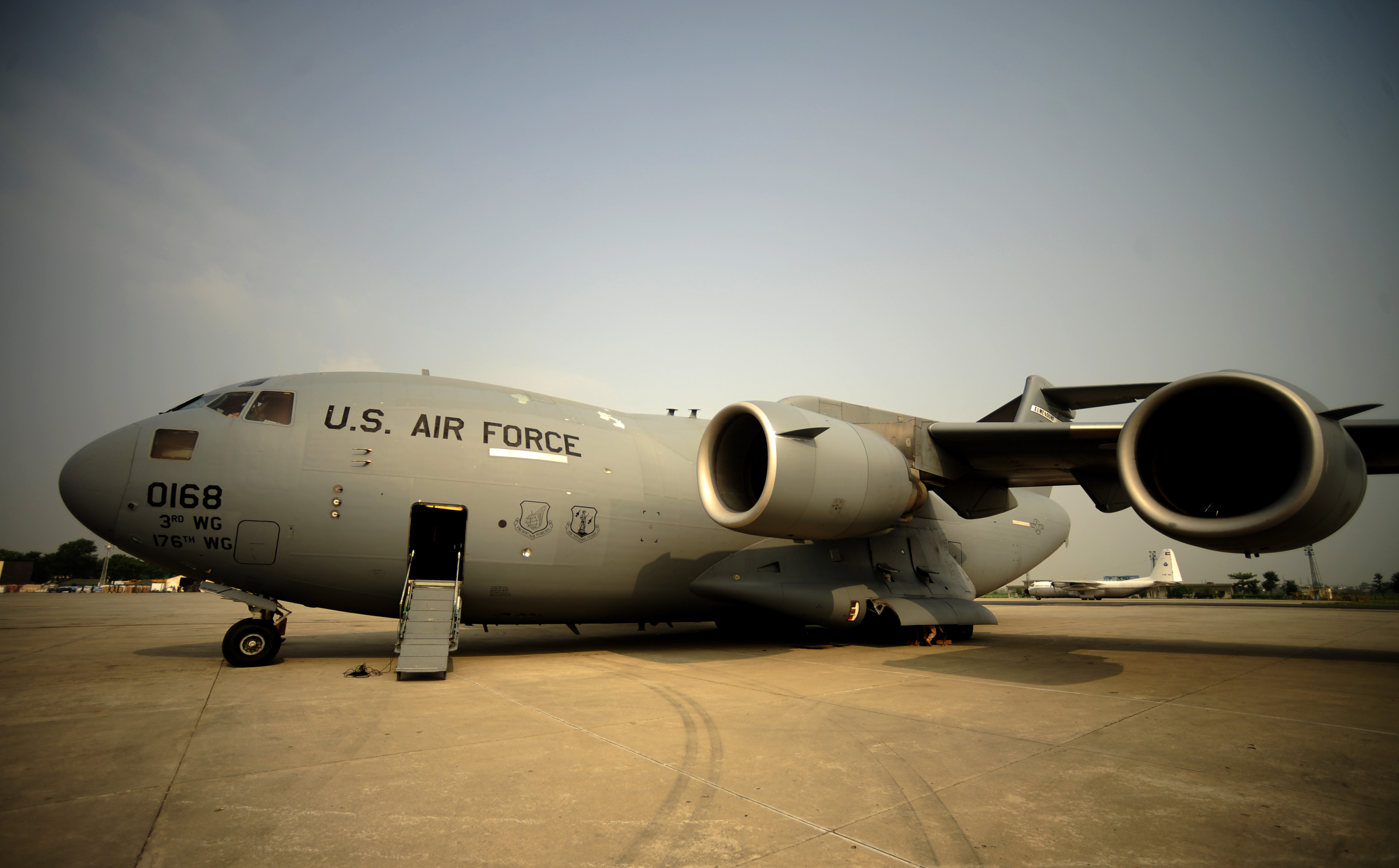
- 517th Squadron C-17 Globemaster III at Pakistan Air Force Base Chaklala (Note: The C-17 airlifted members of the 16th Combat Aviation Brigade to support flood relief efforts on 1 September 2010. The 16th brought two UH-60 Black Hawk helicopters and personnel for relief efforts.)
- Active: 1940–1945; 1947–1948; 1952–1954; 1961–present
- Country: United States
- Branch: United States Air Force
- Role: Airlift
- Part of: Pacific Air Forces
- Garrison/HQ: Elmendorf Air Force Base
- Nickname(s): Firebirds (Note: Originally two words, "Fire Birds".)
- Motto(s): Versatile Capable (1970-1999)
- Engagements: Operation Husky; Operation Dragoon; Vietnam War
- Decorations: Distinguished Unit Citation; Air Force Outstanding Unit Award with Combat "V" Device; Air Force Outstanding Unit Award; Republic of Vietnam Gallantry Cross with Palm

Insignia
- 517th Airlift Squadron emblem (approved 16 February 1999)

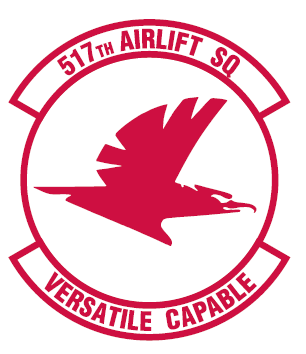
- 17 Tactical Airlift Sq emblem (approved 19 August 1970)

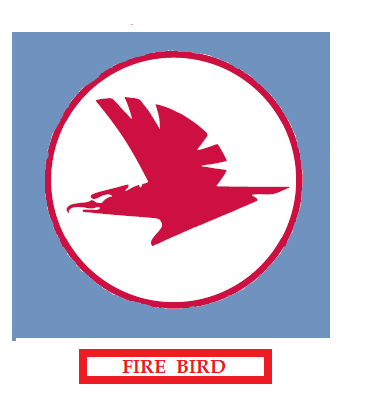
- 17th Troop Carrier Squadron emblem (approved 29 March 1962)

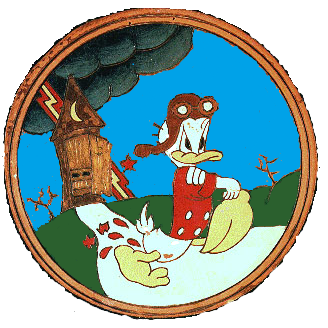
- 17th Troop Carrier Squadron emblem (World War II)

The 517th Airlift Squadron is an active unit of the United States Air Force, Pacific Air Forces 3rd Wing at Joint Base Elmendorf–Richardson, Alaska. It operates Beechcraft C-12 Huron and Boeing C-17 Globemaster III aircraft providing airlift in the Pacific theater.

== Mission ==
The 517th Airlift Squadron provides airlift operating Boeing C-17 Globemaster III and Beechcraft C-12F Huron aircraft. Supporting worldwide airlift, airdrop, airland requirements while providing airlift for theater deployed forces and resupply of remote Alaskan long-range radar sites in support of United States Pacific Command, North American Aerospace Defense Command, and United States Transportation Command. Provides aircrew qualification training for the U.S. Air Force.

== History ==
=== World War II ===
Activated in December 1940 as the 17th Transport Squadron flying Douglas C-47 Skytrain transport aircraft. It trained under I Troop Carrier Command for combat operations. In July 1942, redesignated 17th Troop Carrier Squadron. It was assigned to VIII Air Support Command of Eighth Air Force and deployed to England in August 1942, providing transport to the newly established U.S. Army Air Forces.

The squadron was transferred to Algiers, Algeria in November 1942, and attached, being later assigned to Twelfth Air Force as part of the North African Campaign. The squadron's aircraft flew supplies to front-line units in Algeria and Tunisia as soon as suitable landing strips were available and evacuated casualties back to rear area field hospitals. A flight of the squadron deployed to Tenth Air Force in India during the fall of 1942, to assist in the resupply of Brigadier General Frank Merrill and his men, affectionately known as "Merrill's Marauders". It was during this Ceylon, Burma, India campaign that the squadron received its first Distinguished Unit Citation, returning to Tunisia by the end of the year. During WW II, members of a C-47 crew of the 17th Troop Carrier Squadron were credited with downing an enemy plane after they were attacked by Japanese fighter planes while on a mission near the Indo-Burmese border.

The squadron moved to Sicily, dropping airborne forces onto the island during Operation Husky, then moved to forward airfields in Italy during 1943 as part of the Italian Campaign. Just prior to D Day, part of the 16th left India for Italy to tow gliders into France on D Day.

In July 1944, the detached unit was joined by the remainder of the 16th at Ciampino Airport, Italy and as the European Theater closed in on Germany, part of the 16th again went on detached service to Rosignano Airfield, Italy, operating resupply missions to Greek partisans during September and October 1944.

In the fall of 1944, it moved to France in support of Operation Anvil, the Allied invasion of Southern France, and supported ground forces moving north through the Rhone Valley to link up with Allied forces moving east from Normandy. Returned to Northern Italy in early 1945, supporting the drive into the Po River Valley and the end of combat in Italy during May 1945. The squadron also hauled food, clothing, medicine, gasoline, ordnance equipment, and other supplies to the front lines and evacuated patients to rear zone hospitals.

In late May 1945, after V-E Day, the squadron moved to Waller Field, Trinidad and was attached to Air Transport Command. From Trinidad, the squadron ferried returning military personnel to Morrison Field, Florida, where they were sent on to other bases or prepared for separation after the war. The squadron was inactivated at the end of July 1945.

=== Airlift operations ===
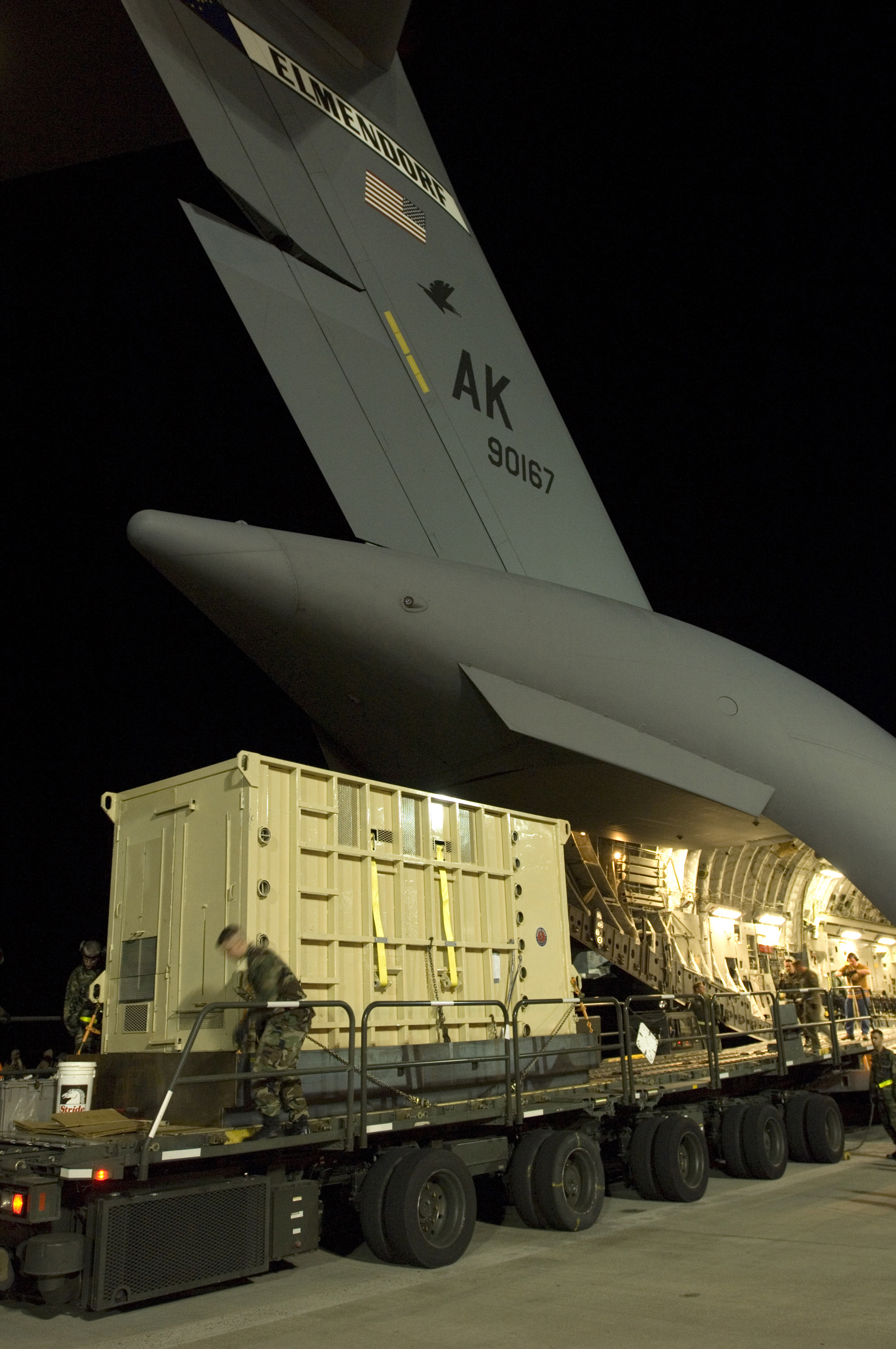
517th Airlift Squadron C-17 Globemaster III offloading Maggie, an 8,000-pound African elephant, for transport to the Performing Animal Welfare Society's ARK 2000 Wildlife Sanctuary.

It was activated but unmanned from 1947 to 1948. When reactivated again in the 1960 it resupplied Distant Early Warning Line sites in Northern Canada and radar sites in Greenland. Parts of the squadron deployed to South Vietnam from 1967–1968 to provide tactical airlift. It provided intratheater airlift within Alaska including support to forward operating bases, airland/airdrop of troops, equipment and supplies, and Search and rescue as required. It provided Lockheed C-130 Hercules crews for Pacific airlift to the Middle East for Operation Desert Shield, from August to November 1990.

Redesignated the 517th Airlift Squadron on 1 Apr 1992, it has provided worldwide combat airdrop, tactical air/land, operational support airlift, airlift for theater deployed forces and resupply of remote Alaskan long-range radar sites in support of Pacific Air Forces. It has provided continuous rotational airlift and airdrop support in Afghanistan and Iraq since 2004. The 517th, flying C-130H1s, was among first United States units to participate in relief efforts following the 2004 Asian tsunami that occurred on 26 December 2004.

== Lineage ==
- Constituted as the 17th Transport Squadron on 20 November 1940

Activated on 11 December 1940
Redesignated 17th Troop Carrier Squadron on 4 July 1942
Inactivated on 31 July 1945

- Activated on 19 May 1947

Inactivated on 10 September 1948

- Redesignated 17th Troop Carrier Squadron, Medium on 3 July 1952

Activated on 14 July 1952
Inactivated on 21 July 1954

- Activated on 24 October 1960 (not organized)

Organized on 8 February 1961
Redesignated 17th Troop Carrier Squadron on 8 December 1965
Redesignated 17th Tactical Airlift Squadron on 1 September 1967
Redesignated 517th Airlift Squadron on 1 April 1992 (Note: In 1991-1992, the Air Force simplified many of its operational unit designations. This change included the combination of "Tactical Airlift" and "Military Airlift" units into simply "Airlift" units. At the time the change was made, both the 17th Tactical Airlift Squadron and the 17th Military Airlift Squadron were active, and both were considered notable enough to remain active. This required a change to the number of the squadron to avoid duplication.)

=== Assignments ===
- 64th Transport Group (later 64th Troop Carrier Group), 11 December 1940 – 31 July 1945
- 64th Troop Carrier Group, 19 May 1947 – 10 September 1948
- 64th Troop Carrier Group, 14 July 1952 – 21 July 1954
- Tactical Air Command, 24 October 1960 (not organized)
- 64th Troop Carrier Wing, 8 February 1961
- 516th Troop Carrier Wing, 1 January 1963
- 5040th Air Base Wing, 15 June 1964
- 21st Composite Wing, 8 July 1966
- Twenty-Second Air Force, 31 March 1975
- 616th Military Airlift Group, 1 November 1975
- 3d Operations Group, 1 April 1992 – present

=== Stations ===
- McClellan Field, California, 11 December 1940
- Portland Army Air Base, Oregon, 9 July 1941
- Westover Field, Massachusetts, 12 June–31 July 1942
- RAF Ramsbury (AAF-469), England, 18 August–November 1942

Operated from Maison Blanche Airport, Algiers, Algeria, 11 November–December 1942

- Blida Airfield, Algeria, c. 12 December 1942
- Kairouan Airfield, Tunisia, 28 June 1943
- El Djem Airfield, Tunisia, 26 July 1943
- Comiso Airfield, Sicily, 4 September 1943

Operated from bases in India, 7 April–June 1944

- Ciampino Airport, Italy, 10 July 1944

Operated from Istres/Le Tubé Airfield (Y-17), France, 7 September–11 October 1944

- Rosignano Airfield, Italy, 10 January–23 May 1945

Operated from Brindisi Airfield, Italy, 29 March–13 May 1945

- Waller Field, Trinidad, 4 June–31 July 1945
- Langley Field (later Langley Air Force Base), Virginia 19 May 1947 – 10 September 1948
- Donaldson Air Force Base, South Carolina, 14 July 1952 – 21 July 1954
- Dyess Air Force Base, Texas, 8 February 1961
- Elmendorf Air Force Base, Alaska, 15 June 1964 – present

=== Aircraft ===
- Douglas C-47 Skytrain (1941–1945)
- Fairchild C-82 Packet (1952–1953)
- Fairchild C-119 Flying Boxcar (1953–1954)
- Lockheed C-130 Hercules (1961–2007)
- Douglas C-124 Globemaster II (1970–1971)
- Beechcraft C-12 Huron (1992–present)
- Boeing C-17 Globemaster III (2007–present)

=== Awards and campaigns ===
- Campaigns. World War II: Algeria-French Morocco; Tunisia; Sicily; Naples-Foggia; Rome-Arno; Southern France; North Apennines; Po Valley, India-Burma. Vietnam: Vietnam Air Offensive; Vietnam Air Offensive, Phase II.
- Decorations. Distinguished Unit Citation: CBI Theater, 7 Apr-15 June 1944. Air Force Outstanding Unit Award with Combat "V" Device: 2 May 1967 – 1 January 1968. Air Force Outstanding Unit Awards: 1 July 1962 – 15 June 1964; 16 June 1964 – 31 May 1966; 8 July 1966 – 1 May 1967; 2 Jan-31 December 1968; 1 Jan-31 December 1969; 1 Jan-31 December 1970; 1 Jan-31 December 1971; 1 Jan-31 December 1972; 1 Jan-31 December 1974; 1 Jan-30 March 1975; 1 Jan-31 December 1979; 1 June 1986 – 31 May 1987; 1 June 1987 – 31 May 1989; 1 January 1994 – 31 December 1995; 1 January 1996 – 30 September 1998; 1 January 2000 – 31 December 2001; 1 January 2002 – 30 September 2003; 1 October 2003 – 30 September 2005. Republic of Vietnam Gallantry Cross with Palm: 1 September 1966 – 1 January 1968.
