= 18th Air Refueling Squadron =

US Air Force unit

18th Air Refueling Squadron

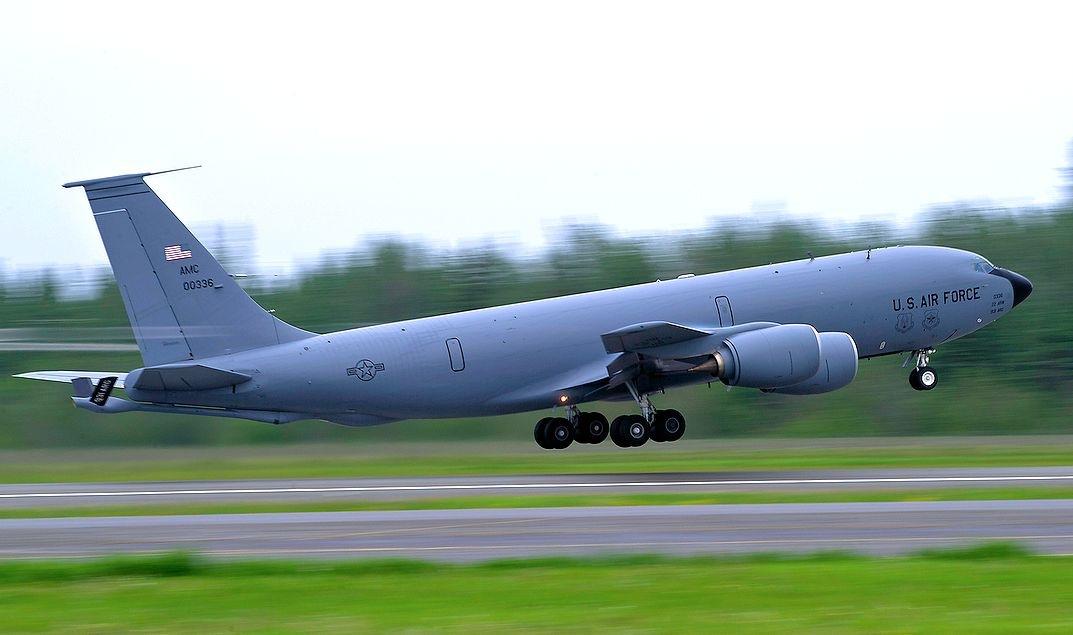
- 931st Air Refueling Group KC-135 Stratotanker takes off from Eielson AFB during Exercise Red Flag Alaska (Note: Aircraft is Boeing KC-135R-BN Stratotanker serial 60-336, taken on 12 June 2012.)
- Active: 1940–1945; 1948–1949; 1952–1954; 1961–1967; 1969–1972; 1995–present
- Country: United States
- Branch: United States Air Force
- Role: Air refueling
- Part of: Air Force Reserve Command
- Garrison/HQ: McConnell Air Force Base
- Motto: Can Do (1969–1972, c. 1995)
- Engagements: Mediterranean Theater of Operations; China-Burma-India Theater
- Decorations: Distinguished Unit Citation; Air Force Outstanding Unit Award

Insignia
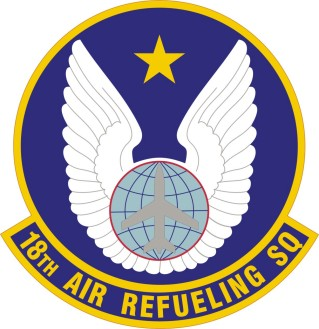
- 18th Air Refueling Squadron emblem

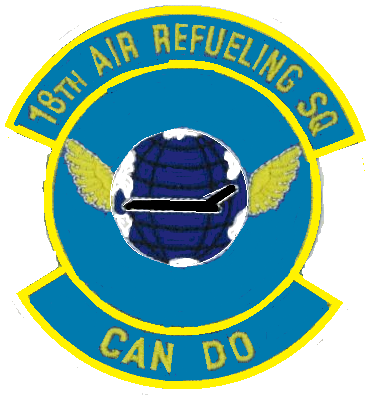
- 18 Air Refueling Squadron emblem (early)

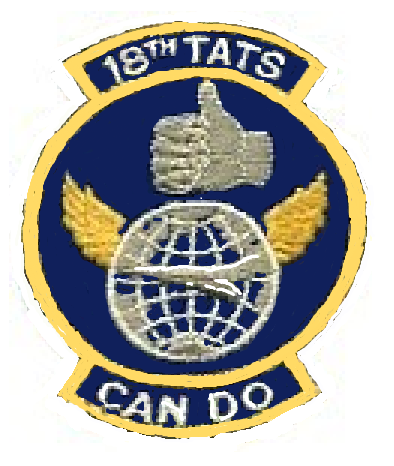
- Patch with 18th Tactical Airlift Training Squadron emblem

The 18th Air Refueling Squadron is a United States Air Force Reserve squadron, assigned to the 931st Air Refueling Wing at McConnell Air Force Base, Kansas. It operates the Boeing KC-135R Stratotanker aircraft conducting air refueling missions. If mobilized the squadron would be gained by Air Mobility Command.

The squadron was first activated during World War II as the 18th Transport Squadron. After training in the United States, the squadron deployed to the Mediterranean Theater of Operations, where, as the 18th Troop Carrier Squadron, it participated in all major airborne assault operations and earned a Distinguished Unit Citation. From April until June 1944, it deployed to the China Burma India Theater to augment forces in Burma. Following V-E Day, the squadron served under Air Transport Command in the Caribbean returning American soldiers to the United States. The squadron was again briefly active in the Caribbean area during the later 1940s.

The squadron was active again from 1952, when it absorbed the resources of a reserve unit that had been mobilized for the Korean War. It was again active from 1961 until 1972, when it participated in military exercises, provided airlift, and trained aircrew for deployment to Southeast Asia.

== Mission ==
The squadron operates the KC-135 Stratotanker aircraft, conducting aerial refueling missions.

== History ==
"During World War II the 18th flew airborne assaults on Sicily, Myitkyina, Burma, and Southern France in addition to supporting partisans in Northern Italy from January to May 1945 and conducting aerial transportation in the Mediterranean Theater of Operations (MTO) and briefly in the China-Burma-India Theater (CBI). It flew strategic and tactical airlift missions from 1948 to 1954 and 1962 to 1967. The squadron provided tactical airlift training for US and subsequently South Vietnamese pilots and crews from 1969 to 1972.

This unit has flown worldwide air refueling missions since 1995."

=== Operations ===
- World War II
- Operation Husky (the invasion of Sicily)
- Operation Dragoon (the invasion of southern France)
- Operation Joint Endeavor (Peacekeeping in Bosnia Herzegovina)
- Operation Joint Guard (Peacekeeping in Bosnia Herzegovina), 21 June 1996 – 19 June 1998
- Operation Joint Forge (Peacekeeping in Bosnia Herzegovina), June 201998 – 12 February 2004
- Southern Watch (enforcing a no-fly zone in pre-war southern Iraq)
- Northern Watch (enforcing a no-fly zone in pre-war northern Iraq)
- Operation Desert Fox (December 1998 bombing of Iraq)
- Operation Enduring Freedom (The war on terrorism - War in Afghanistan (2001-2021))
- Operation Iraqi Freedom (2003 Iraq War)
- Operation Noble Eagle ( US homeland security)

== Lineage ==
- Constituted as the 18th Transport Squadron on 20 November 1940

Activated on 11 December 1940
Redesignated 18th Troop Carrier Squadron on 4 July 1942
Inactivated on 31 July 1945

- Redesignated 18th Troop Carrier Squadron, Heavy on 24 July 1948

Activated on 1 August 1948
Inactivated on 1 March 1949

- Redesignated 18th Troop Carrier Squadron, Medium on 3 July 1952

Activated on 14 July 1952
Inactivated on 21 July 1954

- Activated on 3 August 1961 (not organized)

Organized on 8 January 1962
Redesignated 18th Troop Carrier Squadron on 1 March 1966
Discontinued and inactivated, on 25 June 1967

- Redesignated 18th Tactical Airlift Training Squadron on 14 August 1969

Activated on 15 October 1969
Inactivated on 31 August 1972

- Redesignated 18th Air Refueling Squadron on 9 September 1994

Activated in the reserve on 1 October 1995

=== Assignments ===
- 64th Transport Group (later 64 Troop Carrier Group), 11 December 1940 – 31 July 1945
- 5700th Composite Wing, 1 August 1948 – 1 March 1949
- 64th Troop Carrier Group, 14 July 1952 – 21 July 1954
- Tactical Air Command, 3 August 1961 (not organized)
- 64th Troop Carrier Wing, 8 January 1962
- 516th Troop Carrier Wing, 1 January 1963
- 314th Troop Carrier Wing, 1 July 1963
- 317th Troop Carrier Wing (later 317th Tactical Airlift Wing), 1 April 1965 – 25 June 1967
- 516th Tactical Airlift Wing, 15 October 1969
- 463d Tactical Airlift Wing, 1 June – 31 August 1972
- 931st Air Refueling Group, 1 October 1995 – present

=== Stations ===
- McClellan Field, California, 11 December 1940
- March Field, California, 11 July 1941
- Westover Field, Massachusetts, 9 June–31 July 1942
- RAF Ramsbury, England, 18 August–c. November 1942 (operated From Maison Blanche Airport, Algeria after 11 November 1942)
- Blida Airfield, Algeria, 16 December 1942
- Kairouan Airfield, Tunisia, 1 July 1943
- El Djem Airfield, Tunisia, 26 July 1943
- Comiso Airfield, Italy, 8 September 1943 (operated from bases in India, April–27 June 1944)
- Ciampino Airfield, Italy, 10 July 1944 (operated From: Istres Air Base, France 7 September – 11 November 1944)
- Rosignano Airfield, Italy, 9 January – 23 May 1945
- Waller Field, Trinidad, 4 June – 31 July 1945
- Albrook Air Force Base, Panama Canal Zone, 1 August 1948 – 1 March 1949
- Donaldson Air Force Base, South Carolina, 14 July 1952 – 21 July 1954
- Dyess Air Force Base, Texas, 8 January 1962
- Sewart Air Force Base, Tennessee, 1 July 1963
- Lockbourne Air Force Base, Ohio, 1 April 1965 – 25 June 1967
- Dyess Air Force Base, Texas, 15 October 1969 – 31 August 1972
- McConnell Air Force Base, Kansas, 1 October 1995 – present

=== Aircraft ===
- Douglas C-47 Skytrain (1941–1945)
- Douglas C-54 Skymaster (1948–1949)
- Fairchild C-82 Packet (1951–1953)
- Fairchild C-119 Flying Boxcar (1953–1954)
- Lockheed C-130 Hercules (1962–1967)
- de Havilland Canada C-7 Caribou (1969–1972)
- Boeing KC-135 Stratotanker (1995–present)
