= 64th Air Expeditionary Group =

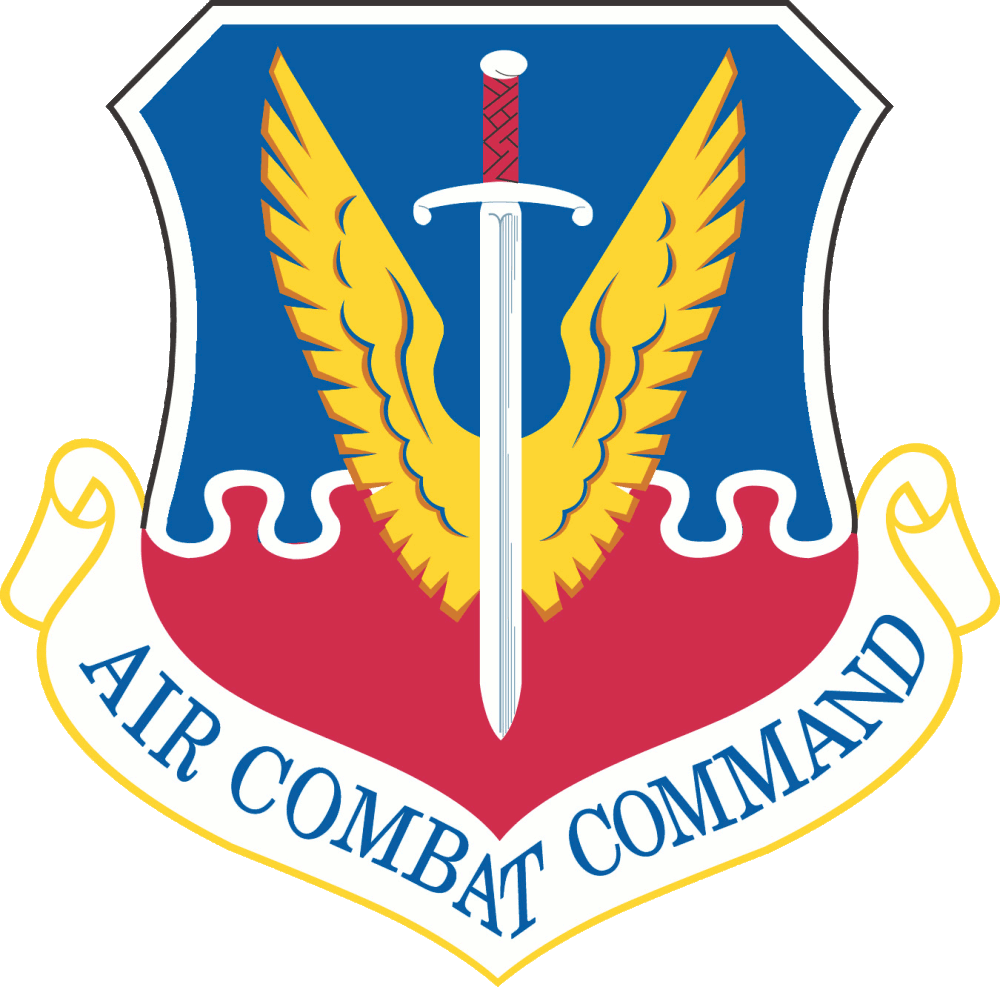
64th Air Expeditionary Group

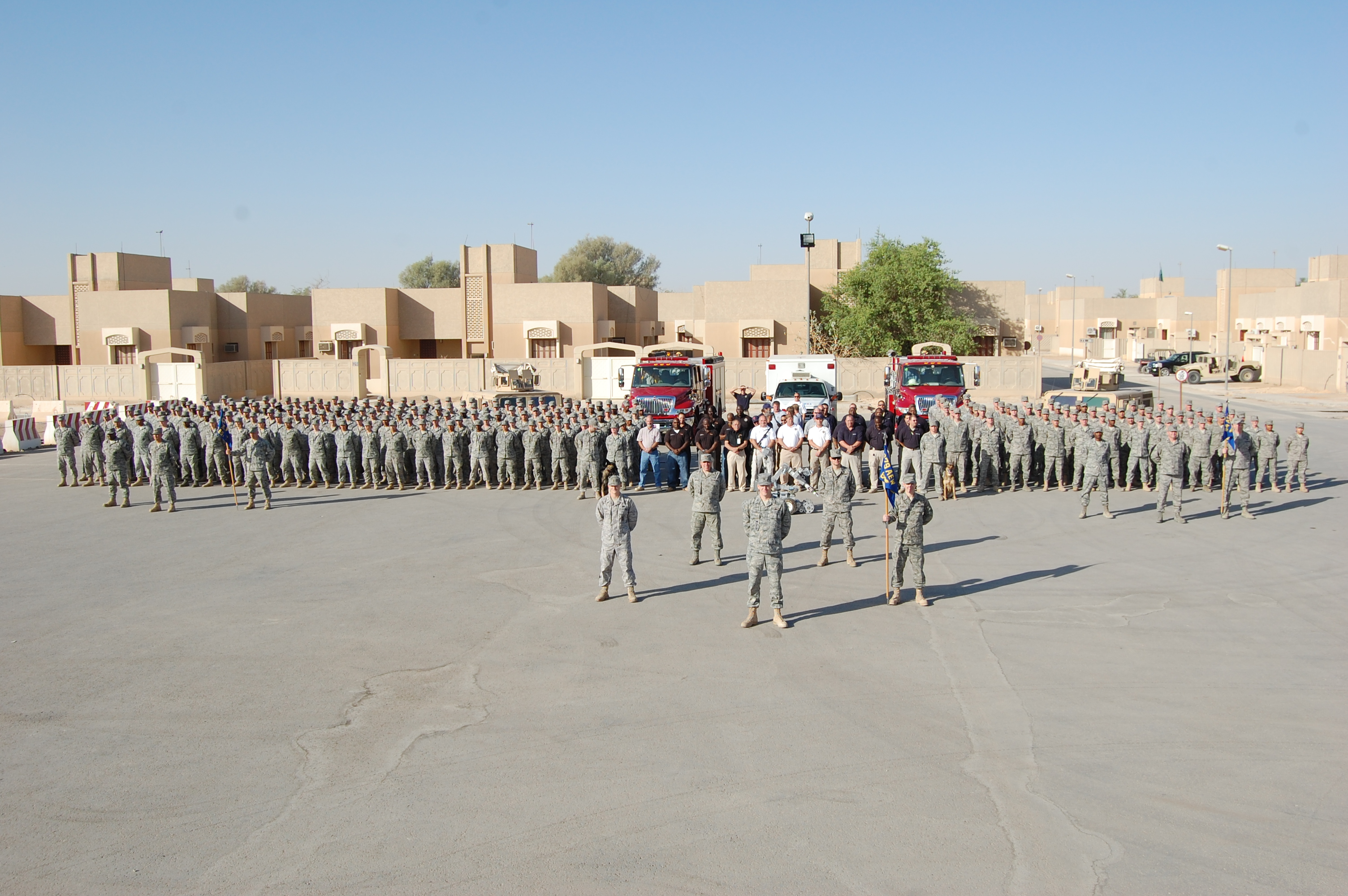
- 64th group photo, November 2010
- Active: 1940–1945; 1947–1948; 1952–1954; 1991–1997; 2001-unknown; 2005–2014; 2021
- Country: United States
- Branch: United States Air Force
- Role: Force protection and support
- Part of: Air Combat Command
- Motto: Flying Support (World War II) Hardest Target in the Kingdom
- Engagements: European Theater of Operations, Mediterranean Theater of Operations Global War on Terrorism (2005-TBD)
- Decorations: Distinguished Unit Citation 7 April – 15 June 1944: Meritorious Unit Award; 1 June 2005 – 31 May 2006 1 June 2006 – 31 May 2007 1 June 2007 – 31 May 2008 1 June 2008 – 31 May 2009 1 June 2009 – 31 May 2010: Air Force Outstanding Unit Awards; 1 July 1992 – 30 June 1993 1 October 1995 – 30 September 1997

Insignia
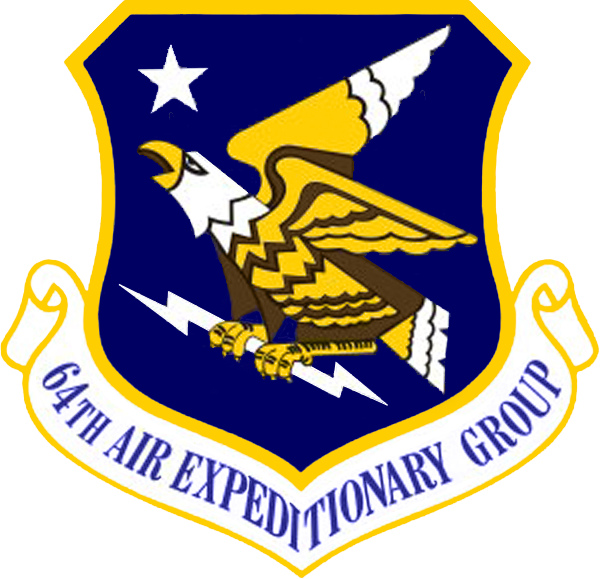
- 64th Air Expeditionary Group emblem (Note: Approved for the 64th Wing, the group uses the wing emblem with the group designation on the scroll. AF Instruction 84-105, Organizational Lineage, Honors and History, 27 April 2017, paragraph 3.3.3.)

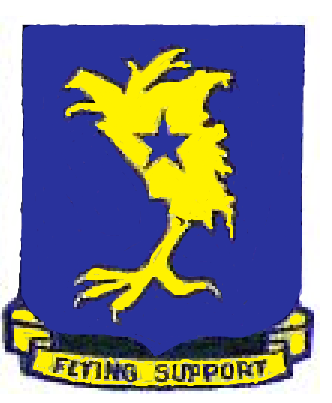
- 64th Troop Carrier Group emblem (Note: Approved 16 June 1942.)

The 64th Air Expeditionary Group is a provisional United States Air Force group, most recently assigned to Air Forces Northern (AFNORTH). Supporting Federal Emergency Management Agency (FEMA) operations, the group deployed medical and support personnel to hospitals in California to assist civilian staff during the COVID-19 pandemic. As the number of United States citizens with COVID-19 declined, the group transitioned to establishing Air Force-led COVID-19 Community Vaccination Center sites.

- 64th Expeditionary Medical Operations Squadron (EMDOS) located in Houston, Texas at Reliant Stadium (operational February 2021 to May 2021).
- Detachment 1 located in Detroit, Michigan at Ford Field (operational March 2021 to May 2021).
- Detachment 2 located in Gary, Indiana at Theodore Roosevelt Park (operational April 2021 to June 2021).
- Detachment 3 located in Saint Paul, Minnesota at The State Fair (operational April 2021 to June 2021).
- Detachment 4 located in Grand Rapids, Michigan at DeVos Place (operational April 2021 to June 2021).

Prior to supporting FEMA during the COVID-19 pandemic, the last activation was in direct support of the 379th Air Expeditionary Wing at Eskan Village, near Riyadh, Saudi Arabia. It was inactivated in 2014.

The group was first activated in December 1940 as the 64th Transport Group, a year before the Attack on Pearl Harbor. During the Second World War it fought primarily with Twelfth Air Force, earning a Distinguished Unit Citation.

== History ==
=== World War II ===
It was constituted as the 64th Transport Group on 20 November 1940 and later activated on 4 December 1940. The group operated Douglas C-47 aircraft for training and transport missions within the United States.

Redesignated 64th Troop Carrier Group in July 1942. Moved to England in August 1942 and received additional training. Became part of Twelfth Air Force. Moved to the Mediterranean theater, November–December 1942. Flew first mission on 11 November, landing paratroops at Maison Blanche Airport. Dropped paratroops to capture airfields during the battle for Tunisia. Released paratroops near Gela and Catania when the Allies invaded Sicily in July 1943. Dropped paratroops near Avellino during the invasion of Italy in September 1943 to destroy a bridge on the enemy's supply line to Salerno. Participated in the assault on southern France in August 1944 by releasing gliders and paratroops in the battle zone. Supported the partisans in northern Italy early in 1945 by dropping paratroops, supplies, and propaganda leaflets behind enemy lines.

When not engaged in airborne combat operations, the group continually transported men and supplies to the front lines and evacuated wounded personnel.

Most of the group was on detached service in the China Burma India Theater from April–June 1944, while a remnant remained in Sicily. With its squadrons operating from separate bases in India, the group aided the Allied offensive in Burma. It was awarded a Distinguished Unit Citation for flying unarmed over rugged enemy territory to carry food, clothing, medical supplies, guns, ammunition, and mules to the combat zone and to evacuate wounded personnel.

The group moved to Trinidad in June 1945 and was assigned to Air Transport Command. Inactivated on 31 July 1945.

Activated in the United States on 19 May 1947. Not manned during 1947–1948. Inactivated on 10 September 1948.

=== Cold War ===
The 64th performed airlift and airdrop/airlanding of troops and cargo, routinely and during frequent maneuvers, 1952–1953. It began phasing down for inactivation in mid-October 1953, at which time tactical operations passed to 63d Troop Carrier Wing. In February 1954, however, the wing began building up again in preparation for an overseas movement, but was inactivated instead.

=== Flying training ===
From the implementation of the Objective Wing organization until 1997, the group served as the flying arm of the 64th Flying Training Wing.

=== Expeditionary operations ===
The 64 AEG/AEW operated out of Camp Snoopy at Doha International Airport, Qatar from 1996 until 2004.

In 2005, the group was activated for defense of personnel and assets in Southwest Asia. It provided force protection and support services for the installation in Riyadh, Saudi Arabia, known as Eskan Village, replacing the former 320th Air Expeditionary Group. The group was made up of about 300 security forces, support airmen, and civilians in two squadrons: the 64th Expeditionary Security Forces Squadron and the 64th Expeditionary Support Squadron. Their mission was to stand guard, provide integrated defense, emergency response, and combat support for the base, which housed military and host-nation tenant agencies. Operations were conducted in temperatures often exceeding 100 degrees Fahrenheit.

In April 2020, the group was reactivated under the leadership of Air Force Colonel Adrian Byers. The group assisted the New York Health and Hospital Systems with medical duties during the COVID-19 pandemic. The leadership cell functioned out of Joint Base McGuire-Dix-Lakehurst, NJ with forward presence stationed at the Jacob Javits Convention Center in New York under the leadership of Deputy Commander, Lt Col Curt Hasse. The COVID response mission ended and the 64 AEG was once again inactivated in July 2021.

== Lineage ==
Group

- Constituted as the 64th Transport Group on 20 November 1940

Activated on 4 December 1940

- Redesignated 64th Troop Carrier Group on 1 July 1942

Inactivated 31 July 1945

- Activated on 19 May 1947

Inactivated on 10 September 1948

- Redesignated 64th Troop Carrier Group, Medium on 3 July 1952

Activated on 14 July 1952
Inactivated on 21 July 1954

- Redesignated 64th Military Airlift Group on 31 July 1985
- Redesignated 64th Operations Group on 1 May 1991

Activated on 15 May 1991
Inactivated on 30 September 1997

- Redesignated 64th Air Expeditionary Group, converted to provisional status and assigned to Air Combat Command to activate or inactivate as needed on 4 December 2001

Activated December 2001
Inactivated unknown
Activated 2005
Inactivated 1 May 2014
Activated April 2020
Inactivated July 2020
Activated 23 Dec 2020

=== Assignments ===
- Fourth Air Force, 4 December 1940
- 50th Transport Wing, 31 March 1942
- 51st Transport Wing (later 51st Troop Carrier Wing), 1 June 1942
- Eighth Air Force, 18 August 1942
- 51st Troop Carrier Wing, 1 September 1942
- Twelfth Air Force, 4 September 1942
- 51st Troop Carrier Wing, 25 October 1942
- 52d Troop Carrier Wing, 15 June 1943
- 51st Troop Carrier Wing, 11 July 1943 (air echelon attached to Tenth Air Force, c. 7 April – c. 15 June 1944)
- Air Transport Command, 25 May 1945 – 31 July 1945
- Tactical Air Command, 19 May 1947 – 10 September 1948
- 64th Troop Carrier Wing, 14 July 1952 – 21 July 1954 (attached to 443d Troop Carrier Wing, 19 July – 16 October 1952; 63d Troop Carrier Wing, 15 October 1953 – 15 February 1954)
- 64 Flying Training Wing, 15 May 1991 – 1 April 1997
- Air Combat Command to activate or inactivate any time after 4 December 2001

December 2001 – unknown
379th Air Expeditionary Wing, 23 September 2005 – 1 May 2014

- Air Force Northern, Northern Command, 23 Dec 2020 - 17 May 2021

=== Stations ===
- Duncan Field, Texas, 4 December 1940
- March Field, California, c. 13 July 1941;
- Hamilton Field, California, c. 1 February 1942
- Westover Field, Massachusetts, c. 8 June – 31 July 1942;
- RAF Ramsbury, England, August–November 1942
- Blida Airfield, Algeria, December 1942
- Kairouan Airfield, Tunisia, 28 June 1943
- El Djem Airfield, Tunisia, 26 July 1943
- Comiso Airfield, Sicily, 29 August 1943
- Ciampino Airfield, Italy, 10 July 1944
- Rosignano Airfield, Italy, 10 January – 23 May 1945
- Waller Field, Trinidad, 4 June – 31 July 1945
- Langley Field (later Langley Air Force Base), Virginia, 19 May 1947 – 10 September 1948
- Donaldson Air Force Base, South Carolina, 14 July 1952 – 21 July 1954
- Reese Air Force Base, Texas 15 May 1991 – 1 April 1997
- Doha International Air Base, Qatar (1997–2005)
- Eskan Village, Saudi Arabia, 23 September 2005 – 1 May 2014
- Travis Air Force Base, California 23 Dec 2020 - 17 May 2021

=== Components ===
Squadrons

- 16th Transport Squadron (later 16th Troop Carrier Squadron): 4 December 1940 – 31 July 1945, 19 May 1947 – 10 September 1948
- 17th Transport Squadron (later 17th Troop Carrier Squadron): 4 December 1940 – 31 July 1945, 19 May 1947 – 10 September 1948, 14 July 1952 – 21 July 1954
- 18th Transport Squadron (later 18th Troop Carrier Squadron): 4 December 1940 – 31 July 1945
- 33d Flying Training Squadron: 15 December 1991 – 1 October 1992
- 35th Transport Squadron (later 35th Troop Carrier Squadron, 35th Flying Training Squadron): 4 December 1940 – 31 July 1945, 19 May 1947 – 10 September 1948, 15 December 1991 – 31 July 1996
- 52d Flying Training Squadron: 15 December 1991 – 1 April 1997
- 54th Transport Squadron (later 54th Flying Training) Squadron: 1–11 June 1942; 15 December 1991 – 1 April 1997
- 64th Expeditionary Security Forces Squadron 23 September 2005 – 1 May 2014
- 64th Expeditionary Support Squadron 23 September 2005 – 1 May 2014
- T-1A Flying Training Squadron, Provisional, attached 15 December 1991 – 1 October 1992
- 64th Expeditionary Medical Operations Squadron, 18 Feb 2021 - May 2021
- 64th AEG Detachment 1,2,3,4 18 Mar 2021 - May 2021

=== Aircraft ===
- Douglas C-47 Skytrain, 1940–1945
- C-82 Packet (1952–1953)
- C-119 Flying Boxcar (1953–1954)
- T-37 Tweet (1991–1997)
- T-38 Talon (1991–1997)
- T-1 Jayhawk (1992–1997)
