= 16th Airlift Squadron =

- A 16th Airlift Squadron loadmaster exits a C-17 Globemaster III aircraft at Joint Base Charleston
- Active: 1940–1945; 1947–1948; 1950–1955; 1969–2000; 2002–present
- Country: United States
- Branch: United States Air Force
- Type: Airlift
- Part of: Air Mobility Command
- Garrison/HQ: Joint Base Charleston
- Engagements: Mediterranean Theater of Operations; China Burma India Theater
- Decorations: Distinguished Unit Citation; Air Force Outstanding Unit Award

Insignia
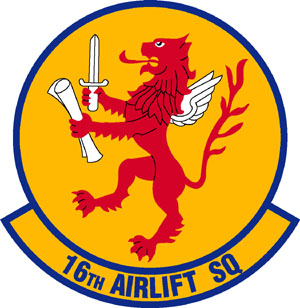
- 16th Airlift Squadron emblem (approved 17 December 1980)

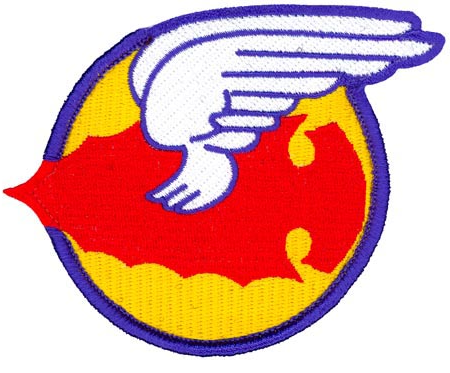
- 16th Troop Carrier Squadron emblem (approved 25 June 1951)

The 16th Airlift Squadron is an active unit of the United States Air Force, assigned to the 437th Airlift Wing, Air Mobility Command. It is based at Joint Base Charleston, South Carolina. The squadron operates Boeing C-17 Globemaster III aircraft supporting the United States Air Force global reach mission worldwide.

== Mission ==
The 16th Airlift Squadron provide combat-ready Boeing C-17A Globemaster III aircrews for worldwide airlift missions supporting Department of Defense and National Command Authority directives. They conduct airdrop and air-land operations supporting global contingencies for combatant commanders by projecting and sustaining combat forces directly into theater drop zones and austere airfields.

The unit perform emergency nuclear airlift, aeromedical evacuation & humanitarian relief missions in the technologically advanced, C-17A airlift aircraft in all phases of ground and flight activity.

== History ==
=== World War II ===
20 Nov 1940, the unit was constituted as 16 Transport Squadron and activated two weeks later on 11 Dec 1940. The squadron converted to Douglas DC-2 transport aircraft as a GHQ Air Force transport squadron. Converted to Douglas C-47 Skytrains in early 1942, trained under I Troop Carrier Command for combat operations. Redesignated 16 Troop Carrier Squadron on 4 Jul 1942. Assigned to VIII Air Support Command, Eighth Air Force and deployed to England in August 1942, providing transport to the newly established American Air Force.

Was transferred to Algiers, Algeria in November 1942, and attached, being later assigned to Twelfth Air Force as part of the North African Campaign. The squadron's aircraft flew supplies to front-line units in Algeria and Tunisia as soon as suitable landing strips were available and evacuated casualties back to rear area field hospitals. A flight of the squadron deployed to Tenth Air Force in India during the fall of 1942, to assist in the re-supply of Brigadier General Merrill and his men, affectionately known as "Merrill's Marauders". It was during this Ceylon, Burma, India campaign that the squadron received its first Distinguished Unit Citation, returning to Tunisia by the end of the year.

The squadron moved to Sicily, dropping airborne forces onto the island during Operation Husky, then moved to forward airfields in Italy during 1943 as part of the Italian Campaign. Just prior to D Day, part of the 16th left India for Italy to tow gliders into France on "D" Day. In July 1944, the detached unit was joined by the remainder of the 16th at Ciampino Airport, Italy and as the European Theater closed in on Germany, part of the 16th again went on detached service to Rosignano Airfield, Italy, operating resupply missions to Greek partisans during September to October 1944.

In the fall of 1944, moved to France in support of Operation Anvil, the Allied invasion of Southern France, and supported ground forces moving north through the Rhone Valley to link up with Allied forces moving east from Normandy. Returned to Northern Italy in early 1945, supporting the drive into the Po River Valley and the end of combat in Italy during May 1945. The squadron also hauled food, clothing, medicine, gasoline, ordnance equipment, and other supplies to the front lines and evacuated patients to rear zone hospitals.

In late May 1945, after V-E Day, the squadron moved to Waller Field, Trinidad and attached to Air Transport Command. From Trinidad, the squadron ferried returning military personnel to Morrison Field, Florida, where they were sent on to other bases or prepared for separation after the war. Inactivated at the end of July 1945.

=== Tactical airlift in the Cold War ===
Reactivated briefly in 1947–1948 at Langley Field, Virginia as a Tactical Air Command troop carrier squadron, but never fully manned or equipped.

Reactivated during the Korean War at Sewart Air Force Base, Tennessee and equipped with Fairchild C-119 Flying Boxcars and other assault transports to be used for airborne combat assault operations. Performed training for combat units, but remained in the United States. Moved to Ardmore Air Force Base, Oklahoma in 1954 and was inactivated in 1955.

Redesignated the 16th Tactical Airlift Training Squadron on 14 August 1969 and reactivated six weeks later flying Lockheed C-130 Hercules at Sewart Air Force Base, Tennessee. With the pending closure of Sewart, the squadron was reassigned Little Rock AFB, Arkansas, in March 1970 to fly and conduct initial upgrade training on the C-130 A and E models.

On February 16, 1972, Lockheed C-130E Hercules #62-1813, c/n 3775, of the 16th Tactical Airlift Training Squadron, mid-air collision with Cessna T-37 Tweet, 6 kilometers northeast of Little Rock, Arkansas.

Following post-Cold War reorganization, the squadron was redesignated as the 16th Airlift Squadron on 1 December 1991 under the 314th Operations Group.

=== Strategic airlift ===
On 1 October 1993 the squadron was reassigned without aircraft or personnel to the 437th Operations Group, Charleston AFB, South Carolina, to replace the 76th Airlift Squadron flying the Lockheed C-141 Starlifter. Over the next six years the 16th AS provided the nation's only long-range, rapid-response, special operations low level (SOLL) capability. The squadron provided the backbone of the nation's elite special operations forces and used the "Bad to the Bone" motto on their unit patches. Ever vigilant in sitting continuous alert 24 hours, 7 days a week, the 16th routinely responded to short-notice National Command Authority taskings. The squadron used uniquely qualified aircrews, trained in the use of enhanced night vision equipment and specially modified aircraft for unconventional warfare ops. In this capacity, the 16th AS was tasked with delivering the sting of US special forces by maintaining continuous JCS-directed alert force for global contingencies and thus provide the nation's rapid deployment airlift/airdrop capability. These crews rapidly deployed and inserted special operations ground forces into blacked-out, austere airfields/drop zones and extracted those ground forces upon mission completion. This unique mission was formally transferred to McGuire AFB, New Jersey in April 1999.

The last C-141 to leave Charleston AFB occurred on or about 7 September 2000 and the squadron was officially inactivated on 29 September 2000. The squadron was reactivated 1 Jul 2002 as the fourth active duty flying squadron operating the C-17 Globemaster III.

== Lineage ==
- Constituted as the 16th Transport Squadron on 20 November 1940

Activated on 11 December 1940
Redesignated 16th Troop Carrier Squadron on 4 July 1942
Inactivated on 31 July 1945

- Activated on 19 May 1947

Inactivated on 10 September 1948

- Redesignated 16th Troop Carrier Squadron, Assault, Light on 19 September 1950

Activated on 5 October 1950
Redesignated 16th Troop Carrier Squadron, Assault, Fixed Wing on 8 November 1954
Inactivated on 8 July 1955

- Redesignated 16th Tactical Airlift Training Squadron on 14 August 1969

Activated on 15 October 1969
Redesignated 16th Airlift Squadron on 1 December 1991
Inactivated on 29 September 2000

- Activated on 1 July 2002

=== Assignments ===
- 64th Transport Group (later 64th Troop Carrier Group), 11 December 1940 – 31 July 1945
- 64th Troop Carrier Group, 19 May 1947 – 10 September 1948
- 316th Troop Carrier Group, 5 October 1950
- Eighteenth Air Force (attached to 463d Troop Carrier Wing), 14 November 1954 – 8 July 1955
- 4442d Combat Crew Training Wing, 15 October 1969
- 314th Tactical Airlift Wing, 1 August 1971
- 34th Tactical Airlift Training Group, 1 November 1978
- 314th Operations Group, 1 December 1991
- 437th Operations Group, 1 October 1993 – 29 September 2000
- 437th Operations Group, 1 July 2002 – present

=== Stations ===
- McClellan Field, California, 11 December 1940
- Portland Army Air Base, Oregon, 9 July 1941
- Westover Field, Massachusetts, 12 June-31 July 1942
- RAF Ramsbury (AAF-469), England, 18 August–November 1942 (operated from Maison Blanche Airport, Algeria, 11 November–December 1942)
- Blida Airfield, Algeria, c. 12 December 1942
- Kairouan Airfield, Tunisia, 28 June 1943
- El Djem Airfield, Tunisia, 26 July 1943
- Comiso Airfield, Sicily, 4 September 1943 (operated from bases in India, 7 April–June 1944)
- Ciampino Airport, Italy, 10 July 1944 (operated from Istres/Le Tubé Airfield (Y-17)), France, 7 September-11 October 1944
- Rosignano Airfield, Italy, 10 January-23 May 1945 (operated from Brindisi Airfield, Italy, 29 March-13 May 1945)
- Waller Field, Trinidad, 4 June-31 July 1945
- Langley Field, Virginia, 19 May 1947 – 10 September 1948
- Sewart Air Force Base, Tennessee, 5 October 1950
- Ardmore Air Force Base, Oklahoma, 14 November 1954 – 8 July 1955
- Sewart Air Force Base, Tennessee, 15 October 1969
- Little Rock Air Force Base, Arkansas, c. 15 March 1970
- Charleston Air Force Base, South Carolina, 1 October 1993 – 29 September 2000
- Charleston Air Force Base, South Carolina, 1 July 2002 – present

=== Aircraft ===
- Douglas C-47 Skytrain (1941–1945)
- Fairchild C-119 Flying Boxcar (1950–1951)
- Chase YC-122 Avitruc (1951–1955)
- Sikorsky H-19 Chickasaw (1952)
- Sikorsky H-5 (1952)
- Lockheed C-130 Hercules (1969–1993)
- Lockheed C-141 Starlifter (1993–2000)
- Boeing C-17 Globemaster III (2002–present)

=== Awards and campaigns ===
- Campaigns. World War II: Algeria-French Morocco; Tunisia; Sicily; Naples-Foggia; Rome-Arno; Southern France; North Apennines; Po Valley; India-Burma; Air Combat, EAME Theater.
- Decorations. Distinguished Unit Citation: CBI Theater, 7 Apr-15 Jun 1944. Air Force Outstanding Unit Awards: 30 September 1975 – 30 June 1976; 1 June 1985 – 31 May 1986; 1 July 1991 – 30 June 1993; 1 July 1993 – 30 June 1995; 1 July 1995 – 30 June 1997; 1 July 1997 – 30 June 1998; 1 July 1998 – 29 September 2000.
