= 64th Flying Training Wing =

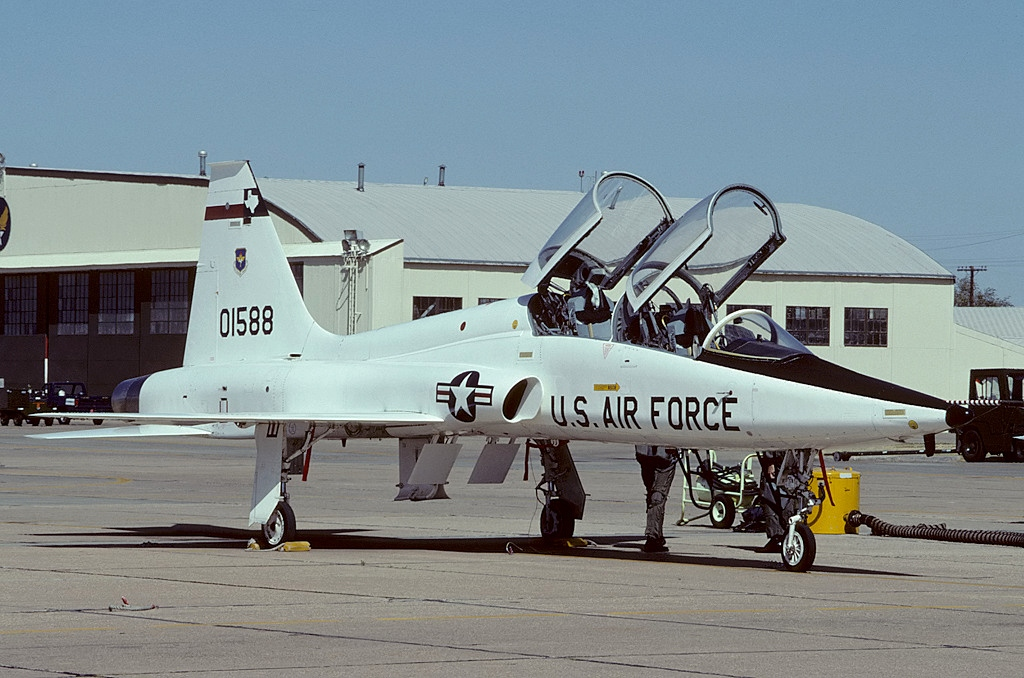
- 64th Flying Training Wing Northrop T-38A Talon
- Active: 1952-1954; 1961–1963; 1966-1971; 1972-1997
- Country: United States
- Branch: United States Air Force
- Role: Pilot training
- Motto: Flying Support (1952–1954) Advolamus ad Periculi Locum (Latin for 'We Fly to Dangerous Places') (1962–1971)
- Decorations: Air Force Outstanding Unit Award with Combat V device Air Force Outstanding Unit Award

Insignia
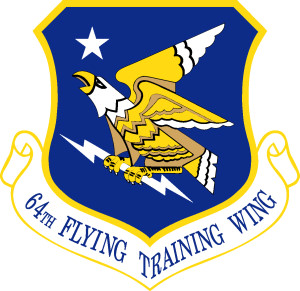
- 64th Flying Training Wing emblem (Note: Approved 20 February 1973. Description: Azure, a stylized eagle ascending bendwise with wings elevated, head, neck, wing tips, and tail feathers argent, body, beak, wings, legs claws, and talons are garnished brown and sable, grasping a lightning flash of the second [color], in dexter chief a mullet of five points of the like [color], all within a diminished bordure or.)

The 64th Flying Training Wing is an inactive United States Air Force unit. It was last active at Reese Air Force Base, Texas, where it conducted pilot training for twenty-five years before it was inactivated in September 1997.

The wing was first activated in as the 64th Troop Carrier Wing in 1952 at Donaldson Air Force Base, South Carolina, but was inactivated within two years. It was again active twice as an airlift unit in the 1960s. In 1972, Air Training Command replaced its four digit Major Command controlled flying training units with units whose heritage could be continued and the wing was activated at Reese, where it conducted pilot training until it was inactivated.

== History ==
=== Airlift ===
==== Donaldson Air Force Base operations ====
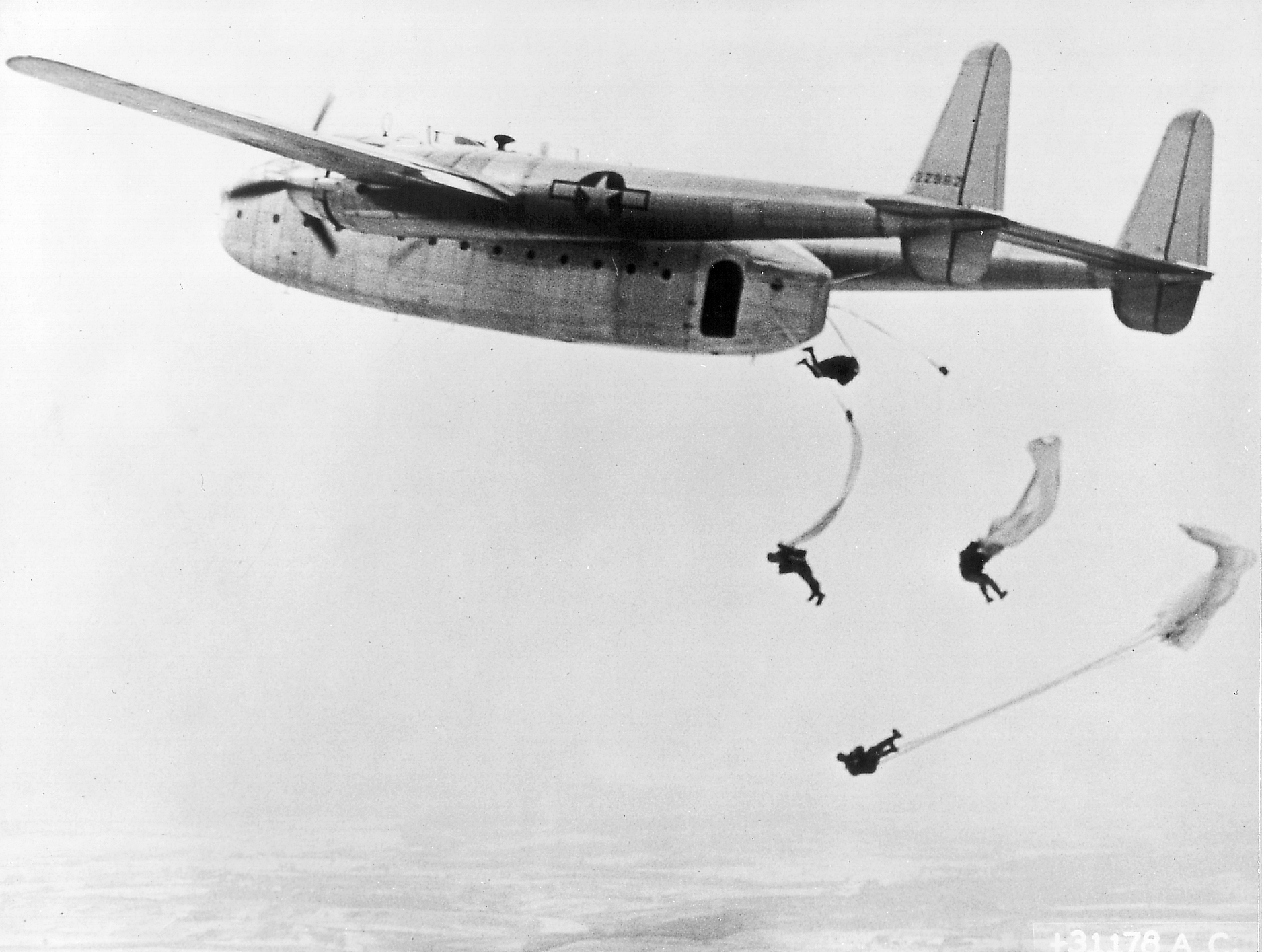
Paratroopers jump from a C-82 Pcket

The 64th Troop Carrier Wing was activated at Donaldson Air Force Base, South Carolina on 14 July 1952, taking over the personnel, mission and Fairchild C-82 Packets of the inactivating 375th Troop Carrier Wing, a reserve unit that had been called to active duty for the Korean War. It performed airlift and airdrop/airlanding of troops and cargo, routinely and during frequent maneuvers. From January 1953, when the reserve 443d Troop Carrier Wing was relieved from active duty, until February 1953, when that wing's operational component, the 443rd Troop Carrier Group was inactivated, the 443rd Group was attached to the 64th Wing. The 443rd Group was replaced by the regular 465th Troop Carrier Group, which was attached to the wing until the fall of 1953, as the group prepared for movement to France. The wing then began phasing down for inactivation in mid-October 1953, when it was attached to the 63d Troop Carrier Wing, which took over its tactical operations. In February 1954, however, the wing began building up again with Fairchild C-119 Flying Boxcars in preparation for an overseas movement, but the movement was cancelled and it was inactivated in July 1954 instead.

==== Dyess Air Force Base operations ====
The 64th was activated at Dyess Air Force Base, Texas on 8 February 1961 and began to organize with Lockheed C-130 Hercules aircraft. Its primary mission was as a troop carrier/tactical airlift unit, but it also conducted resupply of Distant Early Warning Line sites on the Greenland ice cap, flying its first mission on 8 May. Elements of the wing deployed to the Indian Ocean area to support NASA space missions. It also provided airlift support for President Kennedy's 1962 visit to Mexico City. In the fall of 1962, the wing was engaged in developing procedures for C-130s for Project Skyhook, retrieving personnel or cargo by engaging a cable attached to a balloon.

During the Cuban Missile Crisis, the wing flew 107 missions to support American forces, mostly in Florida. Shortly thereafter, on 1 January 1963, the wing was inactivated and transferred its mission, personnel and C-130s to the 516th Troop Carrier Wing, which was simultaneously activated.

==== Sewart Air Force Base operations ====
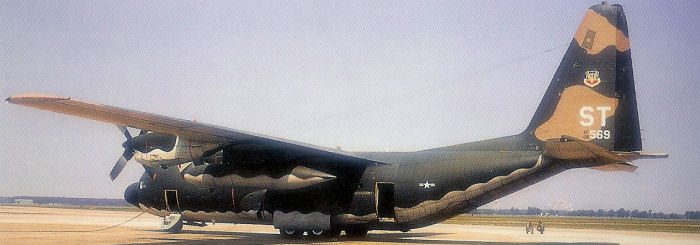
Wing C-130 at Sewart AFB (Note: Aircraft is Lockheed C-130E, serial 69-6569.)

On 1 December 1965, in anticipation of the forthcoming move of the 314th Troop Carrier Wing to Taiwan, Tactical Air Command activated the Troop Carrier Wing, Provisional, 4413th at Sewart Air Force Base, Tennessee. When the 314th Wing moved, it assumed control of squadrons already on Taiwan, and two of its squadrons, the 61st and 62d Troop Carrier Squadrons remained at Sewart and were attached to the 4413th. On 1 July 1966, the 64th was activated to replace the provisional unit and took command of the former 314th squadrons. The wing provided global airlift and aeromedical evacuation. It also provided C-130 Hercules combat crew training for other units while at Sewart, with crew training being the wing's primary activity from 9 August 1968 to 6 March 1970. On 1 May 1967, the wing was redesignated the 64th Tactical Airlift Wing. In March 1970, it moved to Little Rock Air Force Base, Arkansas, where, in May 1971, the wing inactivated and was replaced by the 314th Tactical Airlift Wing, which had returned from the Pacific on paper.

=== Flying training ===
==== Background ====
The United States Air Force reopened Reese Air Force Base, Texas as a pilot training base, moving the 3500th Flying Training Wing there on 1 October 1949 from Barksdale Air Force Base, Louisiana, where it had been formed on 28 August 1948, to make room for tactical flying units of Strategic Air Command, which assume control of Barksdale. The 3500th initially conducted advanced multi-engine training using North American TB-25 Mitchells. In 1957, the wing began using Lockheed T-33 T-Birds, graduating its last B-25 class in January 1959. (Note: This was the last class to graduate from multi-engine pilot school and to use the B--25 as a trainer. A History of Air Education and Training Command, p. 158.) When Air Training Command (ATC) discontinued its separate primary flying training units, it added Cessna T-37 Tweets. In the late 1960s, the wing replaced its T-Birds with Northrop T-38 Talons.

==== Training at Reese Air Force Base ====
The 64th was renamed the 64th Flying Training Wing and replaced the 3500th Pilot Training Wing in October 1972, assuming the mission of undergraduate pilot training and operation and maintenance of Reese Air Force Base, Texas. This was part of a program to preserve the lineage of units that had served in combat. (Note: Although the 64th Wing was not formed until 1952, it carried the bestowed history of the World War II 64th Troop Carrier Group.) In 1974, ATC let contracts for the installation of four instrument flight simulator complexes for the wing. It was intended that these simulators would replace instrument flying training missions with the exception of validation flights. The system became operational in 1978

In 1988, ATC determined that the implementation of Specialized Undergraduate Pilot Training could require reorganization of its flying training wings. Following a test at Williams Air Force Base, Arizona, second squadrons were activated In 1990 for the wing's T-37s and its T-38s. At Reese, a fifth squadron provided operational support. At the same time, the wing inactivated its maintenance squadrons, and maintenance of its aircraft was performed by contractors. With the implementation of the Objective Wing organization in late 1991, the fifth squadron was replaced by an operations support squadron, and all were assigned to the newly activated 64th Operations Group.

It supported Strategic Air Command's Accelerated Copilot Enrichment Program through operating locations at Minot Air Force Base, North Dakota; Ellsworth Air Force Base, South Dakota; and Grand Forks Air Force Base, North Dakota from 1976 until 1991.

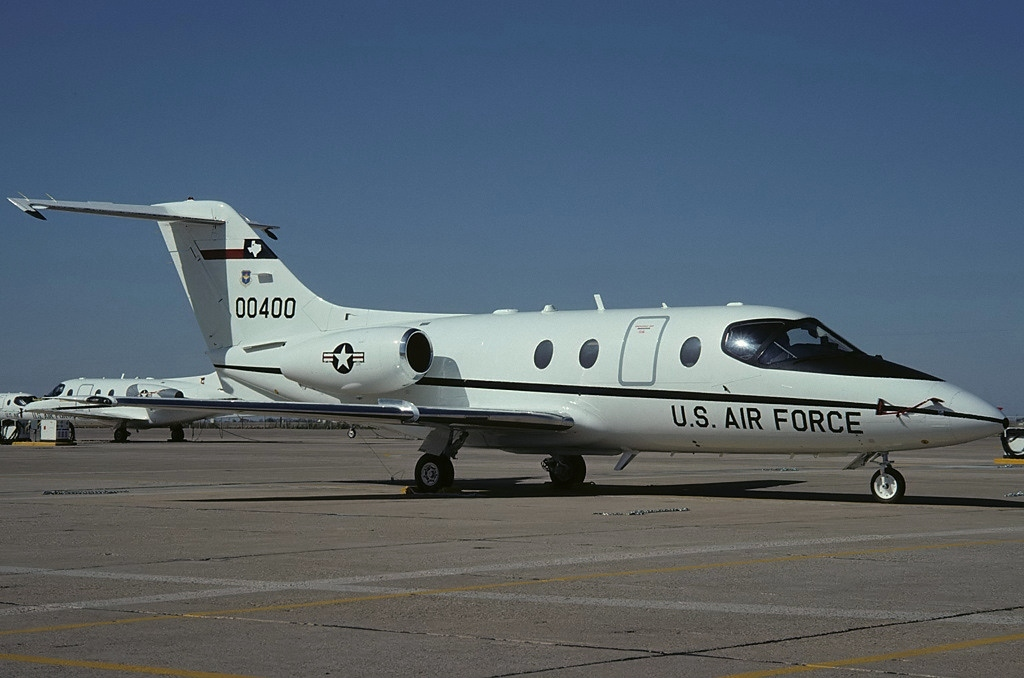
Wing T-1 Jayhaw (Note: Aircraft is Beech T-1A Jayhawk, serial 90-0400. This was the first T-1A delivered to the Air Force.)

The 64th began specialized undergraduate pilot training in July 1992, using Beech T–1A Jayhawk to prepare students for airlift tanker/transport training and the Northrop T-38 Talon aircraft for students in fighter/bomber track. Earlier in 1992, a provisional flying training squadron had been formed and attached to the wing's operations group to develop training techniques and qualify the initial instructors for the new T-1. In September the provisional squadron was discontinued and the 52d Flying Training Squadron, one of the wing's T-38 squadrons, took over its T-1s.

The requirements for new pilots in the Air Force dropped dramatically in the early 1990s. After a review, ATC decided to inactivate the 33d Flying Training Squadron, one of the wing's T-37 squadrons, leaving the wing with one squadron flying each of its three trainers. With the implementation of Joint Specialized Undergraduate Piot Training in 1993, three naval instructor pilots were assigned to the wing in September, while three of the wing's instructors were assigned to Naval Air Station Corpus Christi in December. The first naval aviators to participate in the program began their training the following September. In December 1993, the wing began the Introduction to Bomber Fundamentals course, training not only pilots, by also navigators and electronic warfare officers in crew coordination and low level flying procedures. The 1995 Base Realignment and Closure Commission announced that Reese would be closed in 1997. The wing inactivated on 30 September 1997, the day before Reese Air Force Base closed.

=== Involvement in international politics ===
In 1978, Reza Pahlavi. the Crown Prince of Iran began pilot training with the 64th Wing. Following the 1979 Iranian Revolution, his training was accelerated and he graduated from pilot training in March 1979. While the new government in Iran cancelled further entries of Iranian military into training programs in the USA, those already enrolled were permitted to complete their training. This included the Crown Prince, and he was able to remain in the United States after graduation.

== Lineage ==
- Established as the 64th Troop Carrier Wing, Medium on 3 July 1952

Activated on 14 July 1952
Inactivated on 21 July 1954
Activated on 24 October 1960 (not organized)
Organized on 8 February 1961
Discontinued and inactivated, on 1 January 1963

- Redesignated 64th Troop Carrier Wing and activated on 7 March 1966 (not organized)

Organized on 1 July 1966
Redesignated 64th Tactical Airlift Wing on 1 May 1967
Inactivated on 31 May 1971

- Redesignated 64th Flying Training Wing on 14 April 1972

Activated on 1 October 1972
Inactivated on 30 September 1997

- Redesignated 64th Air Expeditionary Wing and converted to provisional status on 4 December 2001

=== Assignments ===
- Eighteenth Air Force, 14 July 1952 – 21 July 1954 (attached to 63d Troop Carrier Wing, 15 October 1953 – 1 March 1954)
- Tactical Air Command, 24 October 1960 (not organized)
- Ninth Air Force, 8 February 1961
- Twelfth Air Force, 1 January 1962 – 1 January 1963
- Tactical Air Command, 7 March 1966 (not organized)
- 839th Air Division, 1 July 1966
- Twelfth Air Force, 9 March 1970 – 31 May 1971
- Air Training Command (later Air Education and Training Command), 1 October 1972
- Nineteenth Air Force, 1 July 1993 – 30 September 1997
- Air Combat Command to activate or inactivate any time after 4 December 2001

=== Stations ===
- Donaldson Air Force Base, South Carolina, 14 July 1952 – 21 July 1954
- Dyess Air Force Base, Texas, 8 February 1961 – 1 January 1963
- Sewart Air Force Base, Tennessee, 1 July 1966
- Little Rock Air Force Base, Arkansas, 9 March 1970 – 31 May 1971
- Reese Air Force Base, Texas, 1 October 1972 - 30 September 1997

=== Components ===
Groups

- 64th Air Base Group (later 64th Support Group): 14 July 1952 – 21 July 1954, 9 March 1970 – 30 September 1997
- 64th Maintenance & Supply Group: 14 July 1952 – 21 July 1954
- 64th Troop Carrier Group (later 64th Operations Group): 14 July 1952 – 21 July 1954, 15 Dec 1991 – 30 September 1997
- 443d Troop Carrier Group: attached 8 January – 1 February 1953
- 465th Troop Carrier Group: attached 1 February – 15 October 1953

Operational Squadrons

- 4th Liaison Squadron: attached 22 July 1952 – 23 January 1953
- 7th Liaison Squadron: attached 20 October 1952 – 9 January 1953
- 17th Troop Carrier Squadron: 8 February 1961 – 1 January 1963
- 18th Troop Carrier Squadron: 8 January 1962 – 1 January 1963
- 33d Flying Training Squadron: 11 May 1990 – 15 December 1991
- 35th Flying Training Squadron: 1 October 1972 – 1 July 1996
- 41st Flying Training Squadron: 10 January 1990 – 15 May 1991
- 52d Flying Training Squadron: 11 May 1990 – 15 December 1991
- 54th Flying Training Squadron: 1 October 1972 – 15 December 1991
- 61st Troop Carrier Squadron (later 61st Tactical Airlift Squadron): 1 July 1966 – 31 May 1971 (detached 5 May – 14 August 1967; 28 March – 29 June 1968; 28 May – 7 July 1970, 12 October – 19 December 1970)
- 62d Troop Carrier Squadron (later 62d Tactical Airlift Squadron): 1 July 1966 – 31 May 1971 (detached 13 December 1967 – c. 28 March 1968; 1 July – 2 October 1968; 5 November 1969 – 17 January 1970; 2 July – 31 August 1970; 2 April – 31 May 1971)

=== Aircraft ===
- Fairchild C-82 Packet (1952–1953)
- de Havilland Canada L-20 Beaver (1952–1953)
- Fairchild C-119 Flying Boxcar (1953–1954)
- Lockheed C-130 Hercules (1961–1963, 1966–1971)
- Cessna T-41 Mescalero (1972–1973)
- Cessna T-37 Tweet (1972–1997)
- Northrop T-38 Talon (1972–1997)
- Beech (later Raytheon) T-1 Jayhawk (1992–1997)

=== Awards ===
| Award streamer | Award | Dates | Notes |
|---|---|---|---|
| | Air Force Outstanding Unit Award with Combat "V" Device | 1 July 1966 – 30 June 1967 | 64th Troop Carrier Wing |
| | Air Force Outstanding Unit Award | 1 June 1969 – 31 May 1971 | 64th Tactical Airlift Wing |
| | Air Force Outstanding Unit Award | 30 April 1981 – 29 April 1983 | 64th Flying Training Wing |
| | Air Force Outstanding Unit Award | 1 April 1984 – 31 March 1986 | 64th Flying Training Wing |
| | Air Force Outstanding Unit Award | 1 April 1988 – 31 March 1990 | 64th Flying Training Wing |
| | Air Force Outstanding Unit Award | 1 July 1992 – 30 June 1993 | 64th Flying Training Wing |
| | Air Force Outstanding Unit Award | 1 October 1995 – 30 September 1997 | 64th Flying Training Wing |

== See also ==
- List of MAJCOM wings of the United States Air Force
- List of C-130 Hercules operators
