= 839th Air Division =

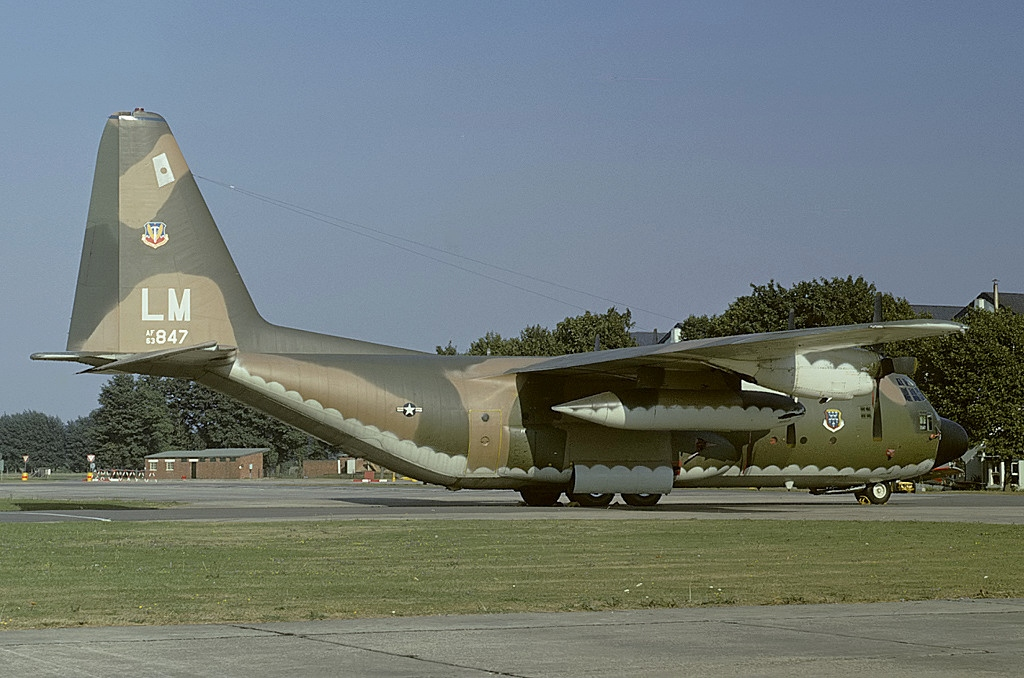
- Lockheed C-130 of the 316th Tactical Airlift Wing (Note: Aircraft is Lockheed C-130E-LM Hercules, serial 63-7847. This plane was transferred to the Aerospace Maintenance and Regeneration Center on 8 July 2008. Baugher, Joe (26 July 2023). "1963 USAF Serial Numbers". Joe Baugher. Photo taken at RAF Abbingdon.)
- Active: 1957–1974
- Country: United States
- Branch: United States Air Force
- Role: Command of airlift forces

Insignia
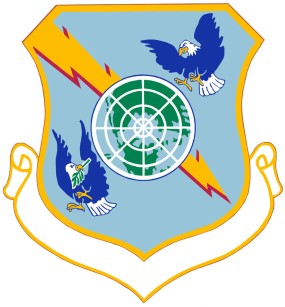
- 839th Air Division emblem (Note: Approved 16 June 1958. Description: Azure, bendwise striking to sinister base a lightning flash or, garnished gules, overall a North Pole projection of the globe of the [color of the] field fimbriated dark blue with land masses vert segmented argent throughout, between two eagles volant of the fourth [color mentioned], head and tail of the sixth [color mentioned], armed of the second [Color mentioned], the one in base bearing a laurel branch in its beak of the fifth [color mentioned], all within a diminished border gold.)

The 839th Air Division is an inactive United States Air Force organization. Its last assignment was with Military Airlift Command, assigned to Twenty-First Air Force at Sewart Air Force Base, Tennessee, although except for the last month of its existence it was assigned to Tactical Air Command. It was inactivated on 31 December 1974.

The division was activated at Sewart in 1957. Except for a short period following its activation and two years during the Vietnam War when it had squadrons flying the Fairchild C-123 Provider, the division's operational units were equipped with the Lockheed C-130 Hercules. In addition to its airlift mission, the division supervised combat crew training and developed tactics for assault airlift operations.

== History ==
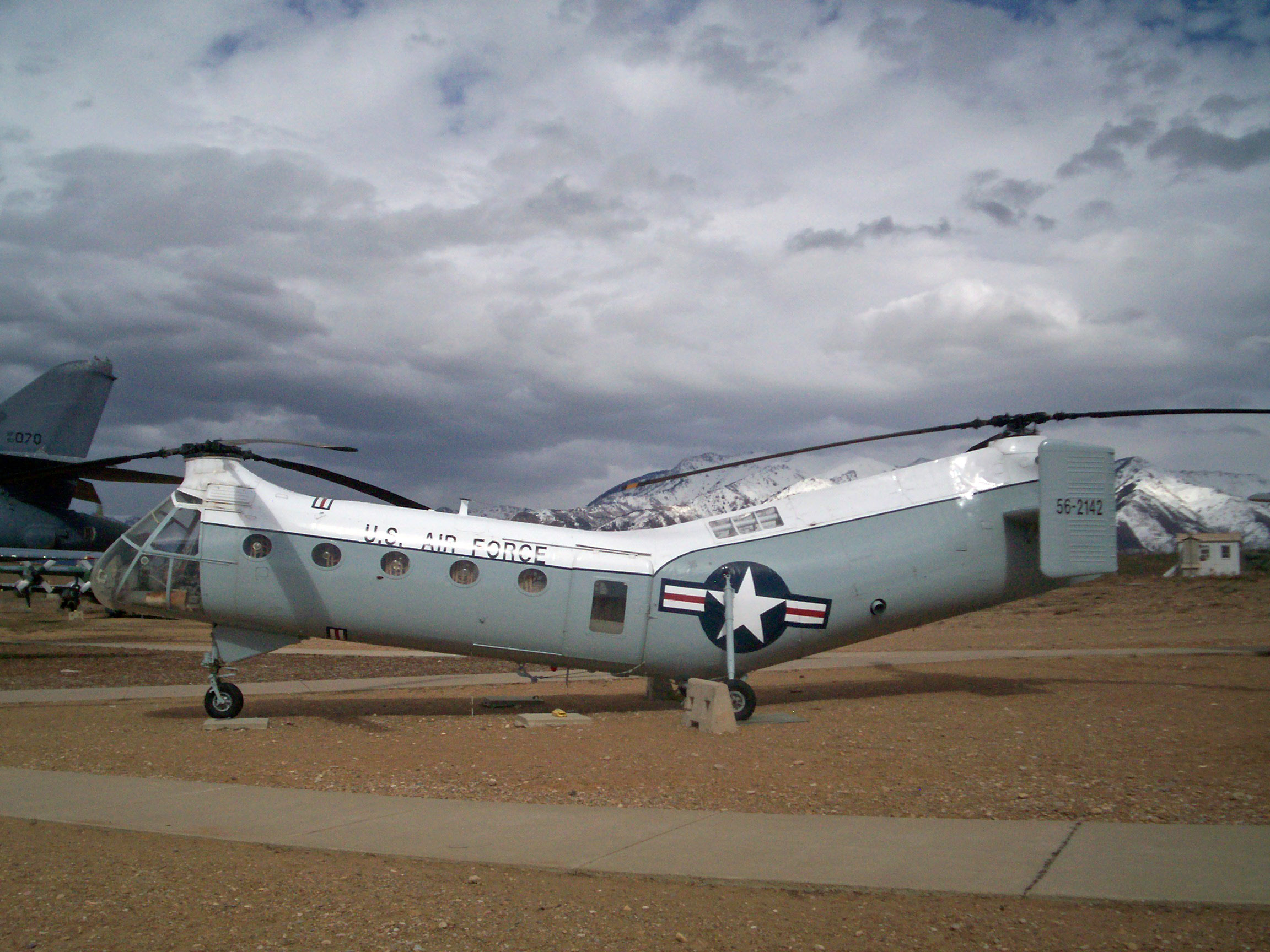
H-21 helicopter

The 839th Air Division was first activated at Sewart Air Force Base, Tennessee in October 1957. The division was assigned the 314th Troop Carrier Wing and the newly activated 513th Troop Carrier Wing. (Note: The 513th Wing replaced the 513th Troop Carrier Group, which had been at Sewart since June 1955. Maurer, Combat Units, p. 53.) The division's 839th Air Base Group served as the host organization for Sewart, providing support for all active duty Air Force units stationed there. Subordinate troop carrier units performed joint airborne training with Army forces, developed assault airlift operations, and participated in aerial demonstrations, tactical exercises, maneuvers, and joint operations.

The 513d Wing flew Fairchild C-123 Providers, while the 314th was re-equipping with Lockheed C-130 Hercules aircraft. In November 1958, the 513d Wing was inactivated, but two squadrons of Providers were not inactivated with the group, but were instead reassigned to the 314th Wing. During 1958 the 839th's components airlifted forces deploying during the Lebanon crisis and Second Taiwan Strait Crisis.

Six weeks after the inactivation of the 513th Wing, the 463d Troop Carrier Wing moved to Sewart from Ardmore Air Force Base, Oklahoma. The 463d was the first Air Force unit to fly the C-130, and once it was in place, Sewart became the primary base for training on the Hercules.

The 839th supported forces deployed during the construction of the Berlin Wall in 1961, the Cuban Missile Crisis in October through November 1962 and the Dominican Civil War from April 1965 to September 1966.

Although the 463d Wing moved from Sewart to Langley Air Force Base, Virginia in July 1963, the C-130 training mission remained behind. What had begun modestly as an adjunct to the 463d, the 4442d School Squadron, expanded to a group and ultimately, in 1965, to a dedicated training wing, the 4442d Combat Crew Training Wing. The 4442d conducted C-130 training for all Air Force commands flying the Hercules. Because by 1968 all early model C-130A aircraft were being operated by the Air Force Reserve or the Air National Guard, training on that model was transferred to the 446th Tactical Airlift Wing, a reserve unit at Ellington Air Force Base, Texas. The 4442d continued its training mission at Sewart until February 1970, when the wing was reassigned to Twelfth Air Force. One month later, the wing and C-130 crew training moved to Little Rock Air Force Base.

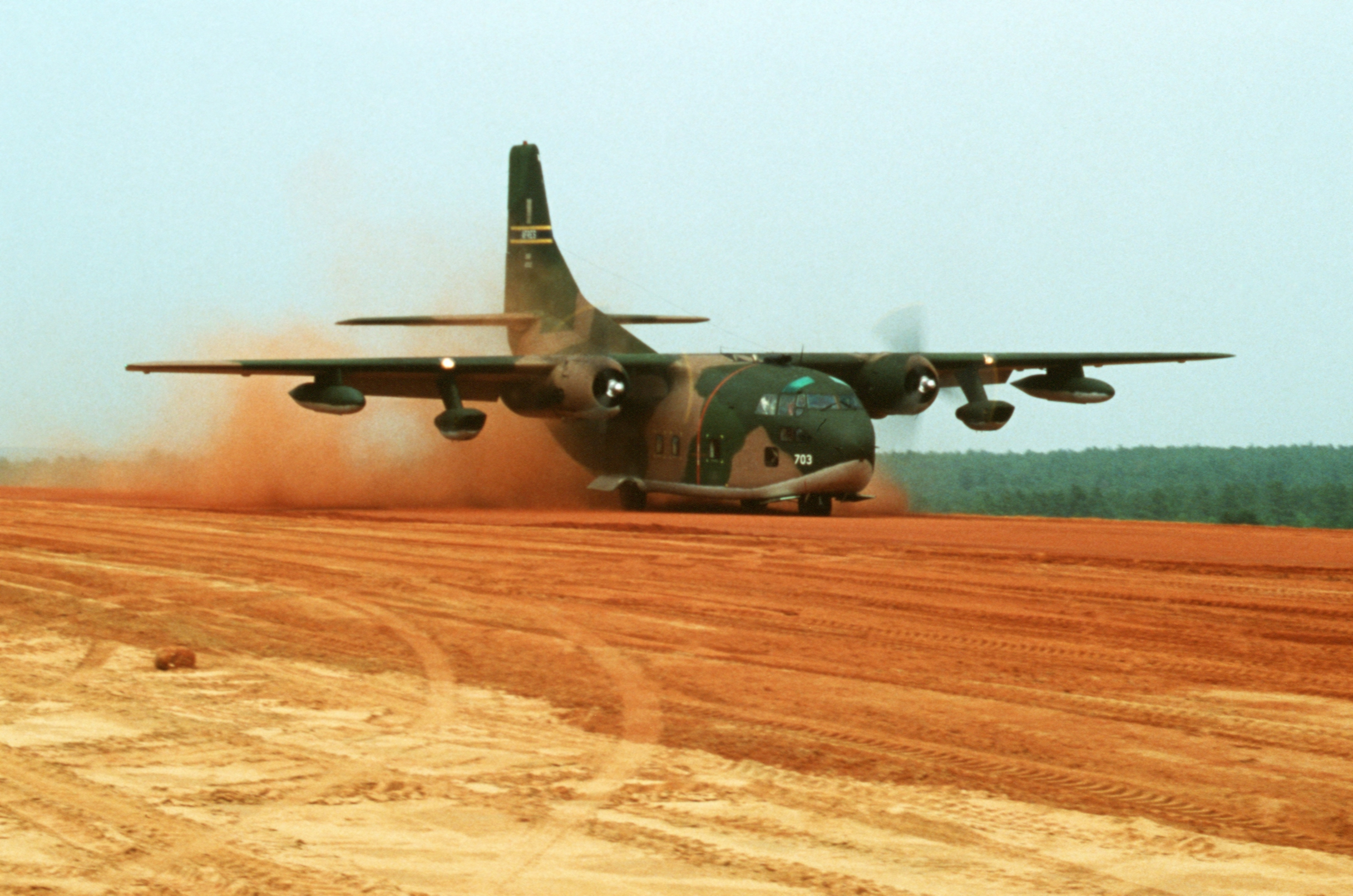
C-123K Provider

As American participation in the Vietnam War increased, the division's wings frequently deployed elements as large as squadrons to the Pacific. Finally, in January 1966, the 314th Troop Carrier Wing moved to Ching Chuan Kang Air Base (usually called "CCK") on Taipei and was reassigned. The 314th Wing did not move with all its operational squadrons, however, but assumed command of squadrons already at CCK. Preparing for the wing move, Tactical Air Command organized the Troop Carrier Wing, Provisional, 4413th in December 1965 and attached it to the division on an interim basis. Two of the 314th's squadrons, the 61st and 62d Troop Carrier Squadrons were assigned to the division and attached to the 4413th. In July 1966 the 4413th was replaced by a permanent unit, the 64th Troop Carrier Wing, and the two former 314th Wing squadrons were assigned to the new wing. Three months later, in October 1966 the 313th Troop Carrier Wing, at Forbes Air Force Base, Kansas was activated and assigned to the division. However, while the 313th Wing was working up with the C-130 at Forbes, the 838th Air Division was moved there and the 313th Wing was reassigned to it.

From 1966 to 1971, the division continued to provide "worldwide airlift, aeromedical evacuation, and C-130 Hercules crew training." The 839th also provided C-123 Provider combat crew training from September 1969 until August 1971 for both United States and Republic of Vietnam aircrews. The command was inactivated in December 1974 in conjunction with the transfer of TAC C-130 units to Military Airlift Command.

== Lineage ==
- Established as the 839 Air Division on 26 September 1957

Activated on 8 October 1957
Inactivated on 31 December 1974

=== Assignments ===
- Ninth Air Force, 8 October 1957
- Twelfth Air Force, 1 July 1963
- Ninth Air Force, 9 November 1964
- Twenty-First Air Force, 1 – 31 December 1974

=== Components ===
Wings

- 64th Troop Carrier Wing (later 64 Tactical Airlift Wing): 1 July 1966 – 9 March 1970
- 313th Troop Carrier Wing: 1 October – 9 November 1964

Forbes Air Force Base, Kansas

- 314th Troop Carrier Wing: 8 October 1957 – 27 January 1966 (attached to 315th Air Division after 22 January 1966)
- 316th Tactical Airlift Wing: 31 March 1970 – 31 December 1974

Langley Air Force Base, Virginia

- 317th Tactical Airlift Wing: 31 March 1970 – 31 December 1974

Lockbourne Air Force Base, Ohio until 31 August 1974, then Pope Air Force Base, North Carolina

- 463d Troop Carrier Wing: 15 January 1959 – 1 July 1963
- 464th Troop Carrier Wing (later 464th Tactical Airlift Wing): 9 November 1964 – 31 August 1971 (Note: The AFHRA 839 Air Division Factsheet gives dates of 8 October 1957 – 1 December 1958. It appears that a line was omitted from the Factsheet. These are the dates that the 513th Troop Carrier Wing, located at Sewart, was assigned to the division. Ravenstein, pp. 279–281. The 513th is not on the list of assigned wings in the Factsheet.)

Pope Air Force Base, North Carolina

- 513th Troop Carrier Wing: 8 October 1957 – 1 December 1958
- 516th Troop Carrier Wing: 1 July 1963 – 9 November 1964
- Troop Carrier Wing, Provisional, 4413th: 1 December 1965 – 1 July 1966 (attached)
- 4442d Combat Crew Training Wing: See 4442d School Squadron

Groups

- 314th Air Base Group: 1 December 1965 – 1 July 1967
- 839th Air Base Group (later 839th Combat Support Group): 8 October 1957 – 1 October 1964
- 4442d Combat Crew Training Group: See 4442d School Squadron

Squadrons

- 61st Troop Carrier Squadron: 1 December 1965 – 1 July 1966 (attached to Troop Carrier Wing, Provisional, 4413th)
- 62d Troop Carrier Squadron: 1 December 1965 – 1 July 1966 (attached to Troop Carrier Wing, Provisional, 4413th)
- 4442d School Squadron (later 4442d Combat Crew Training Squadron, 4442d Combat Crew Training Group, 4442d Combat Crew Training Wing): 1 July 1962 – 26 February 1970

=== Stations ===
- Sewart Air Force Base, Tennessee, 8 October 1957
- Pope Air Force Base, North Carolina, 1 July 1969 – 31 December 1974 (Note: The AFHRA Factsheet does not reflect the division move to Pope. However, Sewart closed in 1970. See "Abstract, 4442 Combat [Crew] Training Wing History Jan–Jun 1969". Air Force History Index. (planning for base closing) See also "Abstract, 839 Air Division History Fiscal Year 1973, including 839 AD Brochure, Welcome to Pope AFB". Air Force History Index..)

=== Aircraft ===
- Piasecki H-21 Shawnee, 1957–1959 (Note: The AFHRA 839 Air Division Factsheet gives starting date of 1955, but the Factsheet shows that the division was not activated until 1957.)
- Fairchild C-123 Provider, 1957, 1958–1961
- Lockheed C-130 Hercules, 1957–1974

== See also ==
- List of Lockheed C-130 Hercules operators
- List of United States Air Force air divisions
