= RAF Ramsbury =

Former RAF airbase in England

RAF Ramsbury USAAF Station AAF-469
- Near Marlborough, Wiltshire, United Kingdom
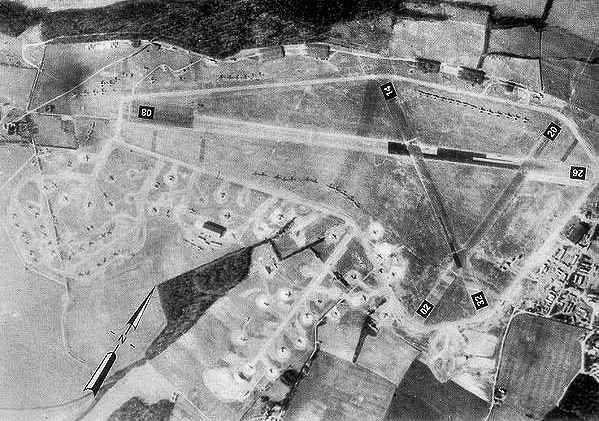
- Ramsbury airfield photographed in May 1944 with west oriented upwards. Taken about a month before D-Day with the airfield full of C-47s and Horsa gliders of the 437th Troop Carrier Group.

Site information
- Type: Royal Air Force station
- Code: RY
- Owner: Air Ministry
- Controlled by: Royal Air Force; United States Army Air Forces

Location
- Location in Wiltshire
- Coordinates: 51.4302°N 1.6198°W

Site history
- Built: 1941
- In use: 1942-1945
- Battles/wars: European Theatre of World War II; Air Offensive, Europe July 1942 - May 1945

Garrison information
- Garrison: Eighth Air Force; Ninth Air Force; RAF Transport Command; RAF Flying Training Command
- Occupants: 64th Troop Carrier Group; 434th/435th Troop Carrier Groups; 437th Troop Carrier Group; No. 23 Group RAF

Royal Air Force Ramsbury or more simply RAF Ramsbury is a former Royal Air Force station, 5 miles (8 km) east-northeast of Marlborough, Wiltshire, England.

Opened in 1942 to the south of Ramsbury village, it was used by both the Royal Air Force and United States Army Air Forces. During the war it was primarily a transport airfield. After the war it was closed in 1946, and today the remains of the airfield are on private land being used as agricultural fields.

== History ==
=== USAAF use ===
Ramsbury was known as USAAF Station AAF-469 for security reasons by the United States Army Air Forces (USAAF) during the war, to avoid naming its location. Its USAAF Station Code was "RY".

==== 64th Troop Carrier Group ====
The airfield was fairly complete when the first operational users arrived. The USAAF Twelfth Air Force 64th Troop Carrier Group, equipped with Douglas C-47 Skytrain and Douglas C-53 Skytrooper, arrived from Westover Army Airfield, Massachusetts on 18 August 1942. Operational squadrons of the group were:

- 16th Troop Carrier Squadron
- 17th Troop Carrier Squadron
- 18th Troop Carrier Squadron
- 35th Troop Carrier Squadron

The unit was temporarily assigned to the VIII Air Support Command for training at Ramsbury, and conducted an extensive training program while flying cargo, passengers, and courier missions for several months, before leaving with paratroopers for Operation Torch, the invasion of North Africa on 9 November 1942, being deployed to Blida Airfield, Algeria.

==== 434th/435th Troop Carrier Groups ====
From November 1943 to January 1944, the airfield was used by the air echelons of the 434th and 435th Troop Carrier Groups from RAF Fulbeck and RAF Langar with C-47s and C-53s. The groups conducted exercises with the 101st Airborne Division.

==== 437th Troop Carrier Group ====
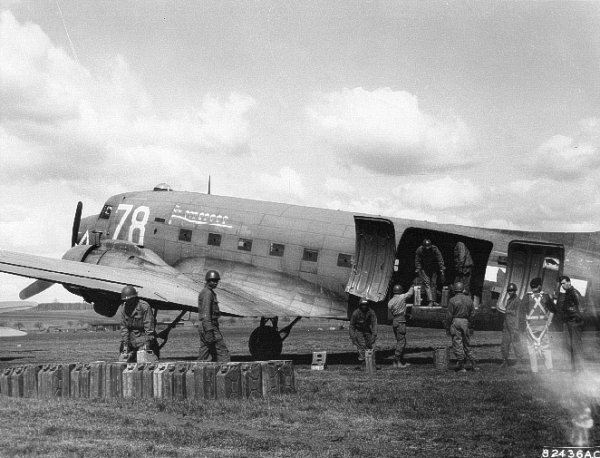
Douglas C-47A of the 84th Troop Carrier Squadron.

On 5 February 1944 the 437th Troop Carrier Group moved to Ramsbury from RAF Balderton. Operational squadrons of the group were:

- 83d Troop Carrier Squadron (T2)
- 84th Troop Carrier Squadron (Z8)
- 85th Troop Carrier Squadron (90)
- 86th Troop Carrier Squadron (5K)

The 437th was a group of Ninth Air Force's 53d Troop Carrier Wing, IX Troop Carrier Command.

The 437th TCS flew a combination of Douglas C-47s and C-53 Skytrains. In February 1945 the group moved to its Advanced Landing Ground at Coulommiers/Voisins, France (ALG A-58).

Ramsbury was retained by IX TCC as a reserve base until the end of hostilities, finally relinquishing it to the RAF in June 1945.

=== Royal Air Force ===
The following units were also here at some point:

- No. 15 (Pilots) Advanced Flying Unit RAF
- No. 1336 Transport Conversion Unit RAF
- No. 1336 (Transport Support) Conversion Unit RAF
- No. 1537 (Beam Approach Training) Flight RAF

== Current use ==
With the end of military control, Ramsbury was returned to agricultural use. By the mid-1960s, much of the concrete had been removed.

Today outlines of the main runways can be discerned on aerial photography, with the perimeter track being reduced largely to a single-lane agricultural road. None of the numerous dispersal pads to the southwest of the airfield remain, and there is no evidence of any of the hangars or the technical site. A very short piece of the end of 32 runway can be seen where the concrete is still at full width, at the intersection with what once was the perimeter track.

A large poultry farm has been erected at the intersection of the 32 end of the NW/SE and 02 end of the NE/SW runways. Several runoff retention ponds are visible with many metal storage silos.

== See also ==
- List of former Royal Air Force stations
- 82nd Airborne Division
- 101st Airborne Division
