= Comiso Airport =

South Silician aerodrome

Comiso Airport Aeroporto di Comiso

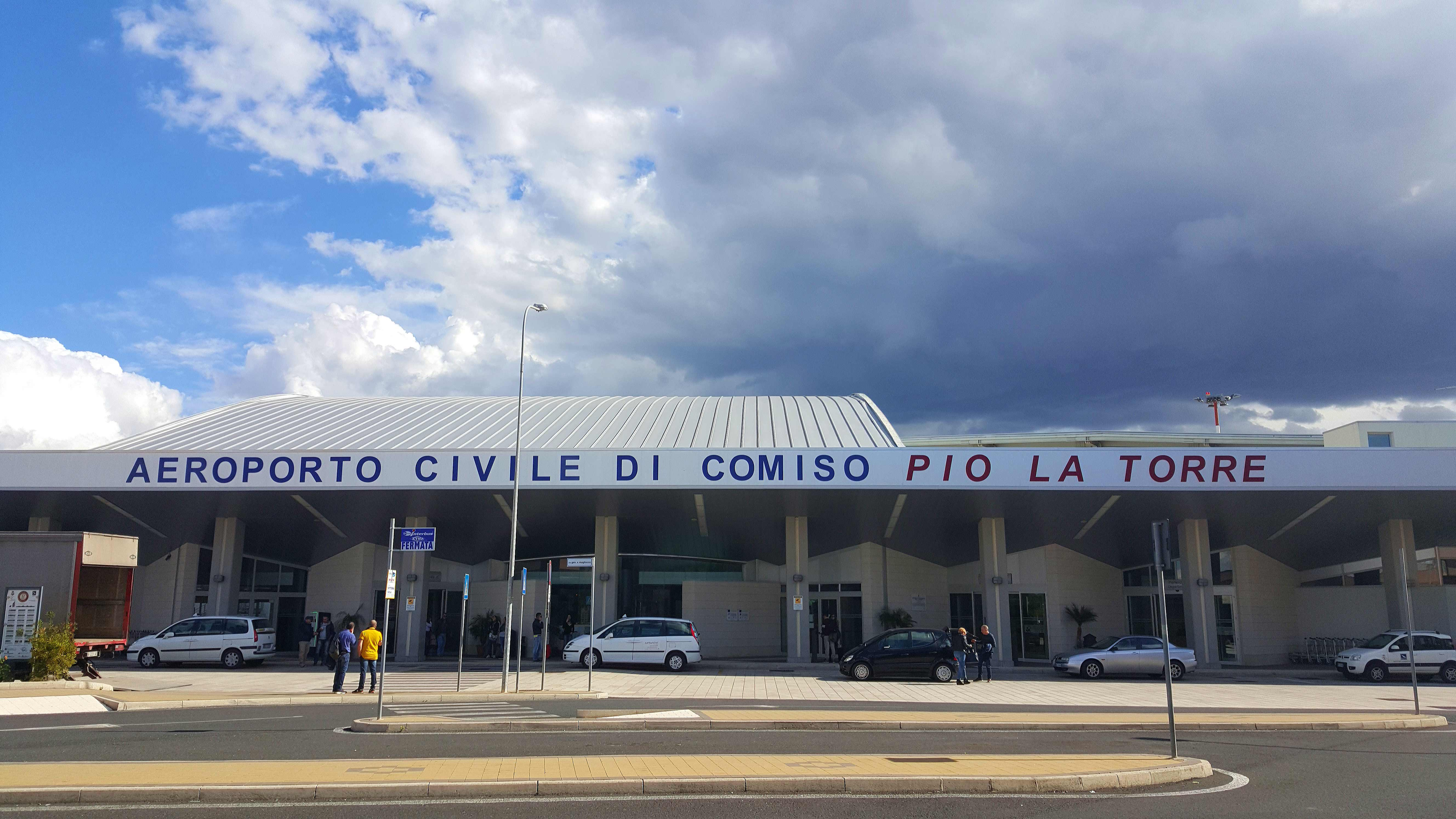
- IATA: CIY; ICAO: LICB

Summary
- Airport type: Public
- Serves: Comiso, Ragusa, Vittoria, Gela
- Location: Comiso, Sicily, Italy
- Opened: 30 May 2013
- Focus city for: Aeroitalia
- Elevation AMSL: 620 ft (190 m)
- Coordinates: 36.991667°N 14.606944°E
- Website: aeroportodicomiso.com

Map
- Location within Sicily Location within Italy

Runways
Direction	Length		Surface
Direction	m	ft	Surface
05/23	2,538	8,326	Asphalt

Statistics (2024)
- Passengers: 260,438
- Passenger change 23-24: ▼ -14.2%
- Aircraft movements: 3,255
- Movements change 23-24: ▼ -6.6%
- Source: Assaeroporti

Comiso Airport "Pio La Torre" (IATA: CIY, ICAO: LICB), also known as Vincenzo Magliocco Airport, is an airport located in the town of Comiso in the Province of Ragusa, Sicily, Italy. The airport serves Comiso (5 km [3.1 mi]), Ragusa (15 km [9.3 mi]), Vittoria and Gela. It changed from military to civil use during 2005–2008. The airport was opened to commercial and general aviation 30 May 2013.

== History ==
=== 1935–1980 ===
The installation began as an aerodrome that was constructed in southeastern Sicily, at the foot of the Hyblaean Mountains ("Monti iblei") and near the city of Comiso. The airport was designed in 1934 under the fascist regime but building works did not start until 1935 and were finished in 1939. Magliocco Aerodromo was dedicated in 1936 and named in honor of Major General Vincenzo Magliocco, the first Sicilian to become a general officer in the Italian Air Force. Magliocco had been killed in the Ethiopian war in 1936.

It became one of several key aerodromes in southern Sicily during the Second World War. German forces were stationed there in 1941, as part of Italy's Axis Alliance, and the German Luftwaffe in 1943 conducted air operations against Allied positions in Maghreb and Malta after its withdrawal from Tunisia.

Aerial bombardments by the Allies rendered the airfield unserviceable on 26 May and 17 June 1943 in preparation for Operation Husky, the allied landings on Sicily. Just after the landing on the nearby Sicilian beaches two Ju 87 Stuka dive bombers took off from Comiso to bomb the landing beaches, only to be met by United States Army troops at the airfield when they landed for rearming and fuel. Ground assault forces of the II Corps, under the command of (then) Lieutenant General Omar Bradley, captured the base on 11 July 1943. Six days later, after quick repairs to the airfield, Allied air forces began operations at Magliocco, designated Comiso Airfield by the Allies, coming under the USAAF Twelfth Air Force. It was primarily used to support airborne and assault glider operations. Known allied units assigned to the base were:

USAAF:

- 340th Bombardment Group, 3–27 August 1943 (B-25 Mitchell)
- 17th Troop Carrier Squadron, 3 September 1943 – 8 July 1944 (C-47 Skytrain)
- 16th Troop Carrier Squadron, 4 September 1943 – 10 July 1944 (C-47 Skytrain)
- 35th Troop Carrier Squadron, 7 September 1943 – 9 January 1945 (C-47 Skytrain)
- 18th Troop Carrier Squadron, 8 September 1943 – 9 January 1945 (C-47 Skytrain)
- 12th Troop Carrier Squadron, 22 October-9 November 1943 (C-47 Skytrain)

RAF:

- No. 43 Squadron (Supermarine Spitfire)
- No. 111 Squadron, (Supermarine Spitfire)
- No. 243 Squadron, (Supermarine Spitfire)
- No. 3201 Servicing Commando, Royal Air Force Serving Commandos

The airfield remained under Allied control when they left in early 1945.

The airfield and facilities at Magliocco fell into disuse during the postwar years. In 1954 Alitalia, the Italian national airline, began commercial operations there. The facilities were extended, with a runway that was to be 1,740 m (5,710 ft) long, the airport was opened to civil aviation. The airport was also a base for the 41st Storm of Catania (Italian Air Force), until 1973. However, the airport was little used.

=== 1981–1991 ===
During the Cold War, in December of 1979, it was officially selected as the second European main operating base for BGM-109G Ground Launched Cruise Missiles (GLCM), deployed by the North Atlantic Treaty Organization in response to the development and deployment of new intercontinental and intermediate range missiles by the Soviet Union.

On 17 March 1982, Commander George W. Holland, of the U.S. Navy Civil Engineering Corps, arrived at Comiso as the resident officer in charge of construction (ROICC). The Air Force activated the 7024th Special Activities Squadron at nearby NAS Sigonella in May 1982 as a primary point of contact and liaison with Lelio Lagorio the Italian Minister of Defence regarding initial site preparations at Comiso. At Comiso, the buildings on the base were almost all bombed out shells and the runway had trees growing out of it. A few of the old buildings were refurbished and used by the USAF or the Italian Air Force, but most were demolished carefully, because of the large amount of Second World War unexploded ordnance, a new base was constructed from the ground up, which was completed on 13 August 1982. After demolition, limited facilities were constructed for the establishment of an interim base support facility or "porta-cabin city" for the 1983 summer arrival of the United States Air Force 487th Combat Support Group.

The first permanently assigned U.S. military personnel arrived in April 1983 in the early stages of the construction of the base. There was a small Italian Air Force contingent there at that time, along with a U.S. Navy construction office. The 487th Combat Support Group was assigned to Comiso Air Station in May 1983; their efforts led to the 30 June 1983 activation of the 487th Tactical Missile Wing. Construction of permanent facilities began that summer, with the first major support facilities, which included the first two dormitories which were completed in late 1983. These facilities belonged to the first of three increments of construction, which would activate the wing and base in stages.

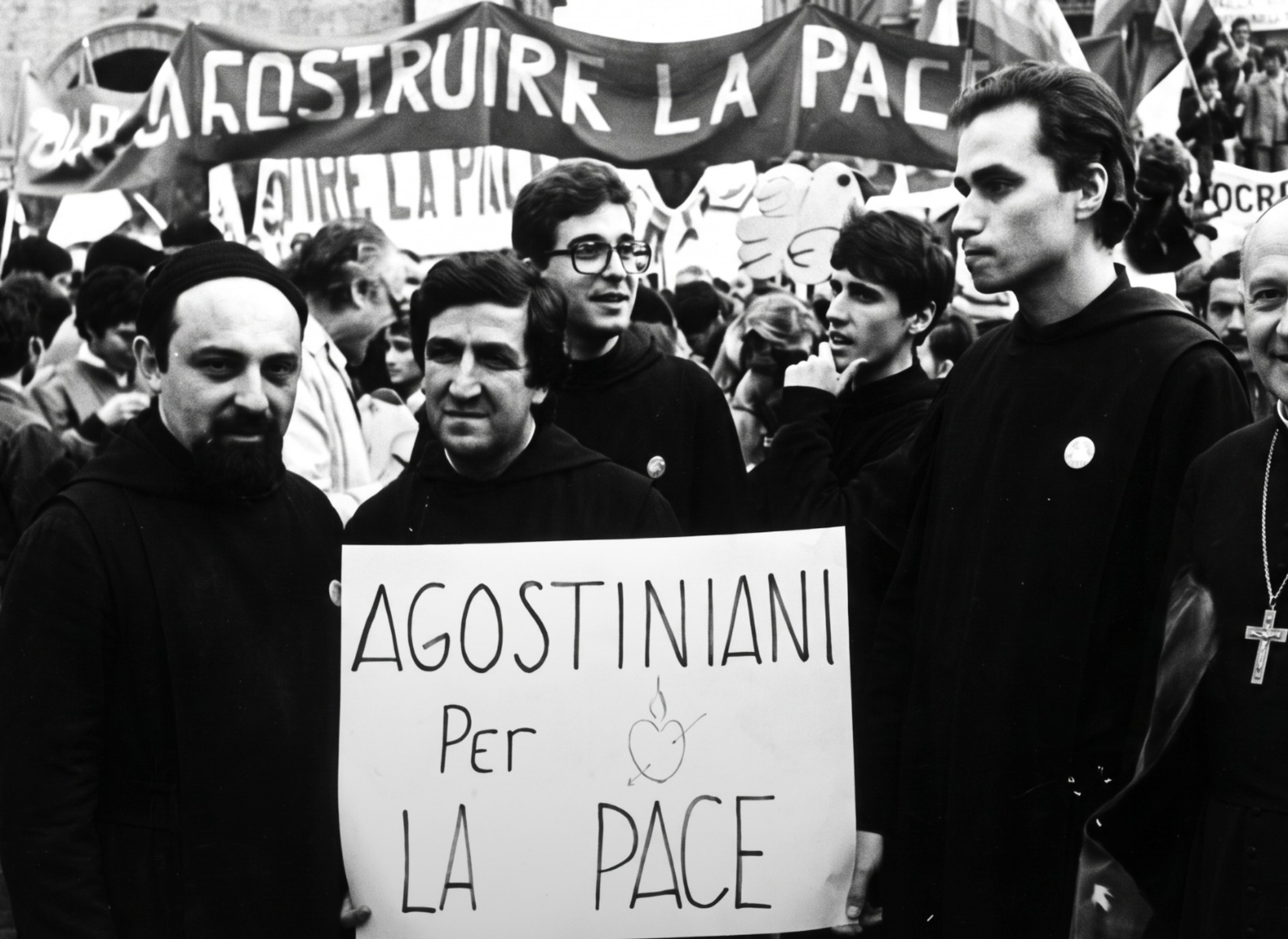
Augustinian Friars, including the future Pope Leo XIV, protesting the installation of NATO missiles in Cosimo.

During the summer of 1983, three large anti-nuclear demonstrations, initiated by the Italian Communist Youth Federation but later joined by members of the Italian Confederation of Trades Unions were conducted around the base perimeter, with as many as 5,000 protesters at the events in late July, August and September. The Communist mayor of Comiso, Giagomo Cagnes, was also a major coordinator of the protest movement. The actions of NATO also lead to widespread protests throughout Europe, including Rome, London, and Vienna. Robert Prevost, the future Pope Leo XIV, participated in the protests in Rome. After these three demonstrations, which also involved a large number of Italian police, both local and national, the protesters appeared to lose interest and only a few very small incidents took place over the following years.

From 1983 to 1991, Comiso Air Base was the largest NATO base in southern Europe and housed 112 BGM-109G Ground Launched Cruise Missiles. Comiso Air Station was a very tightly controlled facility with a large security presence assigned due to the mission of the base, and the presence of nuclear-armed missiles which were stored at the base.

The U.S. Air Force 487th Tactical Missile Wing and Italian Air Force host organisation jointly accomplished the NATO GLCM mission at Comiso until the base closed on 30 June 1991, a result of the signing of the Intermediate-range Nuclear Force Treaty in 1987.

In the late 1990s, Comiso was used for the Rainbow Mission (Italian: Missione Arcobaleno), to house 5,000 Kosovars during the war in former Yugoslavia. The refugees were temporarily settled in the abandoned homes of the US military who left in 1991.

=== 1992–present ===
Refurbishment work to reactivate the airport started in 2004 and was completed during the winter of 2008. The new runway is 2,538 m (8,327 ft) long and 60 m (200 ft) wide, (45 m (148 ft) with two hard shoulders, each of 7.5 m (24 ft 7 in)) and has two fast exits (B and C); they connect to a taxiway 38 m (125 ft) wide. An ILS (Instrument Landing System) was installed and a new control tower 19 m (62 ft) high was built.

The first civil flight was made on 30 April 2007, after the necessary tests and the inauguration of the new runway, but the airport was open to the traffic only on 30 May 2013. In 2014, the airport was renamed to honour Pio La Torre, a politician from Palermo who had been assassinated by the Mafia in 1982.

The control tower of Comiso airport in 2008.

==== 2021: Bentley - performance car debut ====
In September 2021, Bentley Motors Ltd debuted its 2022 Bentley Continental GT Speed for selected motoring journalists, using the closed airbase's road system. Various roads were used in a manner that allowed a one-way route with no cross-overs, to test and present different aspects of the car: a straight part for its power and brakes, another flowing part for its chassis and suspension, a skidpad for traction-control-free drifting, and a tight and twisty part for the rear-wheel steering. This necessitated clearing of brush growing through the road surfaces in various places.

==== 2023 Diversions after Catania fire ====
On 17 July 2023, a fire at Catania airport closed the main terminal. A considerable proportion of the air traffic destined for Catania was diverted to Comiso, including flights from non-Schengen countries. Flights were resumed to Catania on 8 August.

== Airlines and destinations ==
The following airlines operate regular scheduled and charter flights at Comiso Airport:

Airlines	Destinations
Aeroitalia	Milan-Linate, Rome-Fiumicino, Turin; Seasonal: Bologna, Cagliari, Pisa
Neos	Seasonal: Milan Malpensa, Verona
Sky Vision	Seasonal charters: Sharm El Sheikh
Smartwings	Seasonal charters: Prague
Transavia	Seasonal: Paris–Orly
Volotea	Seasonal: Lille, Verona
Wizz Air	Milan Malpensa; Seasonal: Katowice, Tirana

== See also ==
- Cold War (1979–1985)
- List of the busiest airports in Italy

== Sources ==
- Maurer, Maurer. Combat Squadrons of the Air Force: World War II. Maxwell Air Force Base, Alabama: Office of Air Force History, 1982.
- Maurer, Maurer, Air Force Combat Units of World War II, Office of Air Force history (1961). ISBN 0-405-12194-6
- Wellum, Geoffrey, First Light, Penguin, London, 2018 (first published 2002) page 331 describing low-level attacks on Comiso.
