= El Djem Airfield =

Abandoned World War II military airfield in Tunisia

El Djem Airfield

Site information
- Type: Military airfield
- Controlled by: United States Army Air Forces

Location
- Coordinates: 35°19′02.17″N 010°40′40.97″E (Approximate)

Site history
- Built: 1943
- In use: 1943-1944

Location of El Djem, Tunisia

El Djem Airfield is an abandoned World War II military airfield in Tunisia, which is located approximately 4 kilometres (2.5 mi) west-northwest of El Djem; about 170 kilometres (110 mi) south-southeast of Tunis. It was a pre-1942 military airfield used by the German Luftwaffe which was attacked and seized by Allied forces in April 1943. Once in Allied hands, it was repaired and used by the United States Army Air Force during the Tunisian Campaign.

Known USAAF units assigned were:

- 57th Fighter Group, 14–21 April 1943, P-40 Warhawk (9th AF)
- 64th Troop Carrier Group, 26 July-29 August 1943, C-47 Skytrain, (12th AF)
- 60th Troop Carrier Group, 30 June-31 August 1943, C-47 Skytrain, (12th AF)

Today, the airfield runway and dispersal pads are faintly visible in aerial photography.
