= Blida Airport =

Airport in Algeria

- IATA: none; ICAO: DAAB

Summary
- Airport type: Military
- Serves: Blida
- Location: Algeria
- Elevation AMSL: 535 ft / 163 m
- Coordinates: 36°30′14″N 2°48′52″E

Map
- Location of Blida Airport in Algeria

Runways
Direction	Length		Surface
Direction	ft	m	Surface
07/25	5,930	1,807	Asphalt
- Source: Landings.com

Blida Airport is an airport in Blida, Algeria (ICAO: DAAB). It undertook a repavement project in 2012.

== History ==
On 8 November 1942, during World War II, the airport was taken by the 11th Infantry Brigade, British Army. The event was part of the Operation Torch of the North African Campaign. Shortly afterwards, Lieutenant B.H.C. Nation, RN, leader of a flight of Grumman Martlets from HMS Victorious, saw white handkerchiefs fluttering on the ground and landed on the airfield. He accepted a written agreement from the French Air Commander that Allied aircraft might land. No. 326 Wing RAF began arriving by 11 November 1942 and soon its four squadrons of Bristol Bisleys were bombing Axis airfields by night.

On 6 December 1942, the 97th Bomb Group's 414th Bomb Squadron Commanding Officer flew from Tafaraoui Airfield at Oran, Algeria to certify the preparation of the "Blida Airfield" ready to receive two 97th Bomb Group Squadrons, the 342nd and the 414th. On 12 December 1942, the 414th Bomb Squadron Commander flew back to Tafaraoui Airfield at Oran, Algeria. The next day, the 342nd and the 414th Bomb Squadrons flew to "Blida Airfield" and prepared for its next day's bombing mission. On 14 December 1942, all four Bomb Squadrons from the 97th Bomb Group departed their respective bases and bombed the Tunis docks in Tunisia and returned to new their new base at Biskra, Algeria.

== See also ==
- List of airports in Algeria
