= 1st Troop Carrier Group (Provisional) =

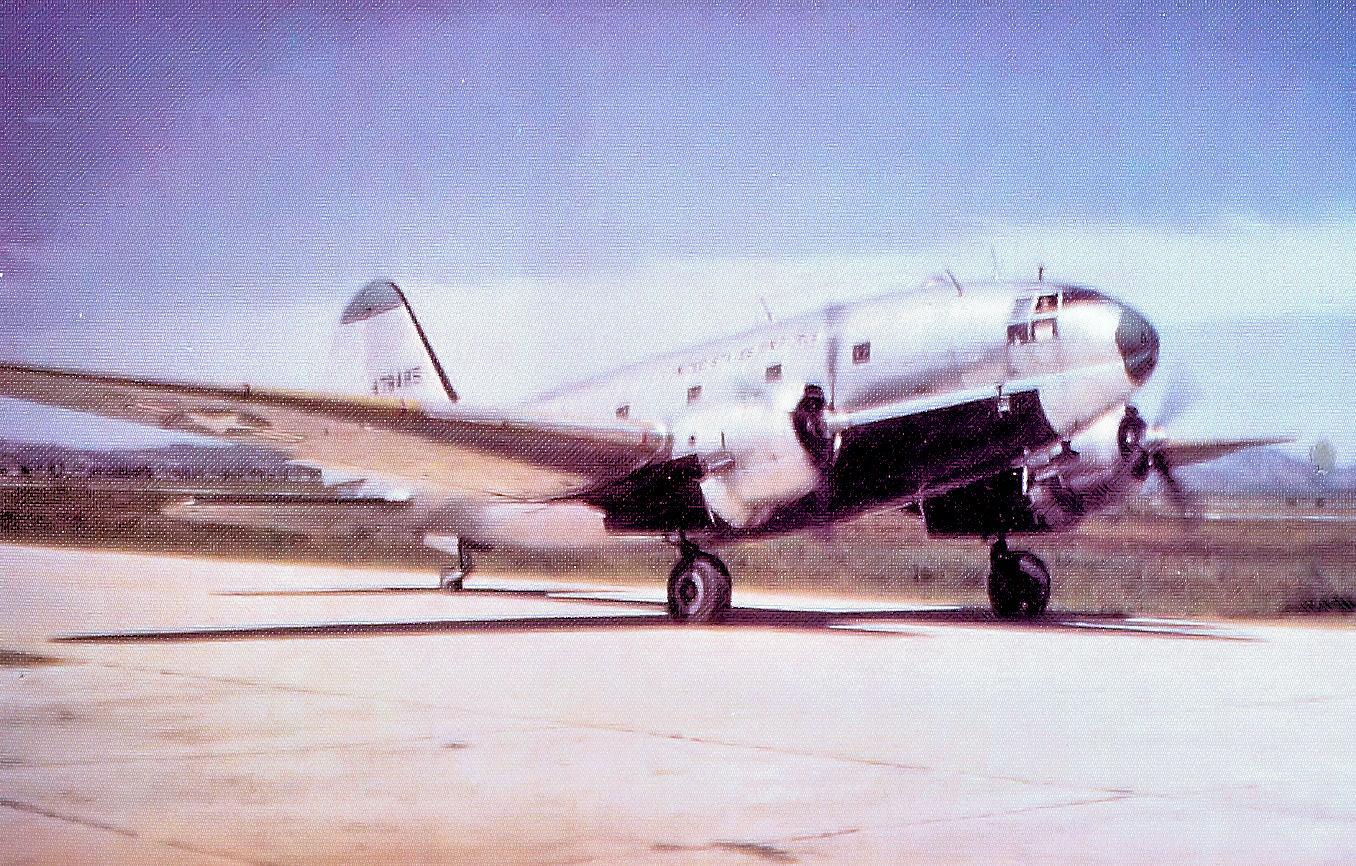
- C-46D Commando on a South Korean airstrip
- Active: 1950–1951
- Country: United States
- Branch: United States Air Force
- Role: Airlift
- Part of: Far East Air Forces
- Engagements: Korean War

The 1st Troop Carrier Group (Provisional) was a United States Air Force unit formed in Japan shortly after the beginning of the Korean War, drawing from resources throughout the Pacific, to augment the airlift capability of Far East Air Forces. It airlifted troops and equipment in Japan and Korea, operating from its home station of Tachikawa Air Base, Japan and forward locations in Korea. It flew courier missions and evacuated wounded from the battle area.

In late November, the group moved a Marine Corps unit to North Korea. When the Chinese counterattack force United Nations forces to retreat, it helped evacuate elements of the X Corps from North Korea. The unit was discontinued in early 1951 following the arrival in theater of reserve airlift units that had been mobilized for the war and most of its remaining resources were incorporated into those units.

== Background ==
The planning for the Inchon Landing included an airdrop by the 187th Airborne Regimental Combat Team, which would be supported by the 314th Troop Carrier Group, flying new Fairchild C-119 Flying Boxcars. However both these units were still in the United States. The 314th had the capability to airdrop 2700 paratroopers. The United States Army notified the Air Force that the 187th and supporting troops would have a strength of 3500, plus heavy equipment which would also need to be airdropped, which would require 140 C-119s or their equivalents. The Air Force agreed to increase the 314th's strength from 64 to 96 C-119s, but informed Far East Air Forces (FEAF) that it would have to provide the remaining airlift from its own resources. Moreover, General MacArthur informed FEAF that once his forces were established in Korea, they would require 700 to 1,000 tons of airlifted cargo each day on a continuing basis. In response, FEAF converted the 374th Troop Carrier Wing's 21st Troop Carrier Squadron from Douglas C-124 Globemaster IIs to Douglas C-47 Skytrains and organized the 1st Troop Carrier Group (Provisional).

== History ==
The 1st Group was organized as a provisional unit at Ashiya Air Base, Japan on 26 August 1950, although it immediately moved to Tachikawa Air Base, from which it and its three squadrons operated until it was discontinued. The group was under the operational control of the 1st Troop Carrier Task Force (Provisional), but was attached to the 374th Troop Carrier Wing at Tachikawa for support. Personnel and equipment drawn from Thirteenth Air Force in the Philippines, Twentieth Air Force on Guam and Far East Air Materiel Command in Japan were used to man the group.

Using Curtiss C-46 Commandos (and briefly Douglas C-47 Skytrains) the group began airlifting freight and passengers between Japan and Korea on 2 September 1950. The group transported a United States Marine Corps unit to Pyongyang, North Korea on 25 and 26 November, then flew emergency air evacuations from Sinanju (K-29) and other forward bases as the Chinese advanced. Pressure from advancing advancing People's Liberation Army (PLA) required the evacuation of The pressure from the PLA made evacuation by sea without augmentation by airlift impractical. On 14 December, air evacuation of X Corps from Yonpo Airfield (K-27) began. The air evacuation ended three days later, when X Corps was no longer able to secure Yonpo. The evacuating crews maintained a twenty-four hour operation with airplanes taking off every five minutes in what was usually bad weather. Aircrews had to assist with the loading of their planes to speed departures. The fatigue brought on by these operations ultimately resulted in the hospitalization of a number of group pilots. (Note: The regular Air Force units participating in this action, the 314th Troop Carrier Group, 21st Troop Carrier Squadron, and 801st Medical Air Evacuation Squadron were all awarded the Distinguished Unit Citation for their participation.)

Leaving its deployed location at Kimpo Air Base (K-14), on 4 January 1951 Korea, the group was discontinued on 25 January. This was part of a reorganization of airlift units in Far East Air Force in which provisional units, such as the group, which used equipment and personnel of other units on a temporary basis, were replaced by permanent units.

Many of the group's personnel transferred to the 86th Troop Carrier Squadron, which was activated in its place (Note: The 86th was a new squadron, as the 437th Group expanded from three to four squadrons. Futrell, p. 383.) and which was assigned to the 437th Troop Carrier Group, a reserve unit that had been mobilized for the war and which had moved to Brady Air Base, Japan in November 1950. In its five months of operation, the group carried over 28,000 passengers, 7,000 air evacuees, and almost 12,000 tons of cargo.

== Lineage ==
- Designated by Far East Air Forces as the 1st Troop Carrier Group (Provisional), Medium and organized on 26 August 1950

Redesignated Troop Carrier Group, Medium No. 1 (Provisional)
Discontinued on 25 January 1951

=== Assignments ===
- 1st Troop Carrier Task Force (Provisional) (attached to 374th Troop Carrier Wing), 26 August 1950
- Far East Combat Cargo Command (Provisional) (attached to 374th Troop Carrier Wing), c. 10 September 1950 – 25 January 1951

=== Components ===
- 46th Troop Carrier Squadron (Provisional), 26 August 1950 – 6 October 1950
- 47th Troop Carrier Squadron (Provisional), 26 August 1950 – 25 January 1951
- 48th Troop Carrier Squadron (Provisional), 26 August 1950 – 10 January 1951

=== Stations ===
- Ashiya Air Base, Japan, 26 August 1950
- Tachikawa Air Base, Japan, 26 August 1950 – 25 January 1951

=== Aircraft ===
- Curtiss C-46 Commando, 1950-1951
- Douglas C-47 Skytrain, 1950

=== Commanders ===
- Col. Cecil H. Childre, 26 August 1950 – 21 October 1950
- Lt. Col. Edward H. Nigro, 21 October 1950 – 25 January 1951

=== Campaigns ===
Campaign Streamer	Campaign	Dates	Notes
	UN Defensive	26 August 1950 – 15 September 1950	
	UN Offensive	16 September 1950 – 2 November 1950	
	CCF Intervention	3 November 1950 – 24 January 1951	

== See also ==
- United States Air Force In South Korea
