= 374th Airlift Wing =

374th Airlift Wing

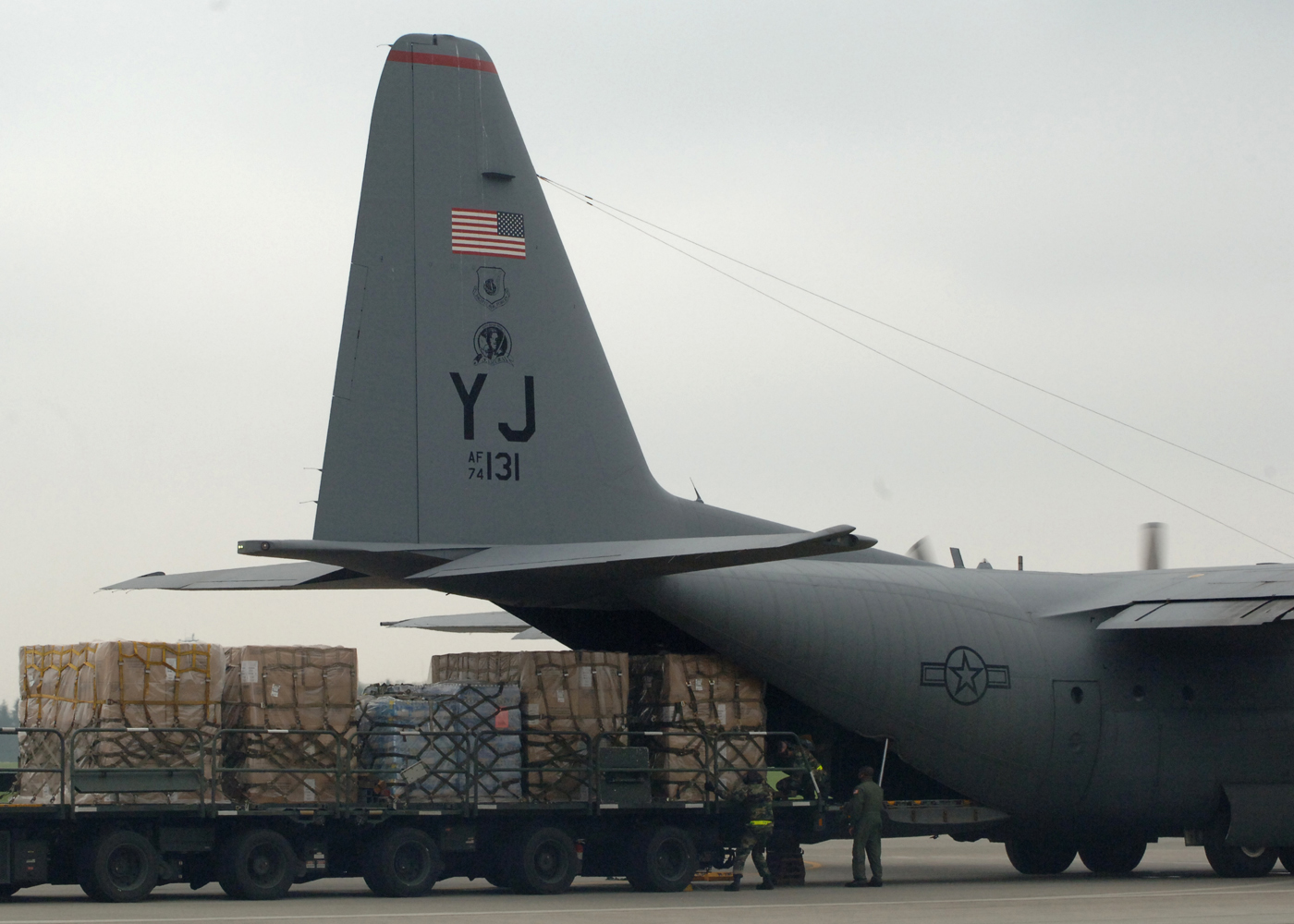
- Wing airmen load a C-130J Super Hercules for shipment to Niigata Airport on 18 July 2007. The 374 AW provided 10,000 pounds of water and 100 air conditioning units to the Government of Japan after an earthquake hit one of Japan's largest cities on the Sea of Japan.
- Active: 1948–1957; 1966–present
- Country: United States
- Branch: United States Air Force
- Role: Airlift
- Part of: Pacific Air Forces
- Garrison/HQ: Yokota Air Base Japan
- Motto: Celeriter Pugnare (Latin for 'Swiftly to Fight')
- Engagements: Korean War
- Decorations: Presidential Unit Citation; Air Force Outstanding Unit Award with Combat "V" Device; Philippine Presidential Unit Citation; Republic of Korea Presidential Unit Citation; Republic of Vietnam Gallantry Cross with Palm

Commanders
- Current commander: Col. Daniel E. Mendoza

Insignia
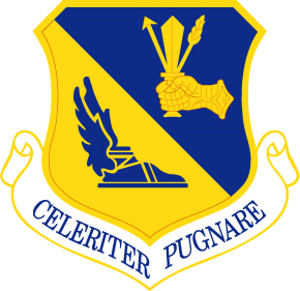
- 374th Airlift Wing emblem (Note: Approved 20 December 1951.)

The 374th Airlift Wing is a unit of the United States Air Force assigned to Fifth Air Force. It is stationed at Yokota Air Base, Japan. It is part of Pacific Air Forces. The 374th Airlift Wing is the only airlift wing in PACAF and provides airlift support to all Department of Defense agencies in the Pacific theater of operation. It also provides transport for people and equipment throughout the Kantō Plain and the Tokyo metropolitan area.

The Wing participates in operations involving air, land and airdrop of troops, equipment, supplies, and support or augment special operations forces, when appropriate. It fields a provisional airlift wing or group headquarters (when required) to command airlift resources as units in support of contingencies or exercises. It also supports assigned, attached, and associate units on Yokota Air Base and satellite installations according to higher headquarters' direction.

The 374th Airlift Wing has never been stationed in the United States.

== Mission ==
The mission of the 374th Airlift Wing is to provide command and control of subordinate units for the execution of troop, cargo, military equipment, passengers, mail, and aeromedical evacuation/airlift to and from areas requiring such airlift.

== Units ==
- 374th Operations Group
  - 36th Airlift Squadron (C-130J) (YJ)
  - 319th Expeditionary Reconnaissance Squadron
  - 374th Operations Support Squadron
  - 459th Airlift Squadron (UH-1N, C-12)
- 374th Maintenance Group
- 374th Mission Support Group
- 374th Medical Group

== History ==
The 374th Troop Carrier Wing was established on 10 August 1948 and activated on 17 August. It operated Harmon Field, Guam, until March 1949, and provided troop carrier operations in the Pacific and Far East. It moved to Japan in March 1949, and assumed control over Tachikawa Air Base, operating this facility until 1 January 1956.

=== Korean War ===
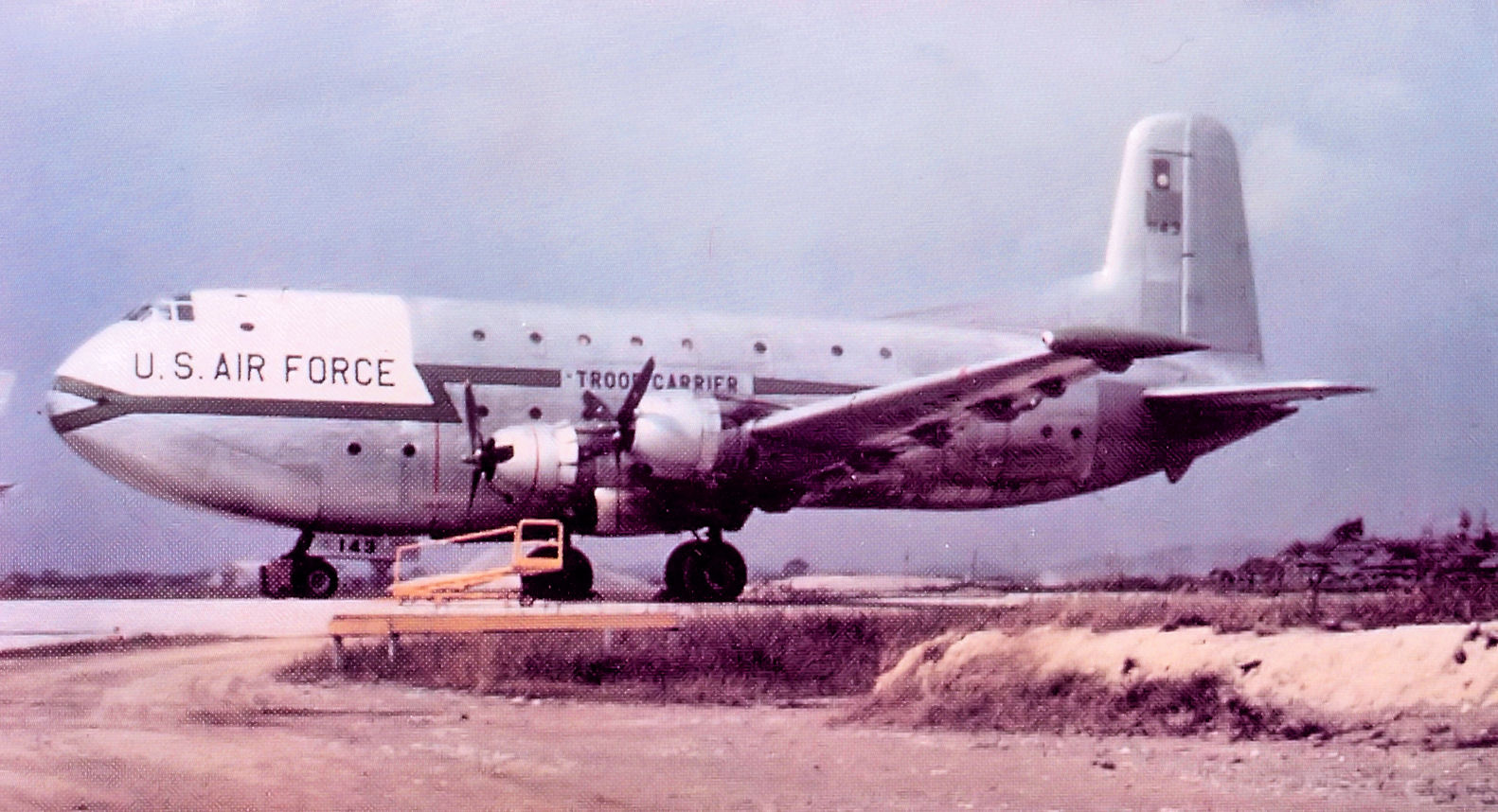
Wing C-124A Globemaster II (Note: Aircraft is Douglas C-124A-DL Globemaster II serial 51-143. The picture appears to have been taken at an airfield in South Korea in 1952.)

When the Korean War broke out in June 1950, the 374th was the only air transport group in the Far East. During the war, the combat components of the unit were:

- 1st Troop Carrier Group (Provisional): attached 26 August 1950 – 10 January 1951.
- 21st Troop Carrier Squadron: attached 29 June 1951 – 28 March 1952.
- 47th Troop Carrier Squadron, Provisional: attached 10–26 January 1951.
- 6142d Air Transport Unit: attached 1 August – 1 October 1950.
- 6143d Air Transport Unit: attached 26 July – 1 October 1950.
- 6144th Air Transport Unit: attached 26 July – 1 October 1950.

The Wing's assigned and attached components flew a variety of aircraft, including Douglas C-54 Skymasters, Curtiss C-46 Commandos, Douglas C-47 Skytrains, Fairchild C-119 Flying Boxcars, and Douglas C-124 Globemaster IIs, performing combat airlift, airdrops, and aeromedical evacuation in Korea throughout the war.

The wing performed routine transport operations. With assigned and attached components, the wing performed combat airlift, airdrops, and aeromedical evacuation in Korea throughout the war. For its work between 27 June and 15 September 1950, transporting vital cargo, personnel and evacuating wounded men, the 374th earned a Distinguished Unit Citation.

It also flew courier flights throughout the Pacific area. In April 1953, the 374th transported the first of several groups of repatriated prisoners of war from Korea to Japan (Operation Little Switch), and subsequently transported United Nations prisoners of war (Operation Big Switch) from North Korea.

=== Cold War ===
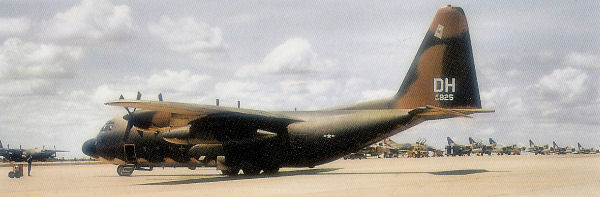
345th Squadron C-130 Hercules{{efn}Aircraft is Lockheed C-130E-LM Hercules, serial 63-7825 at Ching Chuan Kang Air Base, Taiwan.}}

Following hostilities, the wing resumed its normal troop carrier and airlift operations in the Far East and Pacific area, including participation in tactical exercises and humanitarian missions.

Beginning in January 1954, the 374th airlifted wounded French troops from Indochina to Japan, en route to France. Principal operations from 1955 until 1958 consisted of numerous mobility exercises, routine theater airlift, and occasional exercises throughout the Western Pacific region. It trained C-46 pilots of the Japanese Air Self Defense Force, from November 1954 through May 1955.

==== Vietnam War ====
Nine years later, in August 1966, the 374th Troop Carrier Wing was reactivated at Naha Air Base, Okinawa as part of the 315th Air Division, and assumed a mission of airlift to Southeast Asia, as well as intra-theater airlift for elements of the Pacific Command. In addition, the wing supported Army Special Forces training, participated in tactical exercises, and flew search and rescue and humanitarian missions as needed.

The wing controlled four troop carrier squadrons, the 21st, 35th, 41st troop Carrier Squadron and 817th Troop Carrier Squadrons. The 21st included a special flight which supplied aircraft for CIA operations. The Wing also known as the "Blind Bats" supported several special missions, including psychological operations, flare support, HALO and other missions, some of which were highly classified. In 1967 the troop carrier designation was replaced by tactical airlift throughout the Air Force. During the Vietnam War the 374th received the Presidential Unit Citation and the Air Force Outstanding Unit Award.

On 12 May 1968 airlifters in Vietnam as they were called upon to evacuate the camp at Kham Duc. Although two C-130s, one of which was from the 374th, were shot down and others were damaged, they managed to bring out about half of the camp's defenders while Army and Marine Corps helicopters brought out the remainder who did not exfiltrate on the ground. Lt. Col. Daryl D. Cole was awarded the MacKay Trophy for the most meritorious flight of the year for flying his badly damaged Lockheed C-130A Hercules out of Kham Duc. Lt. Col. John Delmore's crew crash landed at Kham Duc but were quickly rescued by Army personnel.

The wing had no aircraft from 27 April to 31 May 1971. It was revived with new resources at Ching Chuan Kang Air Base Taichung, Taiwan and remained heavily committed in support of operations in Southeast Asia during the Vietnam War, and also continued routine airlift in other areas. One of the wing's humanitarian missions-flood relief in the Philippines earned it a Philippine Republic Presidential Unit Citation in 1972.

In the spring of 1972, after most American ground forces had been withdrawn, the North Vietnamese Communists launched a major offensive as they invaded South Vietnam during Easter. Communist troops supported by tanks and artillery rolled down Highway 13 toward Saigon, only to be halted after passing the town of An Lộc, which fell under siege. Airlift forces in Southeast Asia had been withdrawn, with only the 374th Tactical Airlift Wing remaining of what had been several wings of C-130s, Fairchild C-123 Providers and de haviland Canada C-7 caribouss. Vietnamese C-123s attempted to supply the besieged garrison at An Lộc, but were unsuccessful in the face of the heaviest ground fire yet encountered in the Vietnam War. Helicopter resupply was impossible due to the proliferation of automatic weapons in the area. In desperation, Military Assistance Command, Vietnam, ordered the 374th to begin a resupply effort of the camp.

The wing provided support in March 1973 for Operation Homecoming, the repatriation of American prisoners of war (POW) from Hanoi, North Vietnam. In February 1973, the POWs, some of whom had been held since 1965, were finally released. Military Airlift Command (MAC) was given the honor of bringing the POWs home, but the MAC Lockheed C-141 Starlifter crews were upstaged by C-130 crewmen from the 374th. In preparation for the release, several C-130 flights transported members of the negotiating team into Hanoi. On the day of the release two C-130 crews flew into Gia Lam Airport with members of the release team and an Air Force combat control team who brought in homing devices to help the MAC crews find the airfield. When the prisoners were released, the two C-130 crews were standing with nothing to do. Seeing that the first prisoners were the most badly injured, SSgt Ron Zogoda, a loadmaster, took the initiative as he stepped forward and took the arm of the first prisoner to be released, then escorted him across more than 100 feet of tarmac to where the MAC "freedom birds" waited. (The MAC C-141 crews were under strict instructions not to leave their airplanes.) The other members of the two crews followed Zgoda's lead. When the POWs got to their first stop at Clark Air Base, Philippines, they told Gen. William G. Moore Jr., commander of Thirteenth Air Force, how they appreciated the fact that the first Americans they talked too were combat crewmembers like themselves. Consequently, on subsequent releases, the C-130 crews were assigned escort duty with the returning prisoners.

The 374th maintained a forward operating location at Korat Royal Thai Air Force Base Thailand until 1976. While American combat participation in the Vietnam War ceased with the 1973 ceasefire, airlift continued to play a role in the ongoing war in nearby Laos and Cambodia. Throughout 1974 and into 1975 the United States maintained a major airlift of supplies to the besieged Cambodian city of Phnom Penh from the U-Tapao Royal Thai Navy Airfield. Fearful of the loss of an Air Force crew, the United States turned to the use of civilian contract crews, as they had done during the French IndoChina War. A company known as BirdAir recruited former military airlifters to fly USAF C-130s provided "on loan" from the Air Force for the resupply effort. In spite of the airlift effort, Phnom Penh fell to the Khmer Rouge on 17 April 1975, only a few days before Saigon also fell, bringing the Vietnam War to a final conclusion.

The unit participated in Operation Baby Lift (evacuation of Vietnam orphans) and Operation New Life (evacuation of Vietnamese refugees) in April 1975. During the recovery of the SS Mayaguez from the Khmer Rouge in May 1975, a wing aircraft dropped a 15,000-lb bomb on Koh Tang Island.

On 31 March 1975, the 374th gained an aeromedical airlift mission in the Far East. In October 1978, it added a tactical airlift group to control the wing's units in Japan and South Korea, and continued controlling aerial port facilities in South Korea until November 1983, and then in the Philippines and Japan.

It began supporting US Navy elements in the Indian Ocean area in 1980. From 30 December 1990 through 6 July 1991, the wing deployed C-130s and associated aircrews and support personnel for operations in Southwest Asia, and in May, the wing was deployed in support of the humanitarian mission Operation Sea Angel. From 8 June through 1 July 1991 the wing provided airlift and aeromedical airlift for the evacuation of Clark Air Base, Philippines, after the eruption of Mount Pinatubo.

On 1 April 1992 the 374th absorbed the personnel and mission of 475th Air Base Wing, which was inactivated under the objective wing organizational concept and became the host unit at Yokota Air Base. From 1992 to present, the 374th Airlift Wing conducted special operations, aeromedical evacuations, search and rescue operations, humanitarian relief and theater airlift missions in support of US and UN security interests throughout the Far East.

In 1996, the 374th deployed portions of the Air Transportable Hospital to Andersen AFB, Guam to assist in Operation Pacific Haven, transportation of more than 2000 Kurdish nationals. Deployed to U-Tapao Royal Thai Navy Airfield, Thailand from 28 December 2004 though 26 January 2005 as part of Operation Unified Assistance, distributing humanitarian supplies to people and eleven nations devastated by an earthquake triggered tsunami.

=== Twenty-first century ===
Building Partnerships: In 2022 USAF and Bangladesh Air Force BAF conducted tactical airlift exercise Cope South 22. Approximately 77 U.S. Airmen along with two U.S. Air Force C-130J Super Hercules from the 36th Airlift Squadron (AS) of 374th Airlift Wing joined approximately 300 Bangladesh armed forces personnel and 2 BAF C-130Js for the exercise.

== Lineage ==
- Established as the 374th Troop Carrier Wing, Heavy on 10 August 1948

Activated on 17 August 1948
Inactivated on 1 July 1957

- Redesignated 374th Troop Carrier Wing and activated, on 27 June 1966 (not organized

Organized on 8 August 1966
Redesignated 374th Tactical Airlift Wing on 1 August 1967
Redesignated 374th Airlift Wing on 1 April 1992

=== Assignments ===
- Marianas Air Materiel Area (Provisional), 17 August 1948 (attached to Twentieth Air Force)
- Marianas Air Materiel Area, 1 February 1949 (remained attached to Twentieth Air Force)
- Fifth Air Force, 5 March 1949 (attached to: 1 Troop Carrier Task Force (Provisional), 5–9 September 1950, Far East Air Forces Combat Cargo Command, Provisional after 10 September 1950)
- 314th Air Division, 1 December 1950 (remained attached to Far East Air Forces Combat Cargo Command, Provisional)
- 315th Air Division, 25 January 1951 – 1 July 1957
- Pacific Air Forces, 27 June 1966 (not organized)
- 315th Air Division, 8 August 1966
- 313th Air Division, 1 November 1968
- 327th Air Division, 31 May 1971
- Thirteenth Air Force, 15 November 1973
- Twenty-Second Air Force, 31 March 1975
- 834th Airlift Division, 1 October 1978
- Fifth Air Force, 1 April 1992 – present

=== Components ===
Groups

- 1st Troop Carrier Group, Medium (Provisional) (later Troop Carrier Group (Medium), No. 1, Provisional): attached 26 August 1950 – 10 January 1951
- 316th Tactical Airlift Group: 1 October 1978 – 1 October 1989
- 374th Troop Carrier Group (later 374th Operations Group): 17 August 1948 – 1 July 1957; 1 April 1992 – present

Squadrons

Korean War through 1957

- 6th Troop Carrier Squadron: attached 3 February 1956 – 1 July 1957
- 21st Troop Carrier Squadron: attached 29 June 1951 – 28 March 1952, 3 February 1956 – 1 July 1957
- Troop Carrier Squadron (Medium), No. 47, Provisional: attached 10–26 January 1951
- 6475th Flying Training Squadron (later 6037th Flying Training Squadron): attached 25 November 1954 – 18 May 1955
- 6485th Operations Squadron: attached 17 September 1956 – 1 July 1957

Assigned during Vietnam War

- 21st Troop Carrier Squadron (later 21st Tactical Airlift Squadron, 21st Airlift Squadron): 8 August 1966 – 1 April 1992
- 35th Tactical Airlift Squadron: 8 August 1966 – 31 March 1971
- 41st Tactical Airlift Squadron: 8 August 1966 – 28 February 1971
- 50th Tactical Airlift Squadron: 31 May 1971 – 15 August 1973
- 345th Tactical Airlift Squadron: 31 May 1971 – 1 October 1978
- 776th Tactical Airlift Squadron: 31 May 1971 – 31 October 1975
- 815th Tactical Airlift Squadron: 1 November 1968 – 15 December 1969 (detached until 1 April 1969)
- 817th Tactical Airlift Squadron: 8 August 1966 – 15 June 1970

Attached during Vietnam War

- 22d Troop Carrier Squadron: 3 February 1956 – 1 July 1957
- 36th Tactical Airlift Squadron: 16 May – 1 September 1972
- 37th Tactical Airlift Squadron: 29 November 1972 – 28 February 1973
- 38th Tactical Airlift Squadron: 1 September – 29 November 1972
- 61st Tactical Airlift Squadron: 16 May – 1 September 1972
- 772d Tactical Airlift Squadron: c. 10 May – 6 June 1973
- 773d Tactical Airlift Squadron: 28 February – c. 10 May 1973

Post-Vietnam War

- 7th Airborne Command and Control Squadron: 22 May 1974 – 31 March 1975 (attached to Thirteenth Air Force)
- 13th Military Airlift Squadron: 1 October 1987 – 1 April 1992
- 20th Operations Squadron (later 20th Aeromedical Airlift Squadron): 31 March 1975 – 1 April 1992
- 50th Tactical Airlift Squadron: attached 28 April – c. 6 June 1975
- 345th Tactical Airlift Squadron: 1 October 1989 – 1 April 1992
- 1403d Military Airlift Squadron: 1 October 1989 – 1 April 1992

Units

- 6142d Air Transport Unit: attached 1 August – 1 October 1950
- 6143d Air Transport Unit: attached 26 July – 1 October 1950
- 6144th Air Transport Unit: attached 26 July – 1 October 1950

Flight

- 22d Helicopter Flight: 1 April – 1 July 1992
- 337th Air Support Flight: 1994-onwards. Located in Canberra, Australia. Provides education, medical and personnel administrative, and logistical support to all United States Air Force, Army, Navy, Marine Corps, Space Force, and DOD active duty military, civilian, and retired personnel in Australia.

Detachments

- Royal Thai Air Force Detachment: attached 1953 – 1 July 1957

=== Stations ===
- Harmon Field (later Harmon AFB), Guam, Marianas Islands, 17 August 1948
- Tachikawa (later, Tachikawa AB), Japan, 5 March 1949 – 1 July 1957
- Naha Air Base, Okinawa, 8 August 1966
- Ching Chuan Kang Air Base, Taiwan, 31 May 1971
- Clark Air Base, Philippines, 15 November 1973
- Yokota Air Base, Japan, 1 October 1989 – present

=== Aircraft ===
The 374th AW aircrews have flown a variety of aircraft, including the Douglas C-47 Skytrain, Curtiss-Wright C-46 Commando, Douglas C-54 Skymaster, C-124 Globemaster II, Fairchild C-119 "Flying Boxcar", Lockheed C-130 Hercules, McDonnell Douglas C-9, C-12 Huron, C-21A, and Bell Helicopter Textron UH-1 Huey

== See also ==
- United States Army Air Forces in Australia
