= 21st Airlift Squadron =

Unit of the US Air Force, part of the 60th Operations Group

21st Airlift Squadron

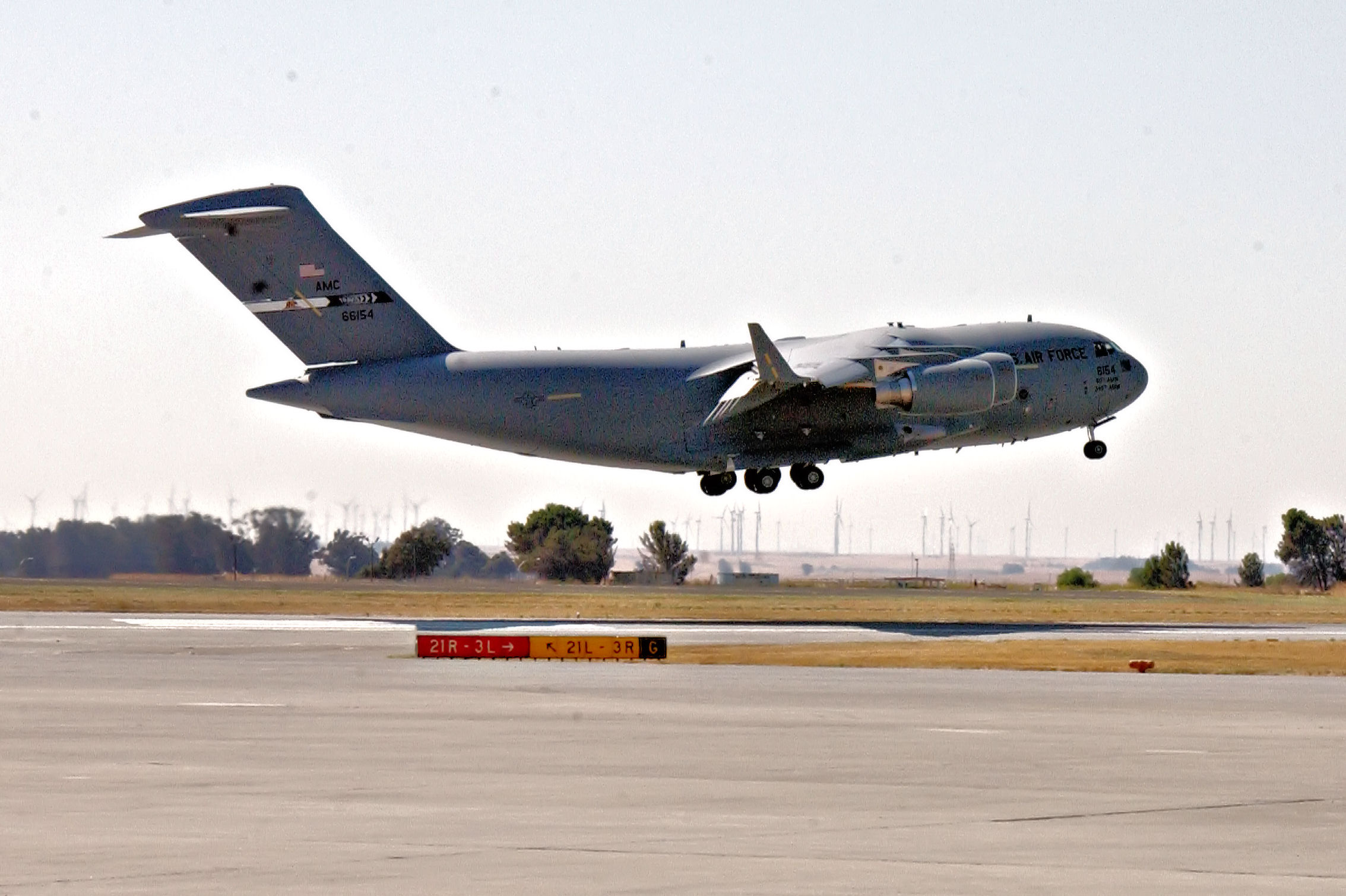
- 21st Airlift Squadron C-17A Globemaster III
- Active: 942–1946; 1946–present
- Country: United States
- Branch: United States Air Force
- Role: airlift
- Part of: Air Mobility Command
- Garrison/HQ: Travis Air Force Base, California
- Nickname: BEEliners
- Motto: Setting the Airlift Standard
- Colors: Red & Yellow / Black & Yellow (Friday)
- Mascot: Delta Bee
- Anniversaries: 3 April 1942
- Engagements: World War II (Asia-Pacific Theater) Korean War

- Decorations: Distinguished Unit Citation (7x); Presidential Unit Citation Air Force Outstanding Unit Award with Combat "V" Device Meritorious Unit Award Air Force Outstanding Unit Award (15x) Philippine Presidential Unit Citation (World War II) Republic of Korea Presidential Unit Citation Republic of Vietnam Gallantry Cross with Palm

Commanders
- Notable commanders: Charles R. Holland

Insignia
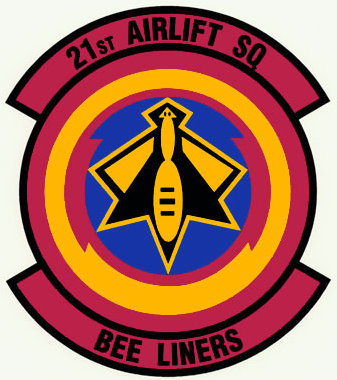
- 21st Airlift Squadron emblem (Note: Approved 9 December 1994.)

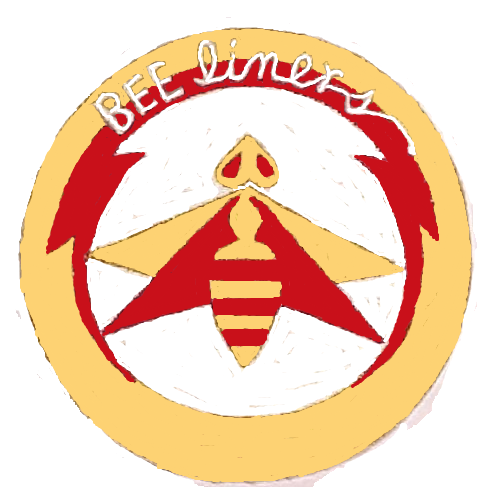
- 21st Troop Carrier Squadron emblem (Note: Approved 31 July 1959. Description: On a white disc bordered light golden brown, a stylized delta-winged bee, his head, body and upper wings light golden brown, eyes lower wings and stries on body, red, encircling the upper porton of the disc and surrounduin the border a stylized stinger wreath, red.)

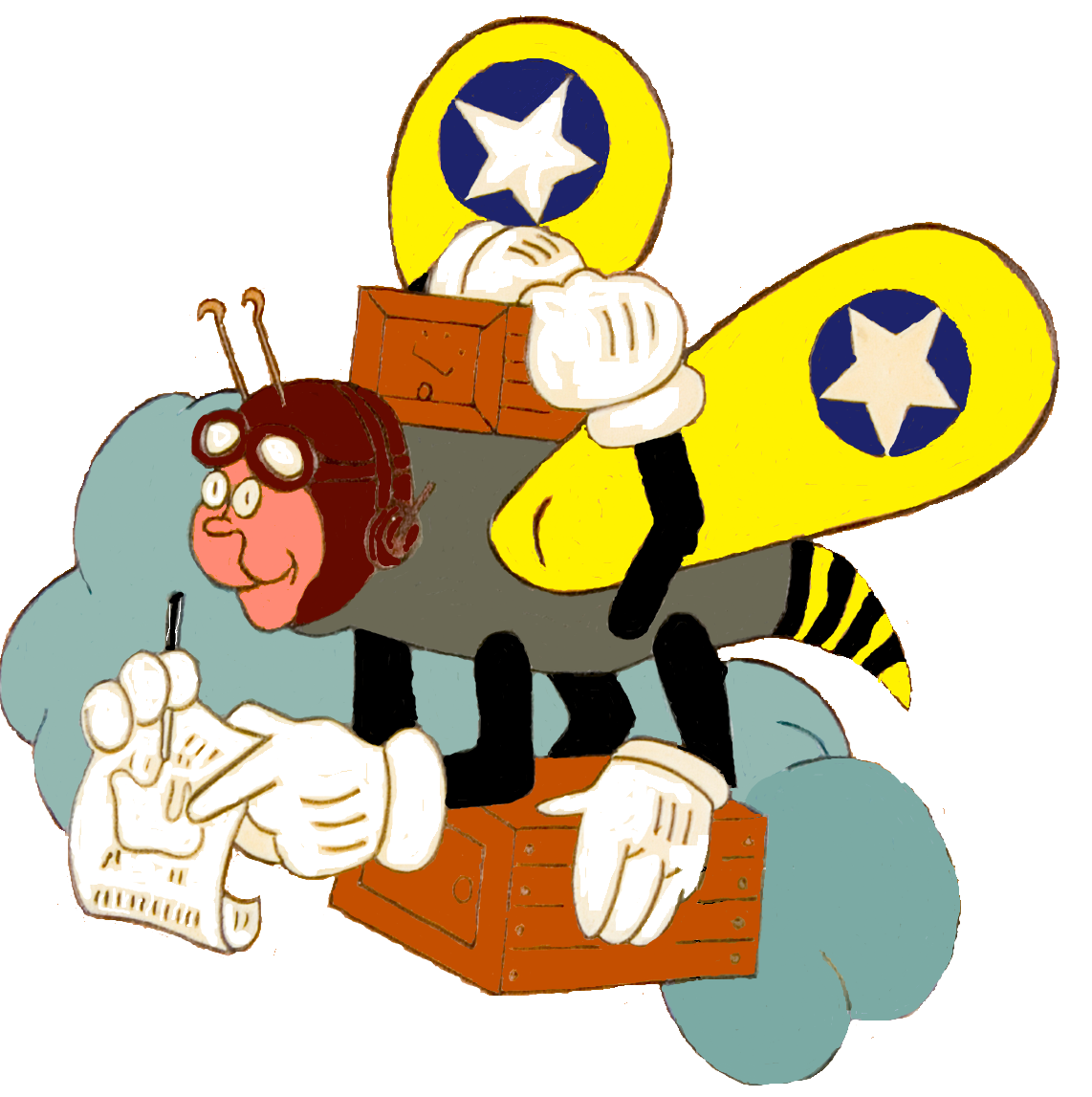
- 21st Troop Carrier Squadron emblem (Note: Approved 30 October 1942.)

Aircraft flown
- Transport: C-17 Globemaster III

The 21st Airlift Squadron is part of the 60th Air Mobility Wing at Travis Air Force Base, California. It operates C-17 Globemaster III aircraft carrying out United States Air Force global transport missions, duties which involve airlift and airdrop missions as well as provision of services and support in order to promote quality of life for both soldiers and civilians in situations requiring humanitarian aid.

First formed as the 21st Transport Squadron at Archerfield Airport, Australia on 3 April 1942. Activated in the wake of the United States withdrawal from the Philippines, the squadron was formed with a mixture of personnel withdrawn from Clark Field and some reinforcements which had arrived in Australia but did not see combat in the Philippines. The squadron was hastily put together with some impressed civilian Douglas DC-2s and DC-3s.

== History ==
=== World War II ===
The squadron's origins date to the activation of the 21st Transport Squadron at Archerfield Airport, Australia on 3 April 1942. Activated in the wake of the United States withdrawal from the Philippines, the squadron was formed with a mixture of personnel withdrawn from Clark Field and some reinforcements which had arrived in Australia but did not see combat in the Philippines. The squadron was hastily put together with some impressed civilian Douglas DC-2s and DC-3s with a mission of transporting personnel, equipment and supplies within Australia, organizing American and Australian forces against the perceived Japanese invasion of Australia.

Over the next few months the squadron was assigned additional aircraft, flying derivatives of the Lockheed C-56 and C-60 Lodestar along with a war-weary four-engine Boeing B-17D Flying Fortress withdrawn from the Philippines and a Douglas B-18 Bolo which had found its way to the South Pacific. The squadron entered combat on 5 July 1942, being redesignated the 21st Troop Carrier Squadron. It participated in paratroop drops at Nadzab, New Guinea, in September 1942. It continued to fly combat resupply and casualty evacuation missions from Brisbane.

In November 1942 the squadron was assigned to the 374th Troop Carrier Group. The 374th was a newly arrived group from the United States and arrived with new Douglas C-47 Skytrains. The mixture of aircraft the squadron was formed with were reassigned to other units. With the 374th the squadron continued to fly combat missions over New Guinea.

The squadron moved to Nadzab Airfield, New Guinea in August 1944 to support the Allied effort to push Japanese forces off the island. The fierce fighting in tropical and mountainous New Guinea continued until 1945. It proved to be one of the most important and difficult campaigns in the Pacific War. The squadron moved to Mokmer Airfield, on Biak, Papua New Guinea in October 1944, and remained there until the end of the war, as American forces continued to engage the Japanese in Southwest Asia until the end of the war in August 1945.

=== Postwar Service ===
With the end of the war, the 21st remained in the Pacific and assigned to the 374th. Curtiss C-46 Commandos were assigned to the squadron along with the C-47s that it had used during wartime. The squadron was first moved to Occupied Japan, where it conducted airlift missions in support of Fifth Air Force and MacArthur's headquarters from Atsugi Airfield, near Tokyo. It returned to 374th Group Headquarters at Nielson Field, near Manila in the Philippines by the end of the year. At Nielson Field, the squadron was inactivated, its personnel returning to the United States for demobilization back to civilian life.

The 374th Group moved to Harmon Field on Guam in late 1946 where the 21st and the other squadrons of the group supported the Guam Air Depot. The 21st flew needed supplies and equipment within the Southwest Pacific area to widely scattered airfields in the Philippines, Okinawa and the bases in the Mariana Islands. Long-range 4-engine Douglas C-54 Skymasters were assigned to the squadron in 1946, replacing its C-46s. In 1949, the squadron was attached to Twentieth Air Force headquarters on Guam moved to Clark Air Base in the Philippines in January 1950.

=== Cold War ===
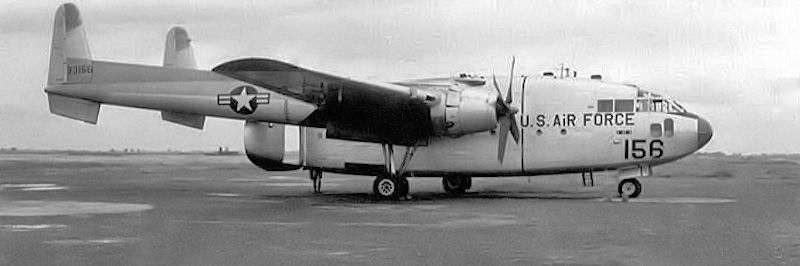
Fairchild C-119G Flying Boxcar, 53-3156. This airframe was later converted to an AC-119K Stinger gunship.

When the Korean War began in 1950, the 21st was again called into action. The squadron moved to Tachikawa Air Base, Japan, where it exchanged its long-range C-54s for twin-engined C-46 and C-47 aircraft. The squadron carried much needed equipment and supplies, along with personnel across the Sea of Japan to marginal dirt airstrips in South Korea on an almost continuous basis. The squadron participated in all major engagements in Korea, including the massive airdrops at Sunchon in which 290.8 tons of supplies and 1,093 paratroopers were dropped in three days. The squadron operated from various airfields in Japan, flying combat resupply and evacuation missions back to Japan until December 1952 when the 21st was relieved of combat duty, and re-equipped with C-54 Skymasters.

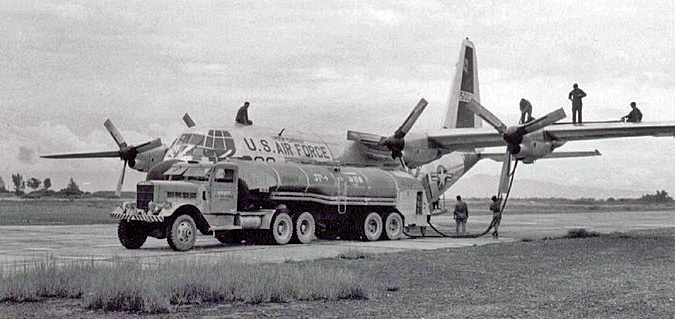
C-130A Hercules being refueled at Chiayi Air Base, Taiwan

From its base at Tachikawa, the squadron began flying airlift missions in the southwest Pacific and to Alaska. In addition, the squadron began flying trans-pacific missions to Hawaii, along with flights to Military Air Transport Service bases at McChord Air Force Base, Washington and Travis Air Force Base, California. It transported combat wounded and other personnel back to the United States, and personnel, equipment and supplies from the US to Japan. In late 1955, the 21st was moved to Kisarazu Air Base to relieve overcrowding at Tachikawa.

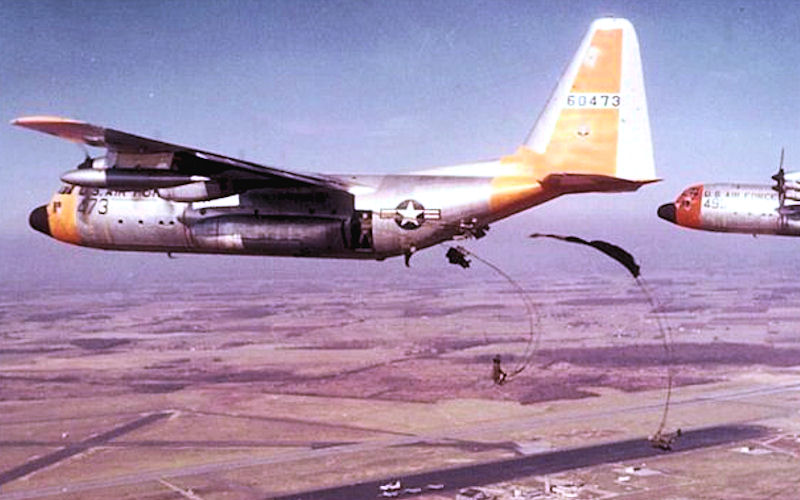
Lockheed C-130A-6-LM Hercules, 56-473, performing a parachute drop, with 56-493 in the distance.

In late 1956, the squadron moved to Naha Air Base, Okinawa, where it was re-equipped with Fairchild C-119 Flying Boxcars. With these tactical transports, it began flying missions to Taiwan and also to South Vietnam carrying personnel, equipment and supplies. In 1958, the squadron began to receive new Lockheed C-130A Hercules to replace the C-119s. For the better part of the next 40 years, the 21st would fly increasingly updated versions of the Hercules in Southeast Asia.

Based in Okinawa, the squadron used its cargo and personnel hub at Naha AB to transship personnel and cargo to bases on Taiwan, the Philippines and increasingly to support United States forces that were building up in South Vietnam, Thailand and Laos. As the level of American involvement increased in the ongoing conflict in Southeast Asia, the C-130s of the squadron were becoming a more common sight during the 1960s in support of operations.

In 1967, the squadron was redesignated the 21st Tactical Airlift Squadron. In 1968, during the siege of Khe Sanh, crews from the 21st performed massive combat airdrops and assault landing supporting the besieged outpost. In 1971 Naha Air Base was closed and the squadron moved to Ching Chuan Kang Air Base on Taiwan, however the political sensitivity of having a permanently assigned USAF unit on Taiwan led the squadron to move to Clark Air Base in the Philippines in November 1973. Through 1973 and 1974, the "Bee liners" were instrumental in repatriating American POWs to US soil.

During the 1980s, the 21st frequently participated in exercises including Team Spirit, Foal Eagle, Tandem Orbit, and Cope Thunder. In 1989 due to the decision to downsize Clark Air Base, the squadron again moved to Yokota Air Base, Japan, which was being developed as a Military Airlift Command passenger/cargo hub. The 21st was selected for the 1991 Military Airlift Command's Outstanding Tactical Airlift Unit Award and best Active Duty Tactical Airdrop Award at the 1993 Rodeo competition.

=== Return to the United States ===
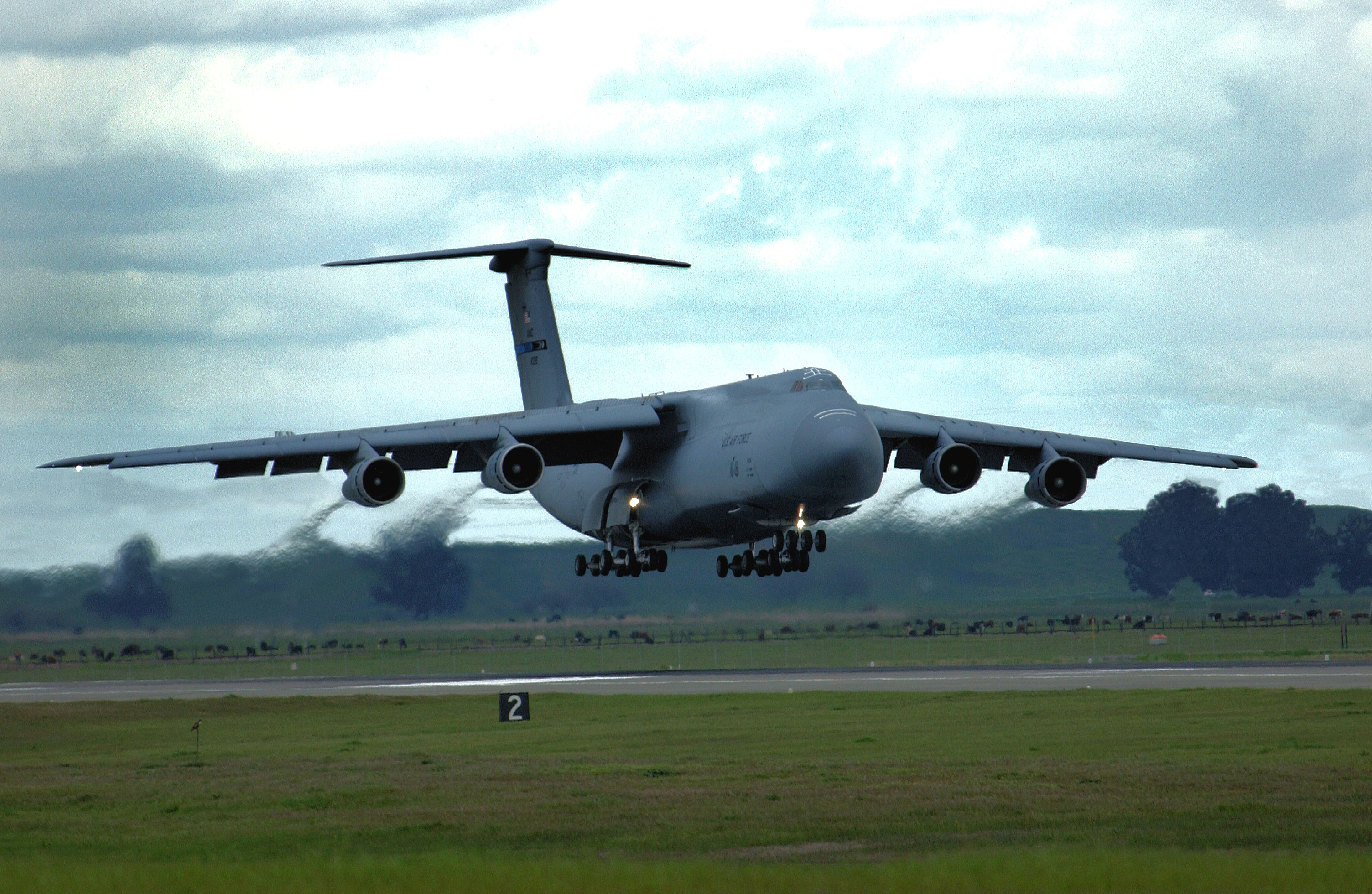
21st Airlift Squadron Lockheed C-5B Galaxy, 87-0037, returns from a training flight 31 March 2006. The event marked the final C-5 flight for the 21st Airlift Squadron.

As part of a worldwide realignment of Air Mobility Command assets on 1 October 1993, the 21st transferred its C-130s at Yokota to the 36th Airlift Squadron, which retired its Lockheed C-141 Starlifters at McChord Air Force Base, Washington and moved to Yokota as a paper unit. The 21st, in turn, was transferred to Travis Air Force Base, California where it took over the assets of the Lockheed C-5 Galaxy 75th Airlift Squadron. The 75th was transferred in turn to Ramstein Air Base, Germany where it took over the Douglas C-9 Nightingale medical Evacuation mission of USAFE. This realignment was due to the large reduction in USAF assets after the end of the Cold War and the directive by USAF Chief of Staff General Merrill McPeak to retain notable units on active duty as much as possible.

Since the conversion to the C-5 Galaxy in 1993, the 21st helped avert conflict between North and South Korea by flying triple aerial-refueling mission carrying Patriot missile batteries directly to South Korea.

They were also involved in several humanitarian missions in 1994 including transportation of tons of badly needed medical supplies and food to disease-ravaged Rwanda, missions in support of the Haitian and Cuban relief efforts, and closer to home, the 21st provided the first C-5 crew to fly critically needed firefighters equipment to earthquake-stricken Los Angeles. With the combination of the C-5 and aerial-refueling, the 21st delivered heavy and outsized cargo from the cold of Russia to the heat of Indonesia.

On 3 April 2006, the 21st Airlift Squadron celebrated its 64th anniversary. On the same day, the squadron transferred from the C-5 Galaxy to the Boeing C-17A Globemaster III. On 8 August 2006, the 21st received its first C-17, "The Spirit of Solano". With the arrival of the C-17, the C-5 Galaxies were transferred to the 439th Airlift Wing at Westover Air Reserve Base, Massachusetts.

== Lineage ==
- Constituted as the 21st Transport Squadron on 7 March 1942

Activated on 3 April 1942
Redesignated 21st Troop Carrier Squadron on 5 July 1942
Inactivated on 31 January 1946

- Activated on 15 October 1946

Redesignated 21st Troop Carrier Squadron, Heavy on 21 May 1948
Redesignated 21st Troop Carrier Squadron, Medium on 2 February 1951
Redesignated 21st Troop Carrier Squadron, Heavy on 1 December 1952
Redesignated 21st Troop Carrier Squadron, Medium on 18 September 1956
Redesignated 21st Troop Carrier Squadron on 8 December 1966
Redesignated 21st Tactical Airlift Squadron on 1 August 1967
Redesignated 21st Airlift Squadron on 1 April 1992

=== Assignments ===
- Air Transport Command, US Army Forces in Australia (later Air Carrier Service, Air Service Command, Fifth Air Force), 3 April 1942
- 374th Troop Carrier Group, 12 November 1942 – 31 January 1946 (attached to 54th Troop Carrier Wing, 2 July–c. 1 September 1944)
- 374th Troop Carrier Group, 15 October 1946 (attached to Guam Air Materiel Area, Provisional, 1 February – 31 Aug 1947, Twentieth Air Force, 5 March 1949; 19th Bombardment Wing, 16 May 1949; Thirteenth Air Force, 1 February 1950; 18th Fighter-Bomber Wing, 17 February – 8 Jun 1950; Far East Air Forces Combat Cargo Command, Provisional, 16 October 1950 – 25 January 1951; 374th Troop Carrier Wing, 29 June 1951; 6122d Air Base Wing, 28 March 1952; 403d Troop Carrier Wing, 14 April–1 December 1952; 374th Troop Carrier Wing after 3 February 1956)

- 483d Troop Carrier Group, 18 September 1956 (remained attached to 374th Troop Carrier Wing; 483d Troop Carrier Wing after 1 July 1957)
- 483d Troop Carrier Wing, 8 December 1958
- 315th Air Division, 25 June 1960 (attached to Detachment 1, Hq, 315 Air Division; 6315th Operations Group after 20 October 1964)
- 374th Troop Carrier Wing (later 374th Tactical Airlift Wing), 8 August 1966
- 374th Operations Group, 1 April 1992
- 60th Operations Group, 1 October 1993 – present

=== Stations ===
- Archerfield Airport, Brisbane, Australia, 3 April 1942
- Port Moresby Airfield Complex, New Guinea, 18 February 1943
- Archerfield Airport, Brisbane, Australia, 28 September 1943
- Nadzab Airfield, New Guinea, 26 August 1944
- Mokmer Airfield, Biak, Papua New Guinea, 14 October 1944
- Atsugi Airfield, Japan, 20 September 1945
- Nielson Field, Manila, Philippines, December 1945 – 31 January 1946
- Harmon Field (later Harmon Air Force Base), Guam, 15 October 1946
- Clark Air Base, Philippines, 27 January 1950
- Tachikawa Air Base, Japan, 29 June 1950
- Ashiya Air Base, Japan, 21 July 1950
- Brady Air Base, Japan, 3 September 1950
- Itazuke Air Base, Japan, 24 October 1950

- Tachikawa Air Base, Japan, 25 January 1951
- Ashiya Air Base, Japan, 26 July 1951
- Tachikawa Air Base, Japan, 18 October 1951
- Ashiya Air Base, Japan, 28 March 1952
- Tachikawa Air Base, Japan, 1 December 1952

Deployed at Kisarazu Air Base, Japan, 14–20 November 1955
Advanced party at Naha Air Base, Okinawa, 18 August–14 November 1958

- Naha Air Base, Okinawa, 15 November 1958
- Ching Chuan Kang Air Base, Taiwan, 31 May 1971
- Clark Air Base, Philippines, 1 November 1973
- Yokota Air Base, Japan, 1 October 1989 – 1 October 1993
- Travis Air Force Base, California, 1 October 1993 – present

=== Aircraft ===
- Douglas DC-2, 1942
- Douglas DC-3, 1942
- Douglas C-39, 1942
- Lockheed C-40 Electra, 1942
- Douglas C-49, 1942
- Douglas C-50, 1942
- Douglas C-53 Skytrooper, 1942
- Lockheed C-56 Lodestar, 1942
- Lockheed C-60 Lodestar, 1942
- Boeing B-17D Flying Fortress, 1942
- Douglas B-18 Bolo, 1942
- Consolidated LB-30 Liberator, 1942
- Douglas C-47 Skytrain, 1942–1946, 1950–1952
- Curtiss C-46 Commando, 1945–1946; 1946–1949, 1950, 1952
- Douglas C-54 Skymaster, 1946–1950, 1952–1956
- Fairchild C-119 Flying Boxcar, 1956–1959
- Lockheed C-130 Hercules, 1958–1971, 1971–1993
- Lockheed C-5 Galaxy, 1993–2006
- Boeing C-17 Globemaster III, 2006–present
