= Ching Chuan Kang Air Base =

Republic of China Air Force (ROCAF) base in Taichung, Taiwan

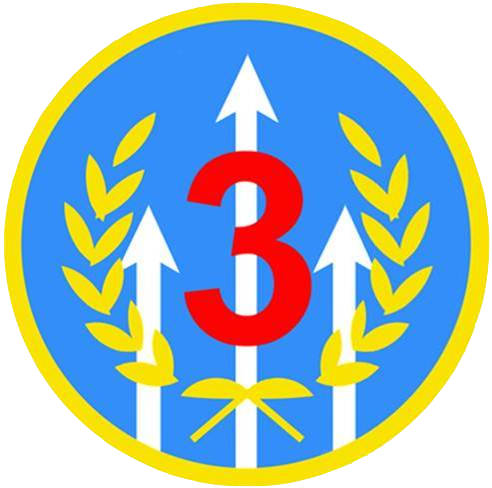
Ching Chuan Kang Air Base
- 清泉崗空軍基地
- Part of Republic of China Air Force
- Taichung, Taiwan
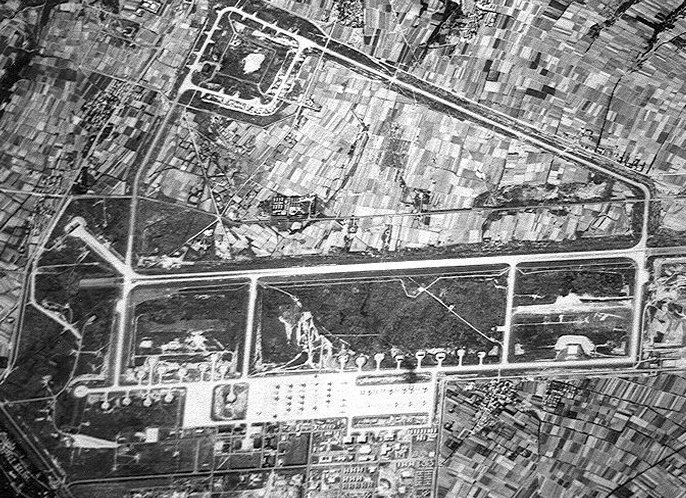
- Aerial image of CCK Air Base

Site information
- Type: Air Base
- Controlled by: ROC Air Force; ROC Army; United States Air Force(1957-1979)

Location
- Location of Ching Chuan Kang Air Base in the Taiwan
- Coordinates: 24.26°N 120.62°E

Site history
- Built: 1954
- Built by: Taiwan; United States
- In use: 1957–present
- Battles/wars: Vietnam War

Airfield information
- Identifiers: IATA: RMQ, ICAO: RCMQ
- Elevation: 203m (663ft) AMSL
Runways
Direction	Length and surface
18/36	3,659 metres (12,005 ft) Concrete

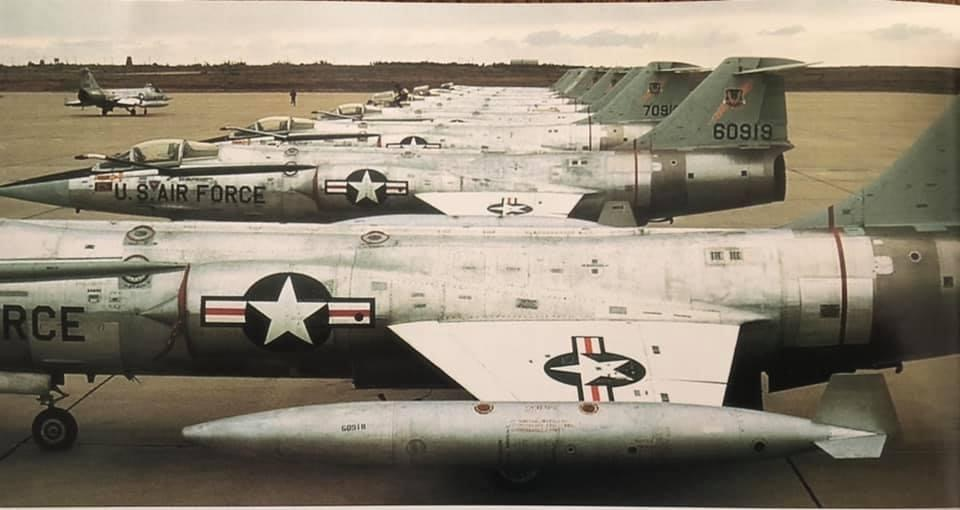
U.S. Air Force Lockheed F-104C Starfighters from the 434th Tactical Fighter Squadron, 479th Tactical Fighter Wing, at Ching Chuan Kang Air Base, Taiwan, in April 1965.

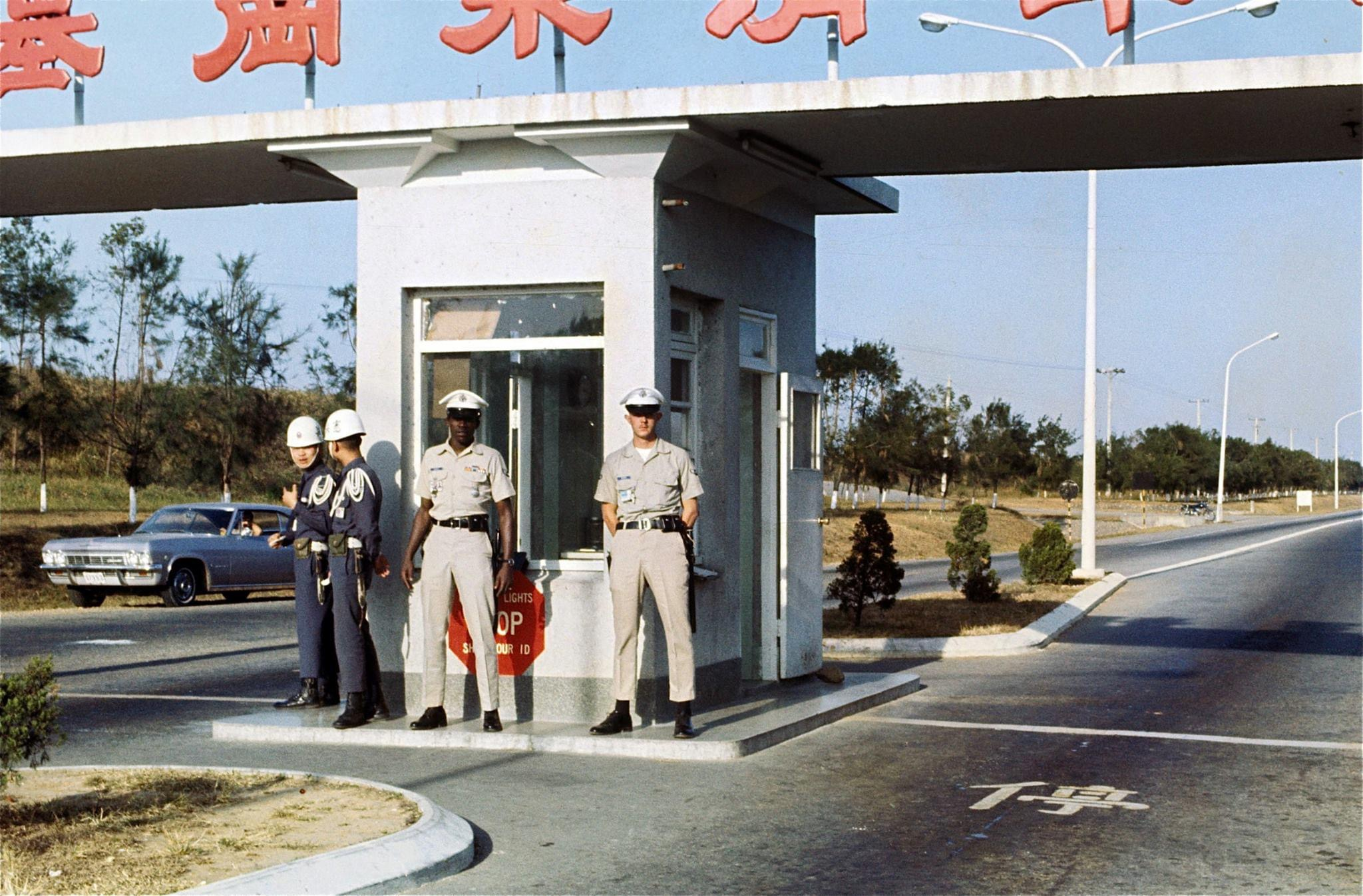
CCK AB, Taiwan, Main Gate, a joint guard post of the U.S. Air Force Security Police and the ROC Air Force Military Police, 1969

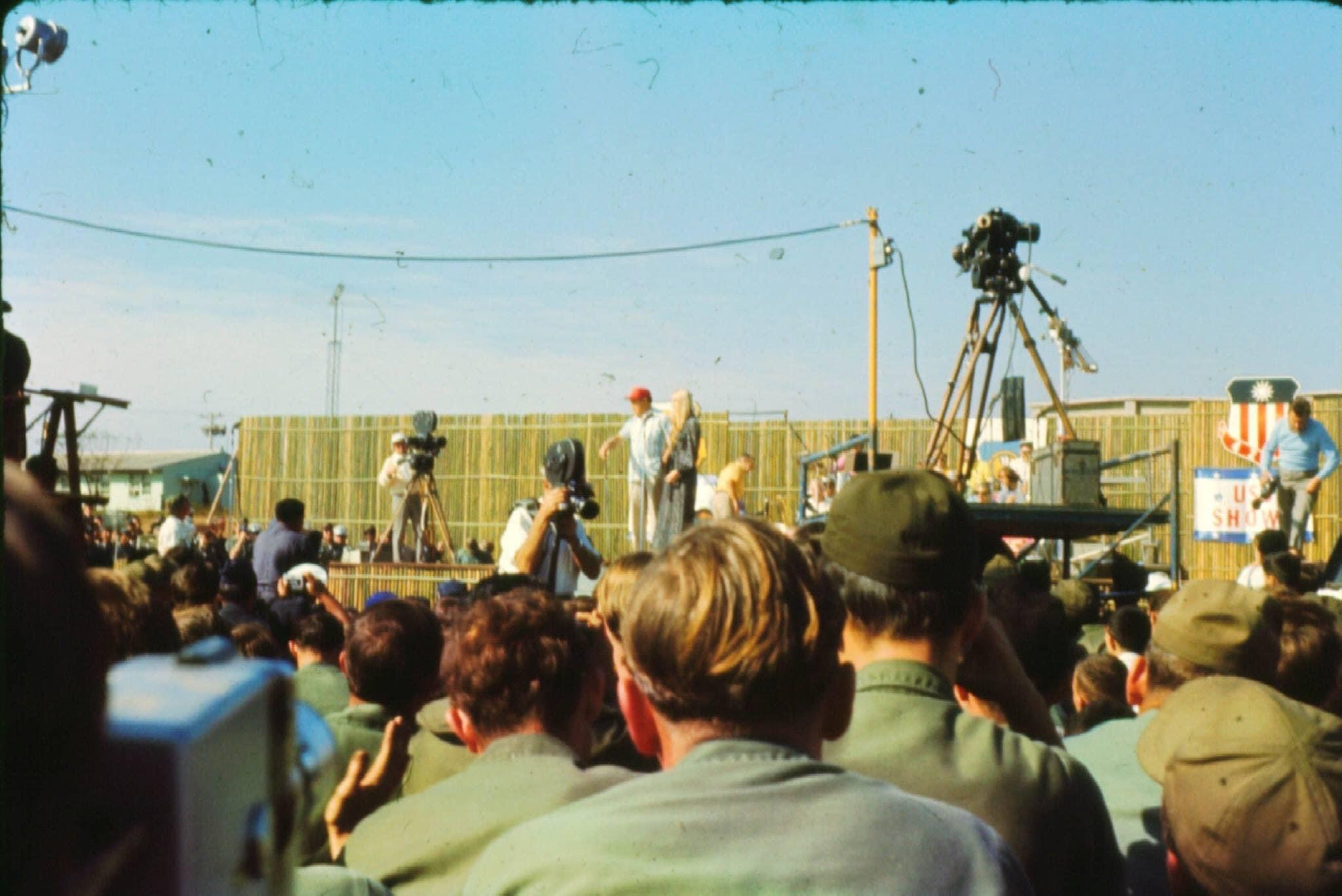
Bob Hope Christmas Show at CCK Air Base, Taiwan on 29 December 1969

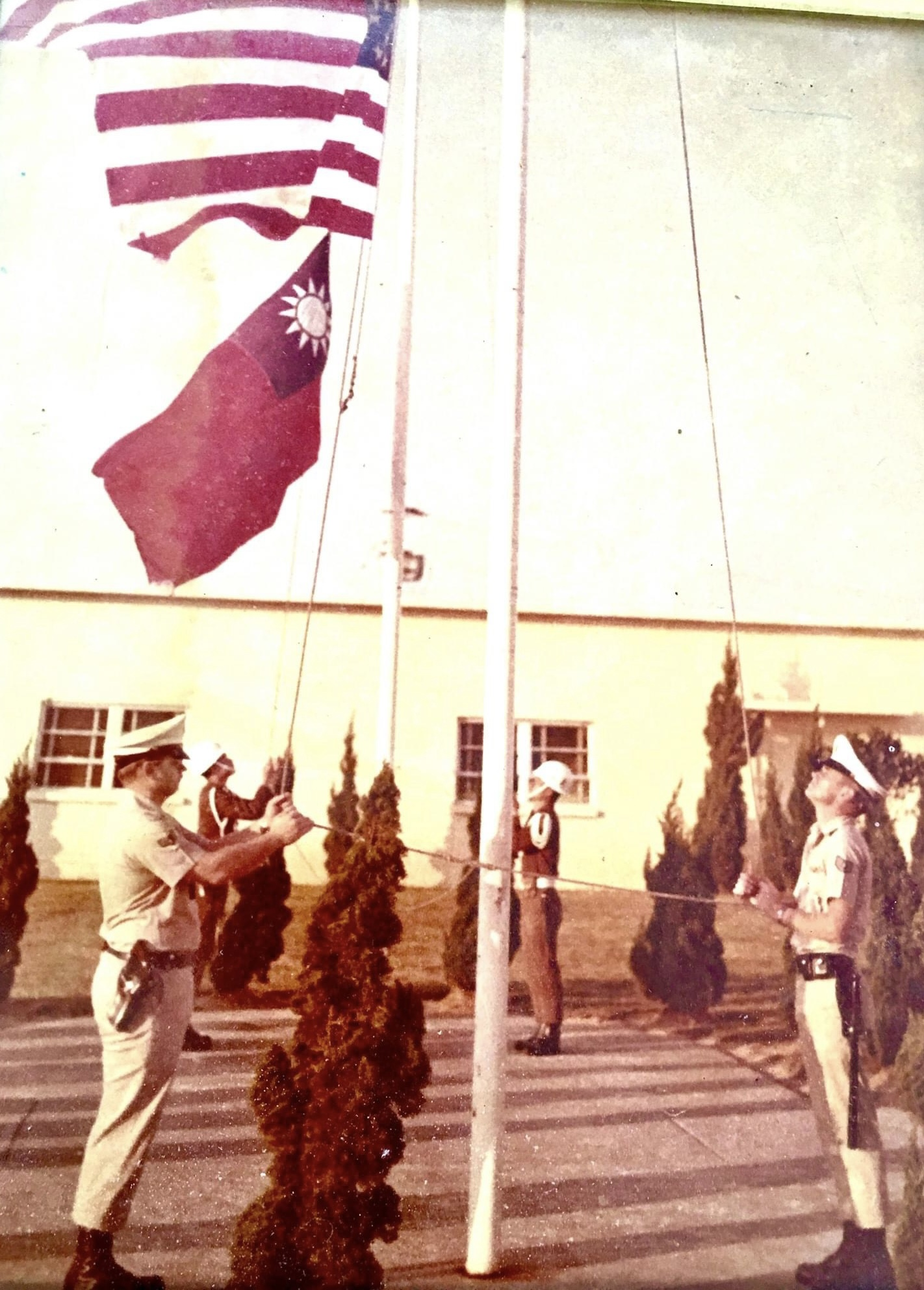
CCK Air Base, Taiwan, Flag Raising of the U.S. Air Force Security Police and the ROC Air Force Military Police, 1973

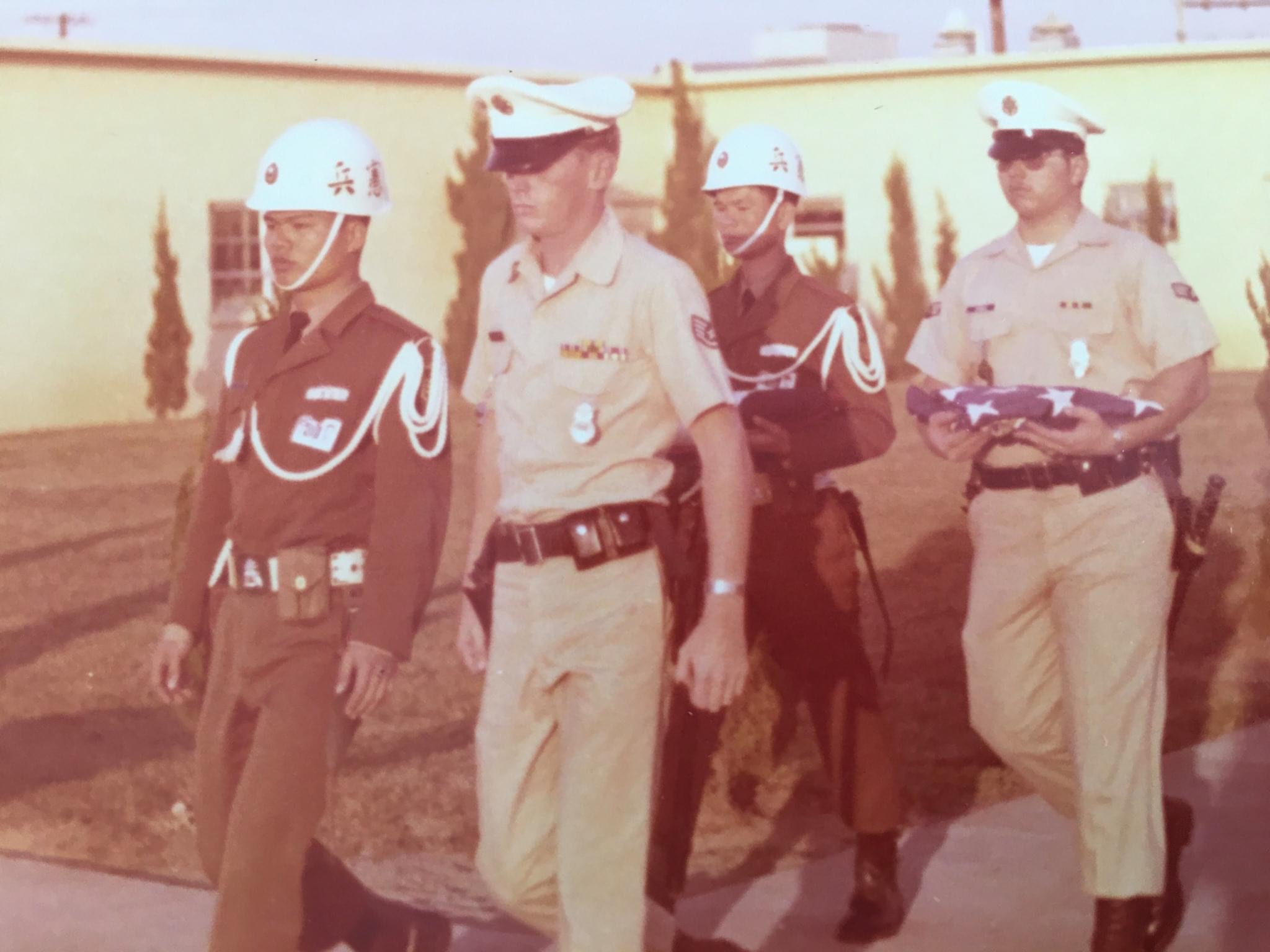
CCK Air Base, Taiwan, Flag Raising of the U.S. Air Force Security Police and the ROC Air Force Military Police, 1973

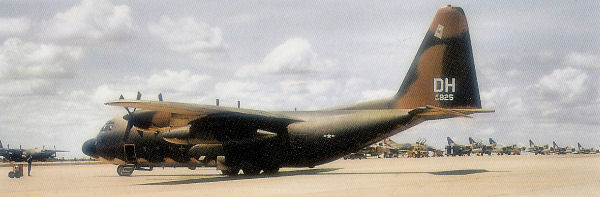
Lockheed C-130E-LM Hercules 63-7825 345th TAS/374th TAW

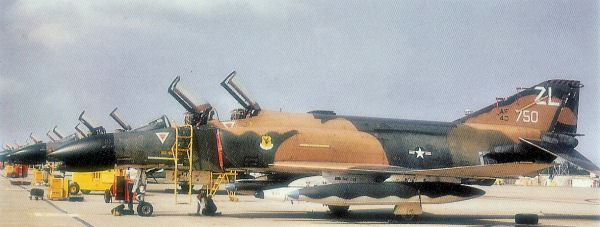
McDonnell F-4C-23-MC Phantoms of the 44th TFS/18th TFW deployed at CCK, 2 October 1973

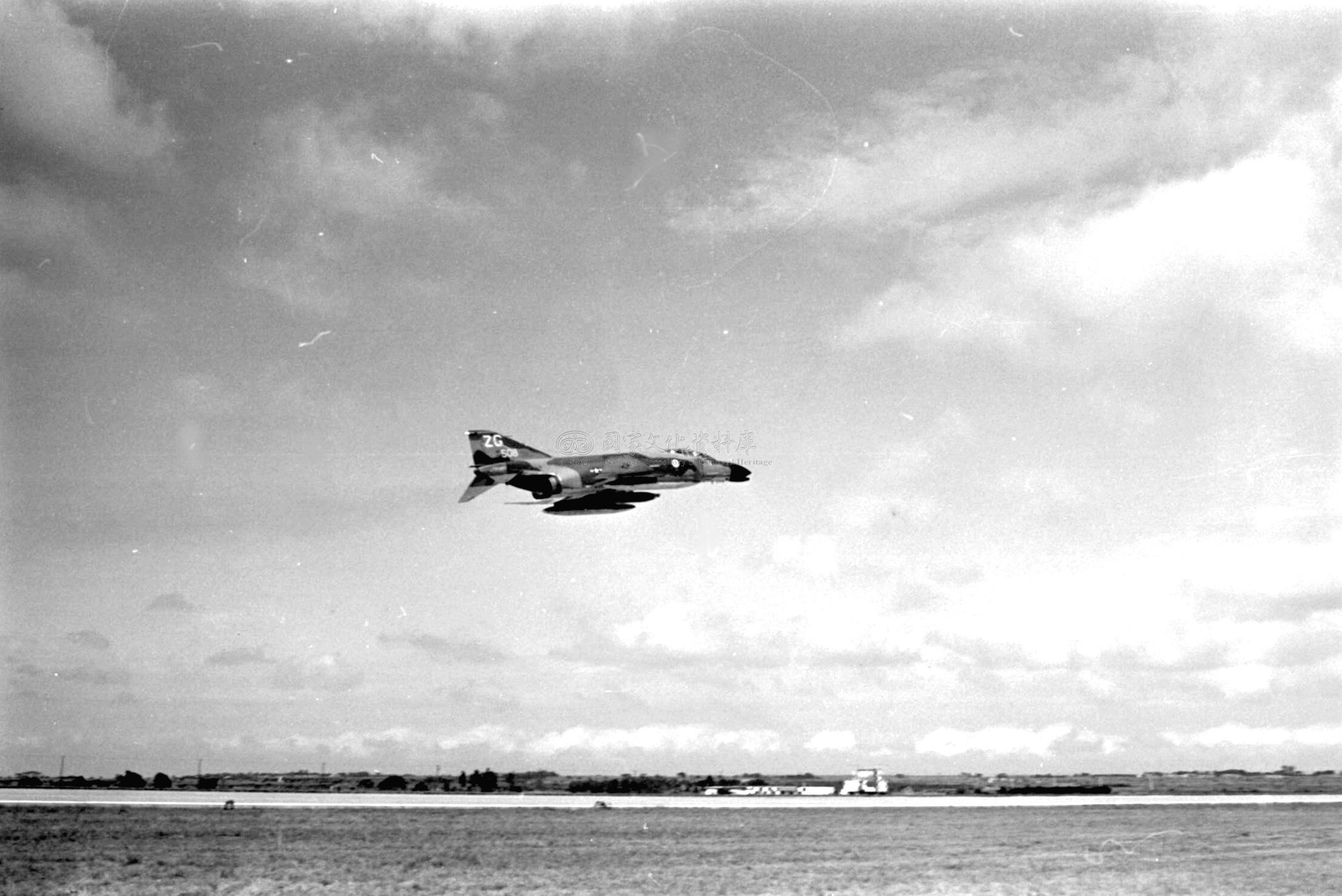
The EF-4C fighters of the 67th Tactical Fighter Squadron of the US Air Force took off from the CCK Air Base, Taiwan for Combat air patrol, 20 November 1972

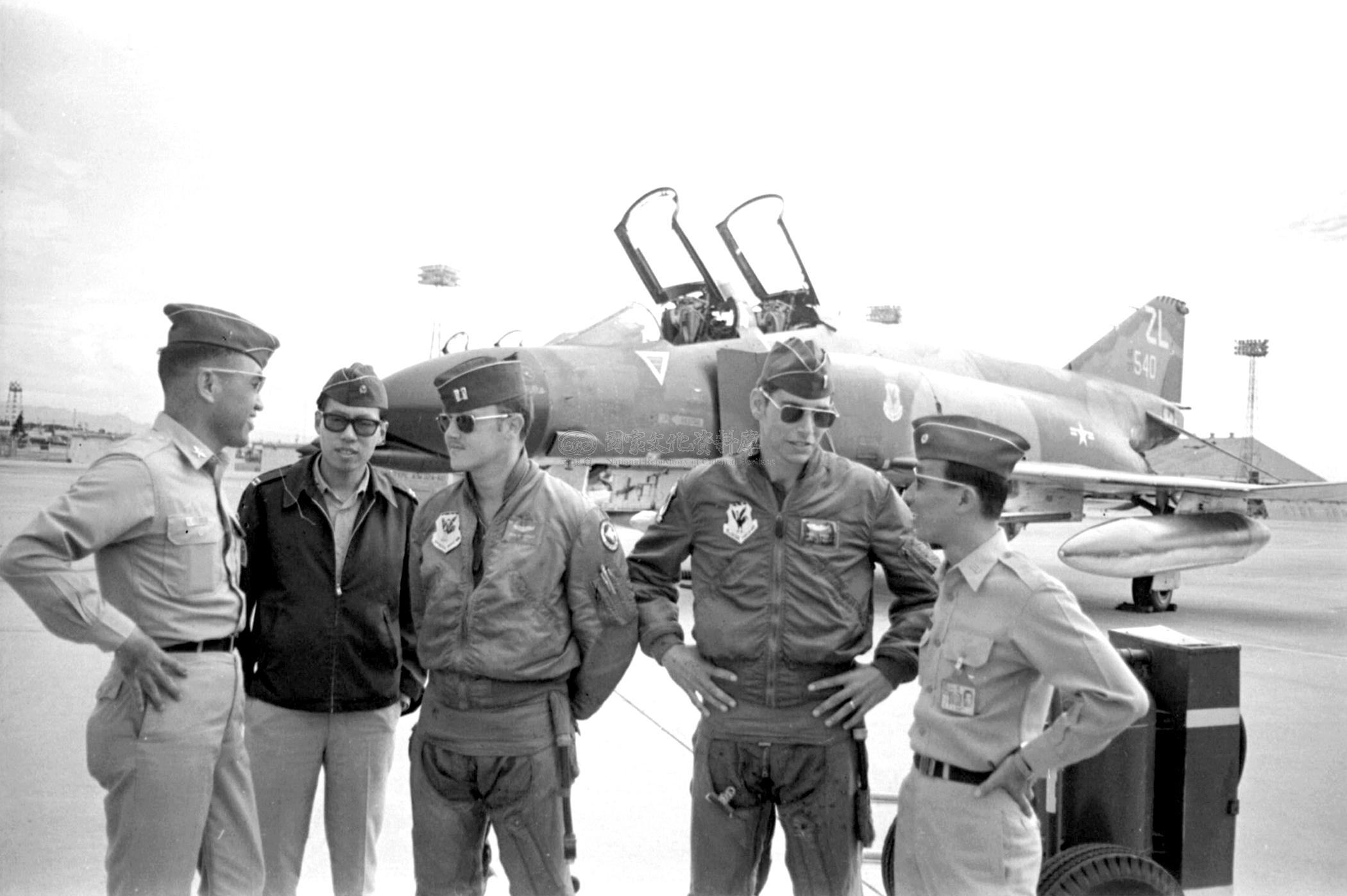
The 44th and 67th Tactical Fighter Squadron deployed to Ching Chuan Kang Air Base in Taiwan, F-4 fighter pilots and ROC Air Force pilots were interviewed by reporters, 20 November 1972

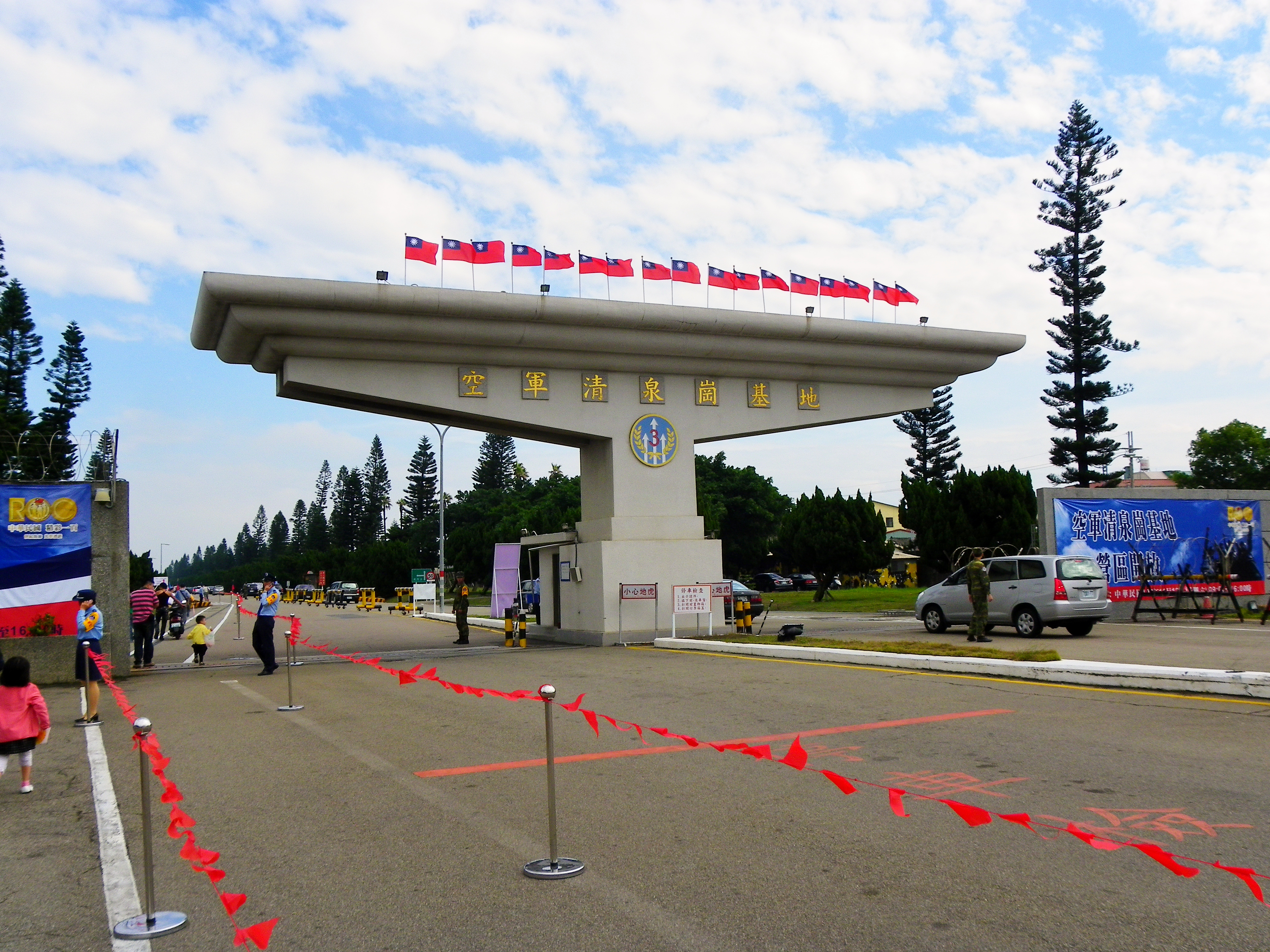
Main gate of Ching Chuan Kang Air Base

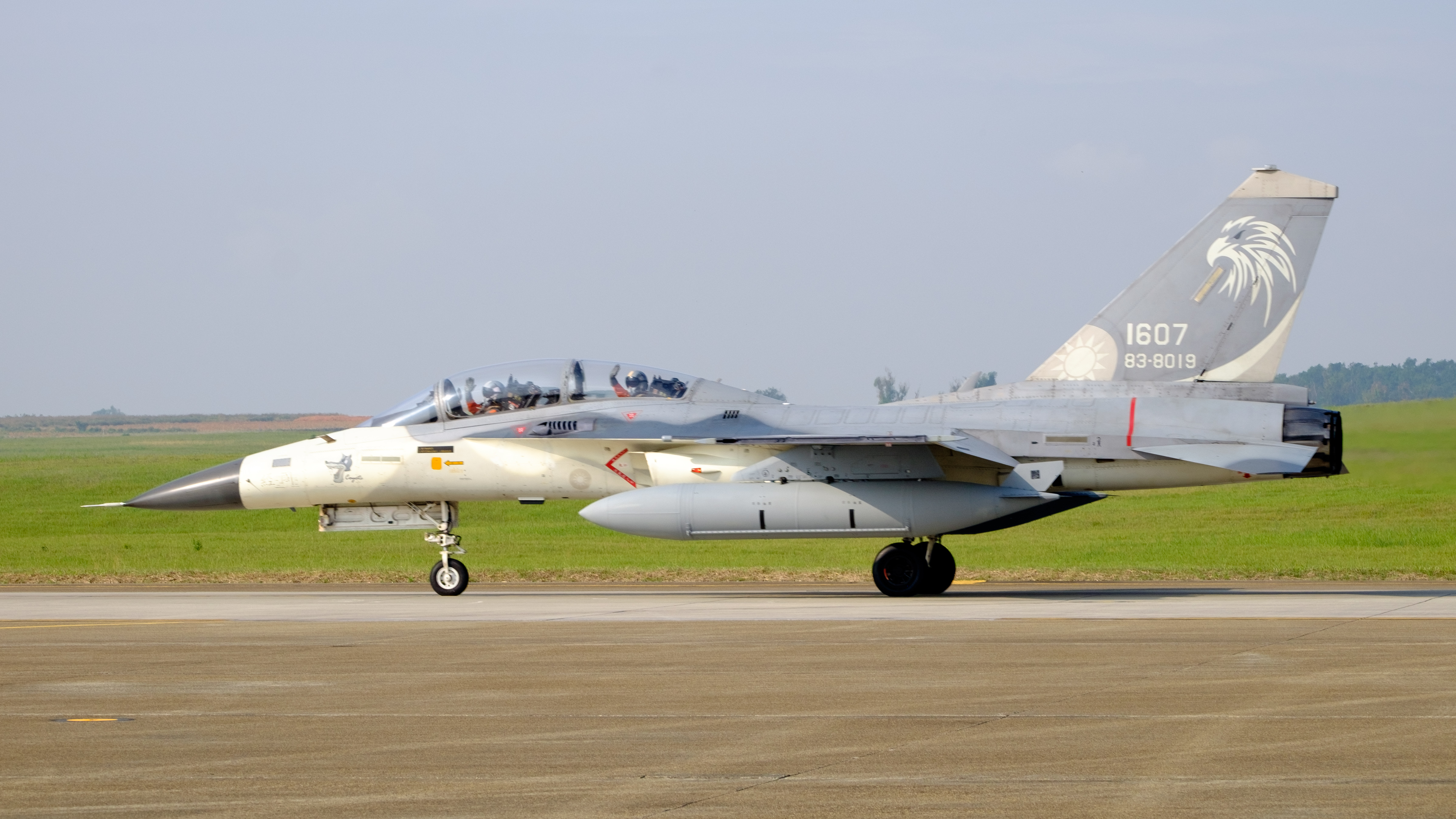
The F-CK-1 fighter of the ROC Air Force is located at Ching Chuan Kang Air base

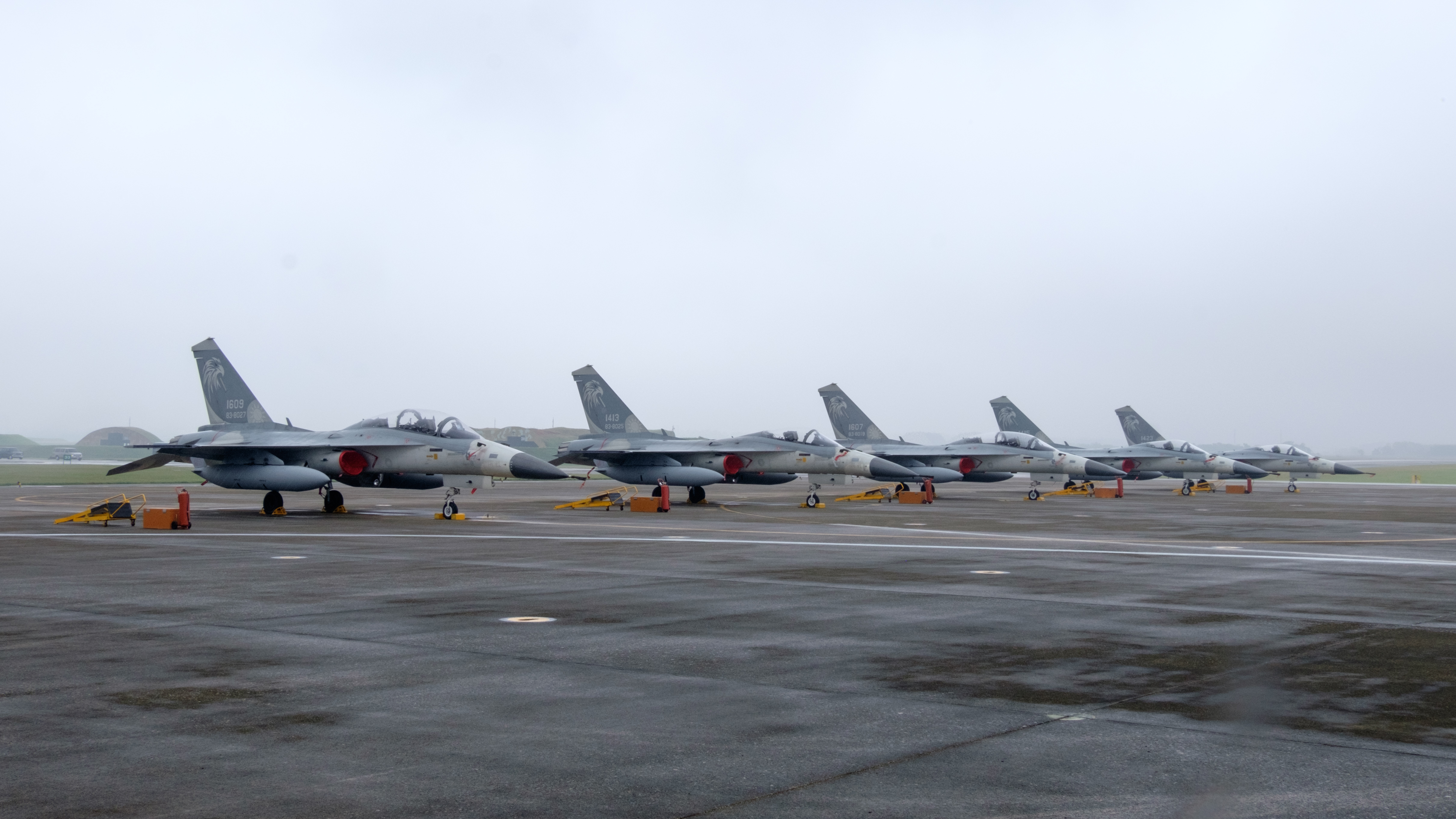
Five F-CK-1s of the 427th Wing at Ching Chuang Kang Air Base

Ching Chuan Kang Air Base (Chinese: 清泉崗空軍基地, CCK) is a Republic of China Air Force (ROCAF) base located in Taichung, Taiwan. It is the home to the 3rd Tactical Fighter Wing, with three squadrons of AIDC F-CK-1 Ching-kuo fighter aircraft. It is also used by the army's airborne and special operations command.

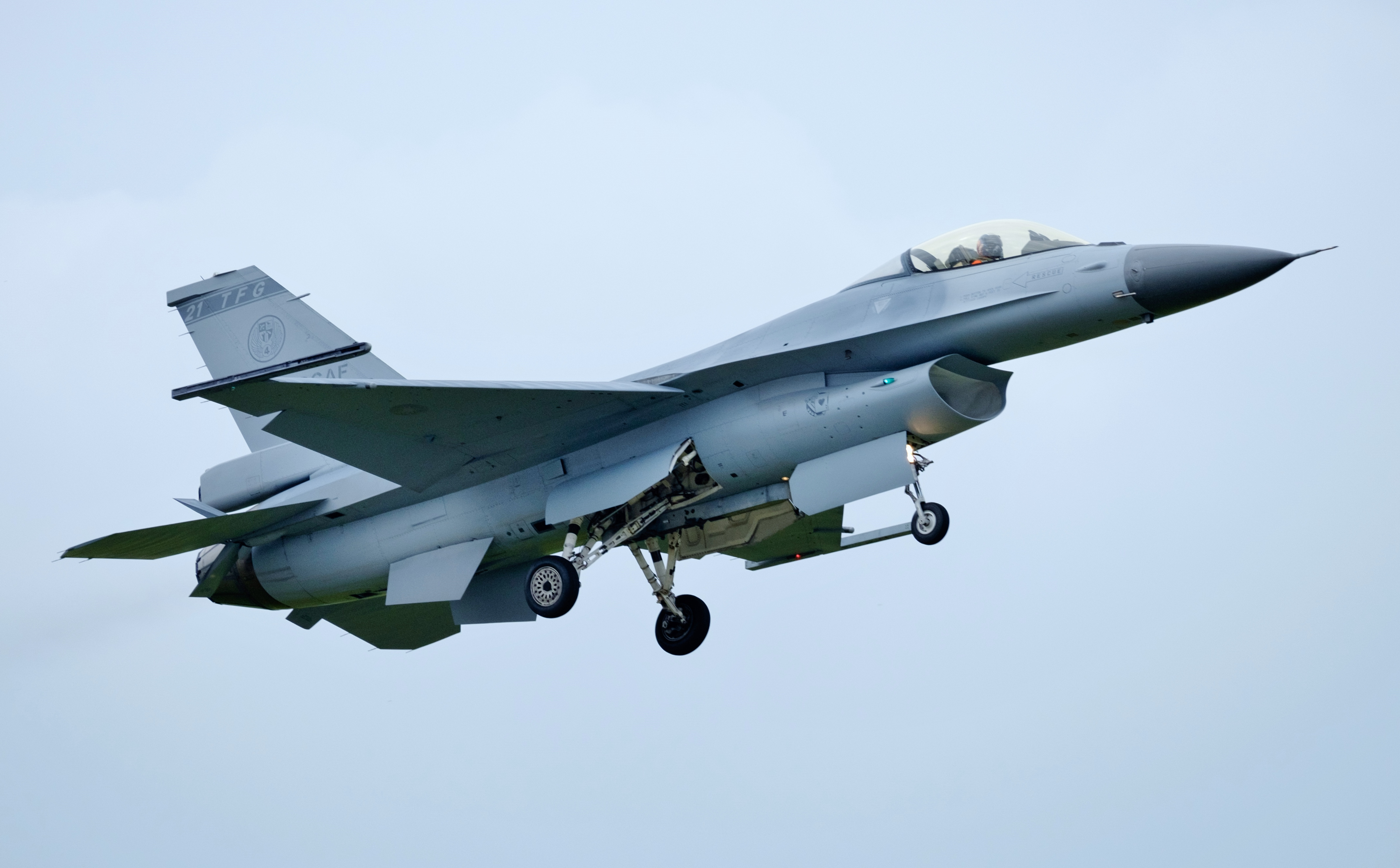
ROCAF F-16A Flight Demonstration in Ching Chuan Kang Air Force Base

Ching Chuan Kang Air Base is shared with Taichung International Airport (IATA: RMQ, ICAO: RCMQ).

== History ==
The forerunner to CCK Air Base was built in 1936, during Japanese rule, in the vicinity of Kōkan (公館), hence the former name Kōkan Airport. Construction of the airfield started in 1954, and was given the highest priority of several projects begun after the situation between Taiwan and Mainland China became tense in the mid-1950s. The air base was renamed Ching Chuan Kang Air Base on 20 March 1966 in memory of ROC Army Gen. Qiu Qingquan, and was thereafter known throughout the theater by its initials, CCK. As of the late 1990s, the longest runway at CCK was reportedly 12,000 feet (3,700 m) long.

Taiwan obtained an initial batch of American F-104 Starfighters in 1960–61, and eventually received over 200 of these aircraft, all of which were withdrawn from service in the early 1990s. The Starfighters were operated by the 2nd/499th Tactical Fighter Wing at Hsinchu, the 3rd/427th TFW at Ching Chuan Kang AB, and the 5th/401st Tactical Combined Wing at Taoyuan.

In May 1999 it was reported that China had built a replica of Ching Chuan Kang AB at a site near Dingxin airport (40.379°N 99.89°E) in the northwest province of Gansu, presumably to train units assigned to attack the Taiwanese facility in the event of conflict.

The base is also currently home to the AH-1W attack helicopters of the Army's 602nd Brigade.

== Based units ==
Republic of China Air Force

- 3rd Tactical Fighter Wing
  - War Research Evaluation Center
  - 7th Tactical Fighter Squadron – AIDC F-CK-1 Ching-kuo
  - 28th Tactical Fighter Squadron – AIDC F-CK-1 Ching-kuo
  - 3rd Maintenance and Supply Group
  - 3rd Base Service Group
  - 3rd Military Police Squadron
- Air Force Air Defense and Artillery Command
  - 795th Air defense missile brigade
    - 63rd Battalion – MIM-104 Patriot

== USAF use ==
During the Cold War, CCK was used by the United States Air Force as a support installation of United States Taiwan Defense Command. At the same time, it was also the largest air base of the US military stationed in Taiwan, with about 6,000-8,000 US troops stationed.

In 1954, the US Military Assistance Advisory Group, Taiwan (MAAG, Taiwan) was stationed at the base.

USAF use of the base began in 1958 with the deployment of twelve Lockheed F-104 Starfighters from the 83d Fighter-Interceptor Squadron during the Quemoy crisis. The crisis was peacefully resolved, and the aircraft were returned to the United States.

From August 1958 to January 1959, the 51st Fighter-Interceptor Wing deployed eight F-86Ds to Ching Chuan Kang Air Base Taiwan to fly combat air support missions for Republic of China Armed Forces.

In February 1960, after US Air Force a survey of bases on Taiwan it was decided that Kung Kuan AB would best suit the needs of USAF tactical units.

In 10 – 20 May 1960, the 67th Tactical Reconnaissance Wing aircraft were deployed to Kung Kuan AB (later Ching Chuan Kang).

From 20 May – 13 June 1960, the Tactical Air Command (TAC) deployed the 474th Tactical Fighter Wing, 428th Tactical Fighter Squadron from Nellis Air Force Base, Nevada, to Kung Kuan AB.

From 4–14 June 1960, the 18th Tactical Fighter Wing deployed aircraft from Kadena Air Base, Okinawa to Kung Kuan AB.

4-11 December 1960, the 405th Fighter Wing deployed F-102 Delta Dagger from Clark Air Base, Philippines to Kung Kuan AB.

14 – 28 March 1961, the 18th Tactical Fighter Wing deployed the 15th Tactical Reconnaissance Squadron from Kadena Air Base, Okinawa to Kung Kuan Air Base, Taiwan with McDonnell RF-101 Voodoo.

18 – 25 April 1961, 18th Tactical Fighter Wing deployed a detachment of 12th Tactical Fighter Squadron from Kadena Air Base, Okinawa to Kung Kuan Air Base with North American F-100 Super Sabre.

11 – 24 May 1961, the 39th Air Division based at Misawa Air Base, Japan deployed a task force of reconnaissance aircraft to Kung Kuan AB, Taiwan.

1 August – 30 September 1961, F-102 Delta Dagger of 509th Fighter-Interceptor Squadron were deployed from Clark AB to Kung Kuan AB in Operation BIG TRUCK.

6 – 12 March 1962, 18th Tactical Fighter Wing aircraft deployed to Kung Kuan AB. While there they participated in exercise FLYING TIGER, March 10 – 17, the 8th Tactical Fighter Wing was also deployed from Itazuke Air Base, Japan to Kung Kuan AB.

20-27 February 1963, The 510th Tactical Fighter Squadron was supported by Detachment 1, 6214th Air Base Group, Kung Kuan AB, during its deployment to Taiwan.

21 February 1963, 405th Fighter Wing deployed F-102 Delta Dagger to Kung Kuan AB for participation in SKY SOLDIER III.

13 March – 15 May 1963, The 67th Tactical Fighter Squadron was supported by Detachment 1, 6214th Air Base Group at Kung Kuan AB for its deployment to Taiwan with Republic F-105 Thunderchief.

17 – 27 March 1964, the 15th Tactical Reconnaissance Squadron was deployed from Kadena Air Base to Kung Kuan AB for reconnaissance missions, equipped with McDonnell RF-101 Voodoo.

In April 1965, the 479th Tactical Fighter Wing at George AFB California deployed two F-104C squadrons to CCK (434th and 435th TFS).

On 17 April 1965, General William H. Blanchard, Vice Chief of Staff, USAF, visited Ching Chuan Kang Air Base. He formally opened the new 1,000 man dining hall.

On 2 February 1966, 6217th Combat Support Group was established in CCK.

The following are the units that the 479th Tactical Fighter Wing once stationed at Ching Chuan Kang Air Base in Taiwan：

- 434th Tactical Fighter Squadron (April 1965 – October 1965) (F-104C)
- 435th Tactical Fighter Squadron (12 October 1965 – 21 December 1965) (F-104C)

Tactical Air Command reassigned the 314th Troop Carrier Wing, with Fairchild C-123 Providers and Lockheed C-130 Hercules to CCK on 22 January 1966 from Sewart AFB, Tennessee. Known squadrons were:

- 50th Tactical Airlift Squadron (C-130E) (February 1966 – May 1971) (Tail Code DE)
- 345th Tactical Airlift Squadron (C-130E) (February 1966 – May 1971) (Tail Code DH)
- 346th Tactical Airlift Squadron (C-130E) (March 1969 – May 1971) (Tail Code DY)
- 776th Tactical Airlift Squadron (C-130E) (February 1966 – May 1971) (Tail Code DL)

These aircraft remained deployed to the base to provide passenger and cargo airlift throughout the Far East and combat airlift in Southeast Asia. The 314th TAW returned to Little Rock AFB, Arkansas in 1971. The 314th was replaced by the Pacific Air Forces 374th Tactical Airlift Wing on 31 May 1971, being reassigned from Naha AB, Okinawa, with CCK becoming a major depot support facility in Asia for theater-based tactical airlift aircraft. Known squadrons were:

- 21st Tactical Airlift Squadron (C-130E) (May 1971 – November 1973) (Tail Code DY)
- 37th Tactical Airlift Squadron (C-130E) (December 1971 – March 1973)
- 50th Tactical Airlift Squadron (C-130E) (May 1971 – November 1973) (Tail Code DE)
- 345th Tactical Airlift Squadron (C-130E) (May 1971 – November 1973) (Tail Code DH)
- 776th Tactical Airlift Squadron (C-130E) (May 1971 – November 1973) (Tail Code DL)

The 374th remained heavily committed to support of operations in Southeast Asia, and also continued routine airlift in other areas. One of the wing's humanitarian missions-flood relief in the Philippines-earned it a Philippine Republic Presidential Unit Citation in 1972. The wing provided support in March 1973 for Operation Homecoming, the repatriation of American prisoners from Hanoi, North Vietnam.

The increase in the B-52 Arc Light sortie rates over Vietnam necessitated relocation of additional KC-135's which provided PACAF fighter support. In February 1968 the United States Air Force Strategic Air Command 4220th Air Refueling Squadron deployed to CCK, bringing KC-135 tankers formerly based at Takhli RTAFB, Thailand and Kadena AB Okinawa.

The KC-135s were redeployed to permit increased B-52 operations at U-Tapao and F-111 deployment at Takhli. The move of the KC-135's to Ching Chuan Kang increased their effectiveness since they would be based nearer to Vietnam refueling areas. In addition, five U-Tapao Royal Thai Navy Airfield based radio relay aircraft were moved to Ching Chuan Kang by February 1968, along with approximately 450 additional USAF personnel.

On 21 March 1968, after the SR-71 Blackbird reconnaissance aircraft #61-17974 of the 1st Strategic Reconnaissance Squadron of the 9th Strategic Reconnaissance Wing completed a supersonic high-altitude reconnaissance operation against North Vietnam, due to the bad weather at the Kadena Air Base in Okinawa, two aircraft Under the cover of the KC-135Q aerial tanker, it landed at the Ching Chuan Kang Air Base early. During the process, it also used the call sign of one of the KC-135Q to avoid the PRC’s surveillance. When it entered the Ching Chuan Kang Air Base, the SR-71 pilots Major Jerry O'Malley and Colonel Ed Payne requested permission from the tower to land, and landed in the middle of the two KC-135Qs at a speed of 175 knots. Immediately after landing, the photographed film was transported to Yokota Air Base in Tokyo by C-130 transporter for processing. It was also the first long-range strategic reconnaissance plane that landed in Taiwan. They returned to Kadena Air base on 23 March.

On 31 May 1968, the 6217th Combat Support Group was disbanded.

Two Martin EB-57 Canberras from the 347th Tactical Fighter Wing based at Yokota AB Japan deployed to CCK, between 29 November and 8 December 1968. These aircraft provided Republic of China Air Defense pilots an opportunity to detect and intercept enemy aircraft that used electronic countermeasure (ECM) equipment.

5 December 1969, a C-130E - 50th Tactical Airlift Squadron 62-1800 crashed about 6 miles (9.65 km) south of Tainan Air Base. 2 October 1970, a c-130 departed Songshan Airport in Taipei with incoming Airforce personnel to CCK. It crashed 6 minutes after take off on top of a mountain and all on board were killed. That aircraft was one of two c-130 sent from CCK to Songshan Airport in Taipei to transport incoming personnel. On 20 February 1972 a Lockheed HC-130 set a world record [that still stands] for a great circle distance without landing with a turboprop aircraft of 8,732.09 miles (14,052.94 km), flying from Ching Chuan Kang AB to Scott AFB, Illinois.

The 18th Tactical Fighter Wing based at Kadena AB, Okinawa maintained two Squadron of McDonnell F-4C Phantom II aircraft from November 1972 until May 1975.

On 6 November 1972, the 18th Wing dispatched the McDonnell Douglas F-4C/D Phantom II fighters of 44th Fighter Squadron and 67th Fighter Squadron to the Ching Chuan Kang Air Base until 31 May 1975, to assist Taiwan's defense against aerial threats from China.

The following are the units that the 18th Tactical Fighter Wing once stationed at Ching Chuan Kang Air Base in Taiwan：

- 44th Tactical Fighter Squadron (Tail Code: ZL) (6 November 1972 – 10 April 1975) (F-4C/D)
- 67th Tactical Fighter Squadron (Tail Code: ZG) (6 November 1972 – 31 May 1975) (EF-4C, F-4D)

In March 1973, the number of US troops stationed at CCK was about 5,000.

16 September 1973 - A 44th Tactical Fighter Squadron F-4C aircraft crashed during a temporary duty assignment in Taiwan; the crewmembers safely ejected.

15 October 1973, an EF-4C 63-7462 of the 67th Tactical Fighter Squadron crashed shortly after takeoff from CCK AB.

On 13 November 1973, the 374th TAW was reassigned to Clark Air Base in the Philippines.

On November 15, 1973, the 6217th Combat Support Group was reactivated.

On 1 September 1974, the 6217th Combat Support Group was renamed the 6217th Tactical Group.

On 10 April 1975, the 44th Tactical Fighter Squadron of the 18th Tactical Fighter Wing withdrew from Ching Chuan Kang Air Base in Taichung, Taiwan, total of 24 McDonnell F-4C/D Phantom II fighters and 450 pilots and ground crews to Kadena Air Base in Okinawa.

In May 1975, the 67th Tactical Fighter Squadron was withdrawn from CCK AB, Taiwan, with the final squadron of 18 F-4Cs departing for Kadena Air Base, Okinawa, between 27 and 31 May.

From 1 June 1975, due to the withdrawal of F-4 fighter jets, the 6217th Tactical Group was reorganized to the 6217th Air Base Squadron, and CCK AB had been placed in caretaker status. By 31 July 1975, the number of US troops stationed at CCK AB was 571. From 1977, the number of US troops stationed at CCK AB has been reduced to 100.

On 1 January 1979, the US normalized relations with the People's Republic of China (PRC). on 25 April 1979, which resulted in the lowering of the national flag by US Air Force personnel and their withdrawal from the base.

=== World's longest turboprop aircraft distance record ===
On 20 February 1972, Lieutenant Colonel Edgar Allison, USAF, and his flight crew set a recognized turboprop aircraft class record of 8,732.09 miles (14,052.94 km) for a great circle distance without landing. The USAF Lockheed HC-130H was flown from Ching Chuan Kang Air Base to Scott Air Force Base, Illinois in the United States. As of 2018, this record still stands more than 40 years later.

== Accidents and incidents ==
On 21 January 2025, a master sergeant officer of the Republic of China Air Force died after being sucked into a fighter jet engine during a routine final checkup of the aircraft inside a hangar.

== See also ==
- Tactical Air Command
- Strategic Air Command
- Pacific Air Forces
- List of United States Air Force installations in Taiwan
