= Killing of Walter Scott =

2015 fatal shooting in North Charleston, South Carolina

- Witness video image, shows Officer Slager shooting Walter Scott
- Location: 32.89926°N 80.01394°W; (traffic stop); 32.8982°N 80.0145°W; (shooting); North Charleston, South Carolina, U.S.
- Date: April 4, 2015; 9:30 a.m. (EDT)
- Attack type: Police killing, homicide by shooting
- Victims: Walter Lamar Scott, aged 50
- Perpetrator: Michael Thomas Slager
- Charges: Federal; Deprivation of rights under color of law resulting in death (Note: Underlying offenses of second degree murder and obstruction of justice); State; Murder
- Verdict: Federal; Guilty; State; Mistrial (Note: 11-1 in favor of guilty verdict. Charge dropped after federal conviction.)
- Sentence: 20 years in federal prison

On April 4, 2015, Walter Scott, a 50-year-old Black man, was fatally shot by Michael Slager, a local police officer in North Charleston, South Carolina, United States. Slager had stopped Scott for a non-functioning brake light. Slager was charged with murder after a video surfaced showing him shooting Scott from behind while Scott fled, which contradicted Slager's report. The racial difference led to the belief that the shooting was racially motivated, generating widespread controversy.

The case was independently investigated by the South Carolina Law Enforcement Division (SLED). The Federal Bureau of Investigation (FBI), the Office of the U.S. Attorney for the District of South Carolina, and the Justice Department's Civil Rights Division conducted their own investigations. In June 2015, a South Carolina grand jury indicted Slager on a charge of murder. He was released on bond in January 2016. In late 2016, a five-week trial ended in a mistrial due to a hung jury. In May 2016, Slager was indicted on federal charges including violation of Scott's civil rights and obstruction of justice. In a May 2017 plea agreement, Slager pleaded guilty to federal charges of civil rights violations, and he was returned to jail pending sentencing. In return for his guilty plea, the state's murder charges were dropped.

In December 2017, Slager was sentenced to 20 years in prison, with the judge determining that the underlying offenses were second degree murder and obstruction of justice.

== Persons involved ==
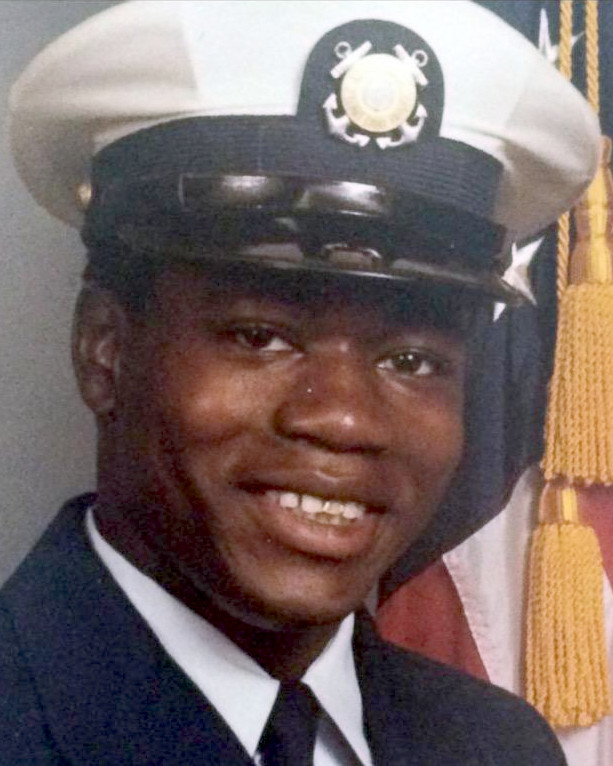
Scott during his service in the U.S. Coast Guard in the mid-1980s

- Walter Lamar Scott (Note: This is the name spelling used in the state grand jury indictment document as well as in many news sources. Many other news sources spelled Scott's middle name as "Lamer".) was a 50-year-old forklift operator, studying massage therapy. An arrest warrant had been issued after a January 16, 2013, court hearing over missed child support payments, for which he had been jailed three times earlier. Scott had served two years in the U.S. Coast Guard before being given a general discharge in 1986 for a drug-related offense.
- Michael Thomas Slager, 33 years old at the time of the incident, served in the North Charleston Police Department (NCPD) for five years and five months prior to the shooting. Before becoming a police officer, he served in the U.S. Coast Guard. Slager was named in a police complaint in 2013 for allegedly using a Taser on a man without cause. Slager was cleared by the police department over the incident; the victim and several witnesses said they were not interviewed. Following the Scott killing, North Charleston police stated they would review the 2013 complaint. Slager was named in a second tasing-without-cause complaint following an August 2014 police stop. A complaint filed in January 2015 resulted in Slager being cited for failing to file a report. Personnel documents describe Slager as having demonstrated "great officer safety tactics" in dealing with suspects, and note his proficiency with a Taser.

== Killing ==
At 9:30 a.m., April 4, 2015, in the parking lot of an auto parts store at 1945 Remount Road, Slager stopped Scott for a non-functioning third brake light. Scott was driving a 1991 Mercedes, and, according to his brother, was headed to the auto parts store when he was stopped. The video from Slager's dashcam shows him approaching Scott's car, speaking to Scott, and then returning to his patrol car. Scott exited his car and fled, with Slager giving chase on foot.

Slager pursued Scott into a lot behind a pawn shop at 5654 Rivers Avenue, and the two became involved in a physical altercation. At some point before or during the struggle, Slager fired his Taser, hitting Scott. Scott fled, and Slager drew his .45-caliber Glock 21 handgun, firing eight rounds at him from behind. The coroner's report stated that Scott was struck a total of five times: three times in the back, once in the upper buttocks, and once on an ear. During Slager's state trial, forensic pathologist Lee Marie Tormos testified that the fatal wound was caused by a bullet that entered Scott's back and struck his lungs and heart.

Immediately following the shooting, Slager radioed a dispatcher, stating, "Shots fired and the subject is down. He grabbed my Taser."

When Slager fired his gun, Scott was approximately 15 to 20 feet (5 to 6 m) away and fleeing. In the report of the shooting filed before the video surfaced, Slager said he had feared for his life because Scott had taken his Taser, and that he shot Scott because he "felt threatened".

A passenger in Scott's car, reported to be a male co-worker and friend, was later placed in the back of a police vehicle and briefly detained.

A toxicology report showed that Scott had cocaine and alcohol in his system at the time of his death. The level of cocaine was less than half the average amount for "typical impaired drivers", according to the report. Tormos testified that Scott did not test positive for alcohol.

=== Eyewitness video ===
External videos
- Shooting on Vimeo (3:12)
- Shooting on YouTube (3:49)

An eyewitness to the shooting, Feidin Santana, recorded video of the incident on his phone. At first Santana did not share the video out of fear of retribution, but he became angered when the police report differed from his view of the events. In an interview on MSNBC, Santana said, "I felt that my life, with this information, might be in danger. I thought about erasing the video and just getting out of the community, you know Charleston, and living some place else." The video was subsequently shared with Scott's family through an activist of Black Lives Matter, and later with the news media.

Santana said that after a struggle in which Slager deployed his Taser, Scott was "just trying to get away from the Taser," and that before he started recording, he observed that Slager "had control of the situation". In an interview on The Today Show, Santana said Scott "never grabbed the Taser of the police. He never got the Taser."

After Scott was shot and had dropped to the ground, Slager approached him, repeatedly instructed him to place his hands behind his back, and handcuffed him, leaving him face down on the ground. Although police reports stated that officers performed CPR on Scott, no such action is visible on the video. The video shows that Slager ran back toward where the initial scuffle occurred and picked something up off the ground. Moments later, he dropped the object, possibly the Taser, beside Scott's body.

Another officer, Clarence W. Habersham Jr., is seen in the video; he puts on medical gloves and appears to examine Scott.

== Aftermath ==
Critics, such as the Reverend Al Sharpton and the predominantly African-American National Bar Association, called for the prosecution of Clarence Habersham, the second officer seen in the video, alleging an attempted cover-up and questioning "whether Habersham omitted significant information from his report." Critics also questioned Habersham's statement in his report that he "attempted to render aid to the victim by applying pressure to the gunshot wounds," saying that the videotape shows little attempt to aid Scott after the shooting.

Slager's original lawyer, David Aylor, withdrew as counsel within hours of the release of the video; he did not publicly give a reason for his withdrawal, citing attorney–client privilege.

In March 2016, North Charleston Police Department Assistant Chief of Police Reggie Burgess offered a public apology for the killing.

On April 8, the North Charleston city manager announced that the NCPD had fired Slager but would continue to pay for his health insurance because his wife was pregnant. The town's mayor, Keith Summey, said they had ordered an additional 150 body cameras, enough that one could be worn by every police officer.

A GoFundMe campaign was started to raise money for Slager's defense, but it was quickly shut down by the site. Citing privacy concerns, they declined to go into detail about why the campaign was canceled, saying only that it was "due to a violation of our terms and conditions".

Scott's funeral took place on April 11, at the W.O.R.D. Ministries Christian Center in Summerville, about 20 miles from North Charleston.

Scott's killing further fueled a national conversation around race and policing. It has been connected to similar controversial police shootings of black men in Missouri, New York, and elsewhere. The Black Lives Matter movement protested Scott's death.

A bill in the South Carolina state house, designed to equip more police officers with body cameras, was renamed for Scott. The Senate set aside $3.4 million to fund it, enough to buy 2,000 cameras for South Carolina officers.

In May 2016, a short documentary film about the shooting called Frame 394 was released by the Canadian Broadcasting Corporation. The documentary is about Daniel Voshart, a Canadian cinematographer and image stabilization specialist, who claims to have discovered evidence in frame 394 of the shooting video "that challenged the accepted narrative of what transpired between Slager and Scott"; and it follows his "moral dilemma of what to do with this potential key evidence". Initially, Voshart examined the footage to help indict Slager, having been convinced by the footage that it "was an example of police corruption at its worst". After clarifying the video and inspecting frame 394, however, he noticed that as Slager began reaching to draw his firearm, it appeared that Scott was still holding Slager's Taser, "potentially enough to make Slager fear for his life and maybe meet the grounds needed to use lethal force." It was impactful in Slager's trial after Voshart showed Slager's lawyer, Andy Savage, the stabilized video. During the trial, the officer "testified that he did not realize the Taser had fallen behind him when he fired the fatal shots."

=== Investigation ===
Separate investigations were conducted by the FBI, the U.S. Attorney in South Carolina, the Justice Department's Civil Rights Division, and the South Carolina Law Enforcement Division (SLED). An autopsy was performed by the Charleston County coroner on April 4, 2015, which showed that Scott had been shot in the back multiple times. The coroner ruled the death a homicide.

=== Prosecution of Slager ===
After the police department reviewed the video, Slager was arrested on April 7 and charged with murder. On June 8, a South Carolina grand jury indicted Slager on the murder charge. (Note: South Carolina law defines only one type of murder: "unlawful killing with malice aforethought".) The murder charge was the only charge presented to the grand jury.

On January 4, 2016, after being held without bail for almost nine months, Slager was released on $500,000 bond. He was confined to house arrest until the trial, which began October 31, 2016. On December 5, Judge Clifton Newman declared a mistrial after the jury became deadlocked with 11 of the 12 jurors favoring a conviction. A retrial was scheduled for August 2017. However, the state charges were dropped as a result of Slager pleading guilty to a federal charge.

On May 11, 2016, Slager was indicted on federal charges of violating Scott's civil rights and unlawfully using a weapon during the commission of a crime. In addition, he was charged with obstruction of justice as a result of his statement to state investigators that Scott was moving toward him with the Taser when he shot him. Slager pleaded not guilty, and a trial was scheduled to begin in May 2017. Slager faced up to life in prison if convicted.

On May 2, 2017, as part of a plea agreement, Slager pleaded guilty to deprivation of rights under color of law (18 USC § 242). In return for the guilty plea, the charges of obstructing justice and use of a firearm during a crime of violence were dismissed.

On December 7, 2017, U.S. District Judge David C. Norton sentenced Slager to 20 years in prison. Although defense attorneys had argued for voluntary manslaughter, the judge agreed with prosecutors that the "appropriate underlying offense" was second degree murder. Because there is no parole in the federal justice system, Slager will likely remain in prison for about 17 years after credit for time served in jail. He began serving his sentence in Colorado's Federal Correctional Institution, Englewood in February 2018. An appeal for reduction of sentence was denied on January 6, 2019. As of 2025, Slager, Federal Bureau of Prisons #31292-171, is still at FCI Englewood; his earliest possible release is August 16, 2032. On April 13, 2021, Slager went back to court asking for a reduction of his sentence. He claimed his defense was incompetent and that he was not involved in the negotiations over the plea deal. The court ruled against Slager and upheld the sentence on April 19.

=== Civil settlement ===
In an out-of-court settlement, the City of North Charleston agreed in October 2015 to pay $6.5 million to Scott's family.

=== Walter Scott Notification Act ===
The Walter Scott Notification Act is proposed federal legislation by U.S. Senator Tim Scott (no relation) (R-SC) to require the reporting of police shootings by any state receiving federal funding for law enforcement.

== See also ==
- Lists of killings by law enforcement officers in the United States
