= Charleston International Airport =

Airport serving Charleston, South Carolina, USA

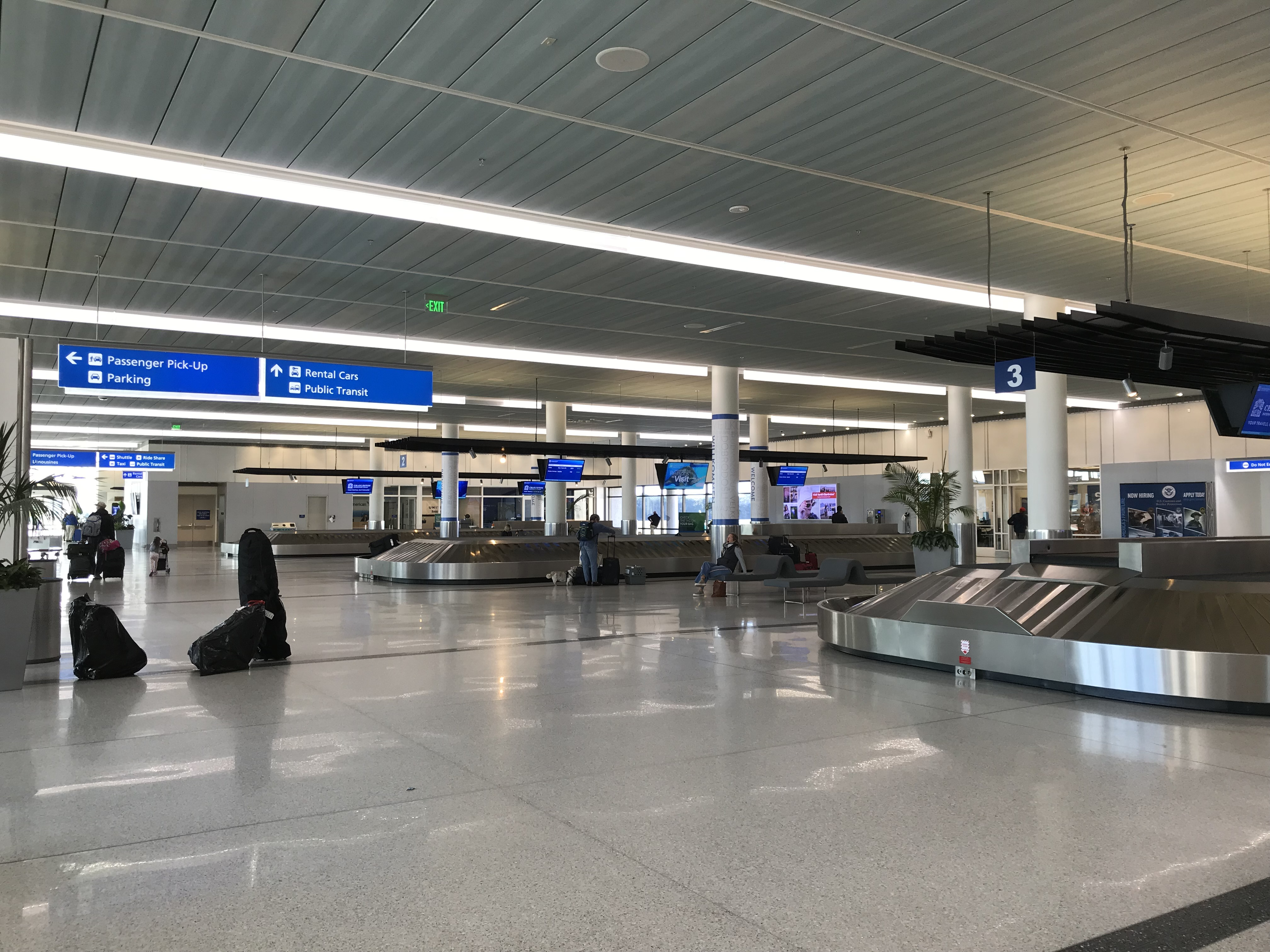
- Baggage claim in terminal
- IATA: CHS; ICAO: KCHS; FAA LID: CHS

Summary
- Airport type: Public / military
- Owner: Charleston County; Joint Base Charleston
- Operator: Charleston County Aviation Authority
- Serves: Charleston
- Location: North Charleston, S.C. (US)
- Operating base for: Breeze Airways
- Elevation AMSL: 46 ft (14 m)
- Coordinates: 32°53′55″N 080°02′26″W
- Website: iflychs.com

Maps
- FAA diagram as of January 2021
- Interactive map of Charleston International Airport

Runways
Direction	Length		Surface
Direction	ft	m	Surface
03/21	7,000	2,134	Concrete
15/33	9,001	2,744	Concrete

Statistics (2025)
- Total passengers: 6,341,145 ▲0.7%
- Aircraft operations: 131,842
- Source: Charleston Co. Aviation Authority, Federal Aviation Administration

Charleston International Airport (IATA: CHS, ICAO: KCHS, FAA LID: CHS) is a joint civil-military airport located in North Charleston, South Carolina, United States. The airport is operated by the Charleston County Aviation Authority under a joint-use agreement with Joint Base Charleston. It is South Carolina's busiest airport; in 2023 the airport served over 6.1 million passengers in its busiest year on record. The airport is in North Charleston and is approximately 12 miles (19 km) northwest of downtown Charleston. The airport serves as a focus city for Breeze Airways. It is also home to the Boeing facility that assembles the 787 Dreamliner.

== History ==
In 1928, the Charleston Airport Corporation was founded and purchased 700 acres (280 ha) of land previously belonging to a mining company. Although privately developed at first, the City of Charleston floated bonds in 1931 to acquire a portion of the site for passenger service. Within ten years, three runways were paved and outfitted with lighting for nighttime operations. In World War II, control of the airfield passed to the United States Army though civilian service was allowed to continue to use the airfield. After the war, the airfield reverted to civilian use for a short time. In 1949, a new passenger terminal was built.

During the Korean War, the airfield was reactivated for military use and in 1952, the City of Charleston and the United States Air Force reached an agreement on control of the base and the runways—an arrangement that has been renegotiated over time and that continues to this day. In 1979, the civilian portions of the airport were transferred from the City of Charleston to the Charleston County Aviation Authority, which had operated two other airports in the area. The current terminal on the south end of the airport was built in the 1980s on land acquired by Georgia Pacific.

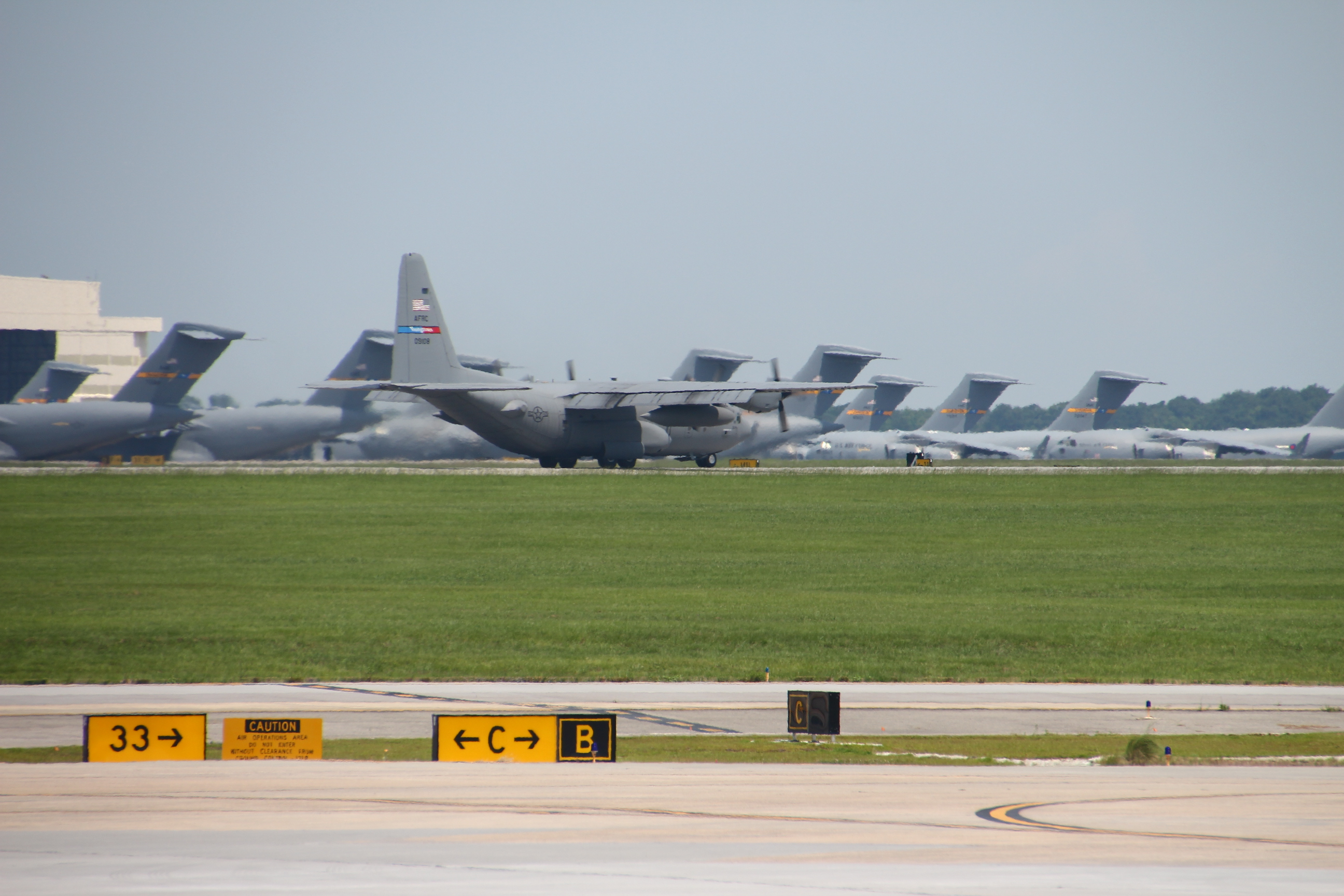
View of Charleston Field, a U.S. Air Force base

In October 2009, Boeing announced that it would build a major plant on 265 acres (107 ha) at the airport as a second final assembly site for its 787 Dreamliner commercial aircraft. The facility began limited operations in July 2011 and rolled out its first completed aircraft in April 2012. Additional facilities to complement aircraft assembly have since been announced by the company.

Since 2010, the airport's passenger figures have doubled. New services established by additional airlines during this time along with increased services from the three legacy carriers have contributed to this growth.

In 2021, the newly established Breeze Airways announced that the airport would serve as a focus city for the airline and announced service to 11 cities. In 2022, the airport authority announced a 20-year master plan for future growth of the airport, including the constructing of an additional concourse, adding up to 11 new gates, providing additional plane stands, and expanding parking facilities for vehicles.

The airport has had brief periods of international service. In 2001, Air Canada briefly served the airport from Toronto but ended service immediately after the September 11th attacks in 2001. Porter Airlines briefly served Charleston with flights to Toronto in 2015. In April 2019, British Airways launched a seasonal route to London's Heathrow Airport. This was Charleston's first transatlantic flight. The first season ended in October. Due to the COVID-19 pandemic, the service was suspended in 2020. In 2023, Air Canada announced a return to Charleston with daily nonstop flights to Toronto starting in March 2024.

== Facilities ==
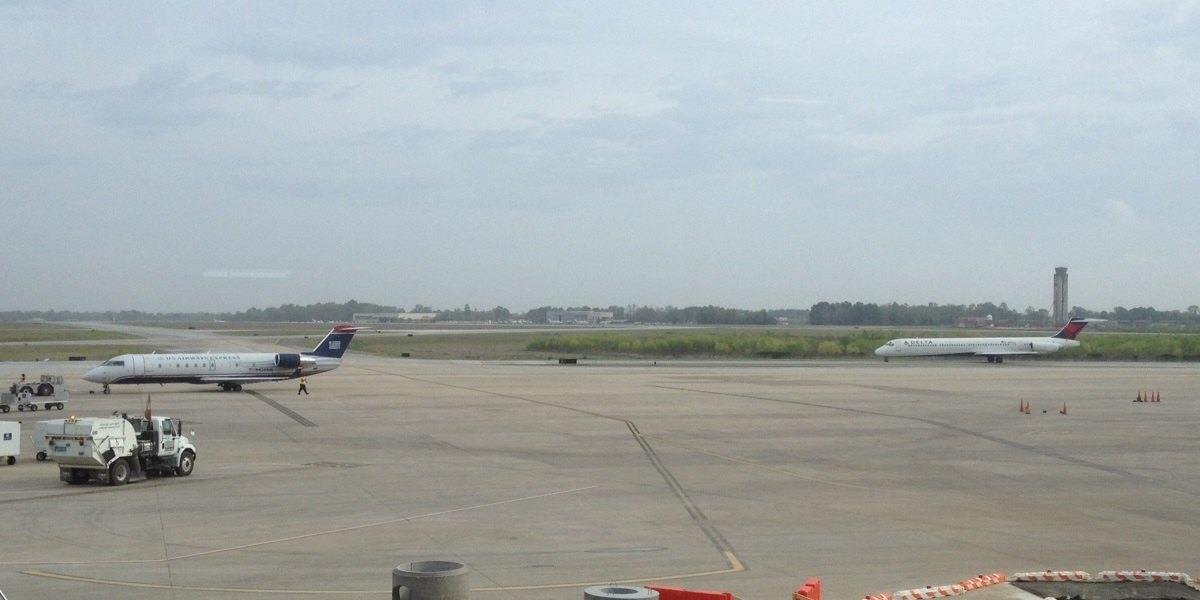
View of the airfield from the passenger terminal

The airport consists of four general areas: the military area to the west, the airline terminal to the south, the general aviation area to the east, and the Boeing assembly area further to the south. The combined airport area of Charleston International Airport and Charleston Air Force Base covers 2,060 acres (830 ha) and has two runways: 15/33, 9,001 ft × 200 ft (2,744 m × 61 m) and 03/21, 7,000 ft × 150 ft (2,134 m × 46 m).

For the 12-month period ending May 31, 2019, the airport had 118,211 aircraft operations, an average of 324 per day: 42% commercial, 28% general aviation, 16% military, and 13% air taxi. In May 2019, there were 81 aircraft based at this airport: 28 single-engine, 6 multi-engine, 43 jet, and 4 helicopter.

Joint Base Charleston owns and operates the runways at the airport and has an agreement with the Charleston County Aviation Authority to allow civilian use of the field. General aviation services are operated by the Charleston County Aviation Authority. Boeing South Carolina operates the Boeing assembly area.

=== Terminal ===
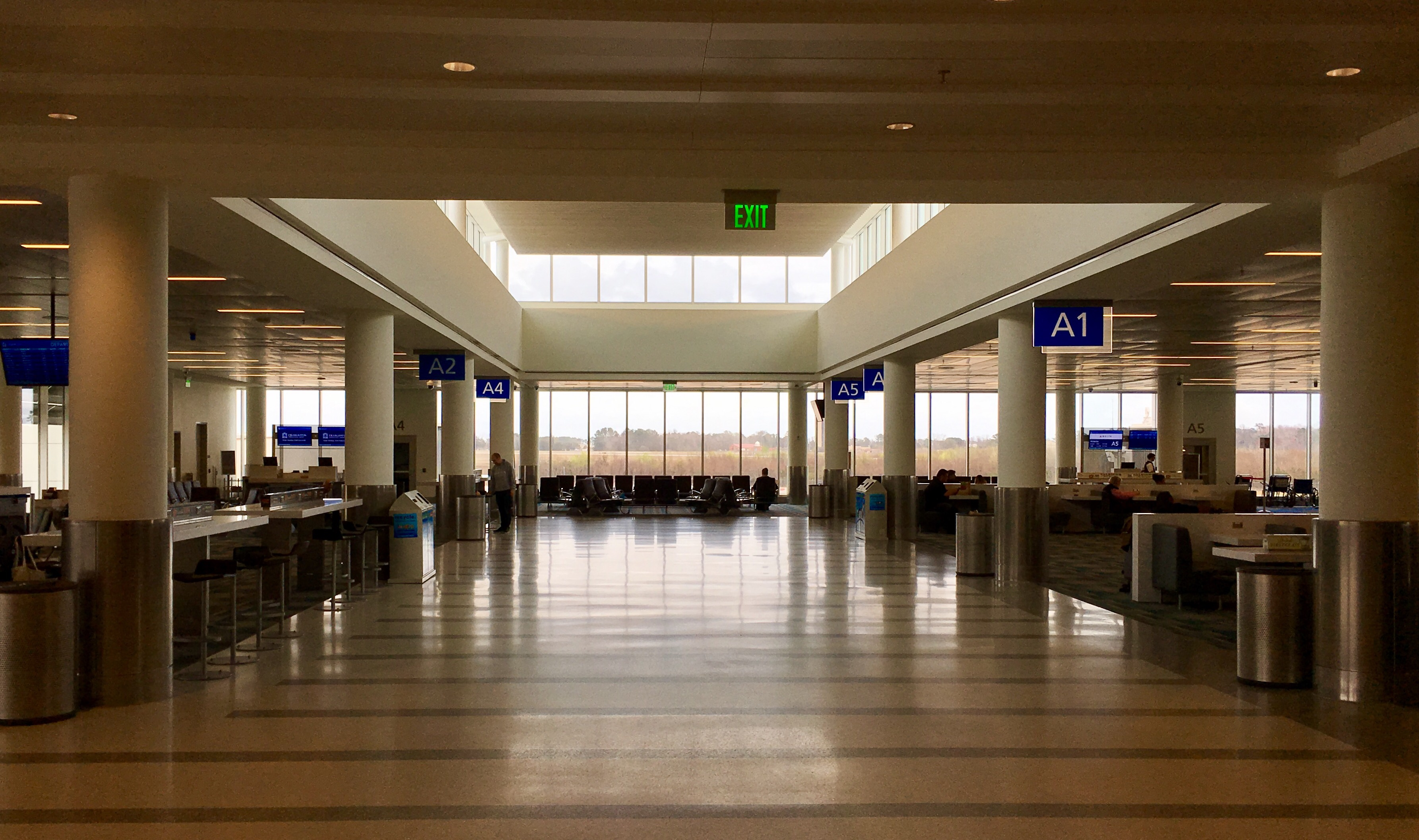
Interior of Concourse A

The current airline terminal completed a three-year, $200 million redevelopment project in 2016 which added five gates and significantly renovated the interior appearance of the facility. The original terminal was built in 1985 and was designed by Howard Needles Tammen & Bergendoff, Davis & Floyd, Inc., and Lucas & Stubbs.

Both departures and arrivals are located on the same floor, with the departure area to the east end of the terminal and the arrival area to the west end. Flights depart from two concourses: Concourse A towards the east and Concourse B towards the west. Since 2015, a consolidated TSA security checkpoint is utilized for both concourses. Charleston International Airport is classified as a security-level Category I airport by the TSA. The airport is equipped to handle international flights.

Concourse A contains eight gates (A1, A2, A2A, and A3-A7) that are primarily used by Delta Air Lines and Delta Connection, with other airlines occasionally using gates as needed for overflow. Concourse B contains ten gates (B1-B10) and is used by other airlines serving the airport. Concourse B also contains the international arrivals facility.

=== Ground transportation ===
Charleston International Airport is located near the interchange of Interstate 26 and Interstate 526 and is accessible from both interstates using International Boulevard and Montague Avenue exits. The airport offers a free cell phone parking lot for passenger pickups. For short-term and long-term parking, the airport offers surface or garage parking for up to 30 days. Rental cars from major companies are available. The airport completed a rental car pavilion adjacent to the terminal in 2014.

CARTA, the regional mass transit system, serves the airport with one bus route that operates seven days a week.

- CARTA Route 11 is a local service that connects the airport to downtown Charleston with several stops along Dorchester Road and Meeting Street in North Charleston. Total trip time from the airport to downtown is usually 50–55 minutes.

== Airlines and destinations ==
=== Passenger ===
Airlines	Destinations	Refs
Alaska Airlines	Seattle/Tacoma	
Allegiant Air	Cincinnati; Seasonal: Columbus–Rickenbacker, Indianapolis, Louisville	
American Airlines	Charlotte, Dallas/Fort Worth, Miami, Philadelphia; Seasonal: Chicago–O'Hare, Washington–National	
American Eagle	Charlotte, Chicago–O'Hare, New York–LaGuardia, Philadelphia, Washington–National; Seasonal: Dallas/Fort Worth, Miami	
Avelo Airlines	Seasonal: New Haven	
Breeze Airways	Akron/Canton, Albany, Atlantic City, Buffalo (begins July 2, 2027), Cincinnati, Columbus–Glenn, Fort Lauderdale, Fort Myers, Hartford, Long Island/Islip, Louisville, Manchester (NH), New Haven, New Orleans, Newburgh, Norfolk, Orlando, Pittsburgh, Portland (ME), Providence, Richmond, Rochester (NY), Syracuse, Tampa, Trenton, White Plains; Seasonal: Burlington (VT), Cancún, Los Angeles, West Palm Beach	
Delta Air Lines	Atlanta, Boston, Minneapolis/St. Paul, New York–LaGuardia; Seasonal: Detroit	
Delta Connection	Boston, Detroit, New York–JFK, New York–LaGuardia	
JetBlue	Boston, Fort Lauderdale, New York–JFK	
Southwest Airlines	Baltimore, Chicago–Midway, Dallas–Love, Denver, Nashville; Seasonal: Austin, Houston–Hobby, Kansas City, St. Louis	
United Airlines	Chicago–O'Hare, Denver, Newark, San Francisco (begins March 28, 2027), Washington–Dulles; Seasonal: Houston–Intercontinental	
United Express	Chicago–O'Hare, Houston–Intercontinental, Newark, Washington–Dulles	

=== Cargo ===
Airlines	Destinations
Atlas Air	Anchorage, Miami, Nagoya–Centrair, Taranto, Wichita–McConnell
FedEx Express	Greensboro, Memphis, Nashville
FedEx Feeder	Greensboro, Memphis
Western Global Airlines	Fort Myers

== Statistics ==
=== Airline market share ===
Largest airlines at CHS (February 2025 - January 2026)
Rank	Airline	Passengers	Share
1	American Airlines	1,169,000	18.65%
2	Delta Air Lines	1,152,000	18.38%
3	Southwest Airlines	846,000	13.49%
4	Breeze Airways	775,000	12.37%
5	United Airlines	524,000	8.36%
6	Other	1,802,000	28.75%

=== Top destinations ===
Busiest domestic routes from CHS (February 2025 – January 2026)
Rank	City	Passengers	Carriers
1	Atlanta, Georgia	447,010	Delta
2	Charlotte, North Carolina	269,880	American
3	Dallas/Fort Worth, Texas	151,530	American, Frontier
4	Newark, New Jersey	151,230	United
5	Chicago-O'Hare, Illinois	149,830	American, United
6	Baltimore, Maryland	136,690	Southwest, Spirit
7	New York-JFK, New York	134,820	Delta, JetBlue
8	Boston, Massachusetts	134,290	Delta, JetBlue, Spirit
9	Philadelphia, Pennsylvania	129,840	American, Frontier
10	New York-LaGuardia, New York	117,330	American, Delta, Spirit

=== Annual traffic ===
Annual passenger traffic at CHS, 2003 to present
Year	Passengers	Year	Passengers	Year	Passengers
2003	1,616,255	2013	2,913,265	2023	6,153,540
2004	1,828,597	2014	3,131,072	2024	6,295,439
2005	2,143,105	2015	3,415,952	2025	6,341,145
2006	1,877,631	2016	3,708,133	2026	
2007	2,275,541	2017	3,987,427	2027	
2008	2,334,219	2018	4,470,239	2028	
2009	2,190,251	2019	4,871,062	2029	
2010	2,021,328	2020	1,952,271	2030	
2011	2,520,829	2021	4,181,588	2031	
2012	2,593,063	2022	5,322,147	2032	

== Accidents and incidents ==
- December 31, 1946: A Douglas C-47 operated by Inter Continental Air Transport crashed after a missed first approach. He attempted to remain visual while flying below a 500-foot (150 m) ragged ceiling. Flying over dark, heavily wooded terrain, the left wing struck treetops, lost control and crashed 3.1 miles (5.0 km) NW of Charleston. All five occupants (three crew, two passengers) perished.
- March 14, 1947: a Douglas DC-3 operated by US Airlines approached Charleston low and left of the runway, struck trees 3,800 feet (1,200 m) from the runway, crashed and burned. Both occupants were killed.
- August 23, 1955: A USAF Kaiser-Frazer Fairchild C-119 Flying Boxcar impacted a tree and crashed after a takeoff for a night flight in a residential area, 1.7 miles (2.7 km) SE of Charleston AFB. A fire erupted, destroying several homes. Reports said one engine was on fire when the crash occurred. Five of the 11 occupants on the aircraft were killed and four on the ground died.
- October 3, 1956: A USAF Douglas C-124 Globemaster II crashed on approach 0.9 miles (1.4 km) NW of Charleston AFB when the pilot descended below minimums, struck trees and crashed. Three of the 10 on board were killed.
- September 18, 1979: A USAF Lockheed C-141 Starlifter caught fire after touchdown at CHS when the landing gear retracted along with several other mechanical issues occurring at once. The aircraft was destroyed, but there were no fatalities.
- November 2, 2020: Joel T. Drogomir was arrested on a charge "conveying false information regarding attempted use of a destructive device" after he falsely threatened to have a bomb.

== See also ==
- List of airports in South Carolina
- Boeing South Carolina
- Charleston Air Force Base
