= Reggie Burgess =

Mayor, City of North Charleston

- Burgess in 2024

4th mayor of North Charleston
- Incumbent
- Assumed office January 2, 2024

Personal details
- Born: North Charleston, South Carolina, U.S.
- Website: https://www.northcharleston.org/government/office_of_the_mayor/index.php

Reginald L. 'Reggie' Burgess is an American law enforcement official and politician, serving as the 4th mayor of the City of North Charleston, South Carolina. Burgess is the first African-American mayor in the City's history.

== Early life, education and career ==
Burgess and a younger brother were raised by a single mother in North Charleston.

Burgess served as a police officer for 24 years, becoming chief in 2018, the first African-American police chief in the city's history.

In 2019, Governor Henry McMaster nominated Burgess to Director of Public Safety, which would have to be confirmed by the legislature. Burgess accepted and later declined the nomination.

He announced his retirement in 2023.

=== Walter Scott killing ===
See also: Killing of Walter Scott

On April 4, 2015, Walter Scott was shot and killed by Michael Thomas Slager, a North Charleston Police Department Officer. At the time, Burgess was North Charleston assistant chief of police. Burgess issued a public apology for the killing.

As North Charleston's police chief, Burgess worked to improve police accountability and community relations after the Scott killing.

== Political career ==
=== 2023 mayoral election ===
On March 24, 2023, Burgess announced his run for mayor, after the incumbent mayor declined to run for re-election.

Other candidates who filed:

- Stephanie Ganaway-Pasley
- Rhonda Jameson Jerome
- Curtis A Merriweather Jr
- Todd Olds
- Teddie E Pryor Sr
- John Singletary
- Samuel Whatley I
- Jesse Williams

Endorsers for Burgess included:

- Feidin Santana, the man whose photos of the killing led to Slager's conviction,
- Charleston Metro Chamber of Commerce PAC
- Post and Courier newspaper

Burgess won with 56% of the vote, becoming the first new mayor in close to 30 years.

=== Council controversies ===
On February 27, 2025, Burgess pledged transparency in a statement and an address to the public after three members of North Charleston City Council were charged with federal corruption with one suspended from office by Governor Henry McMaster.
