= Boeing South Carolina =

Airplane assembly facility in North Charleston, South Carolina

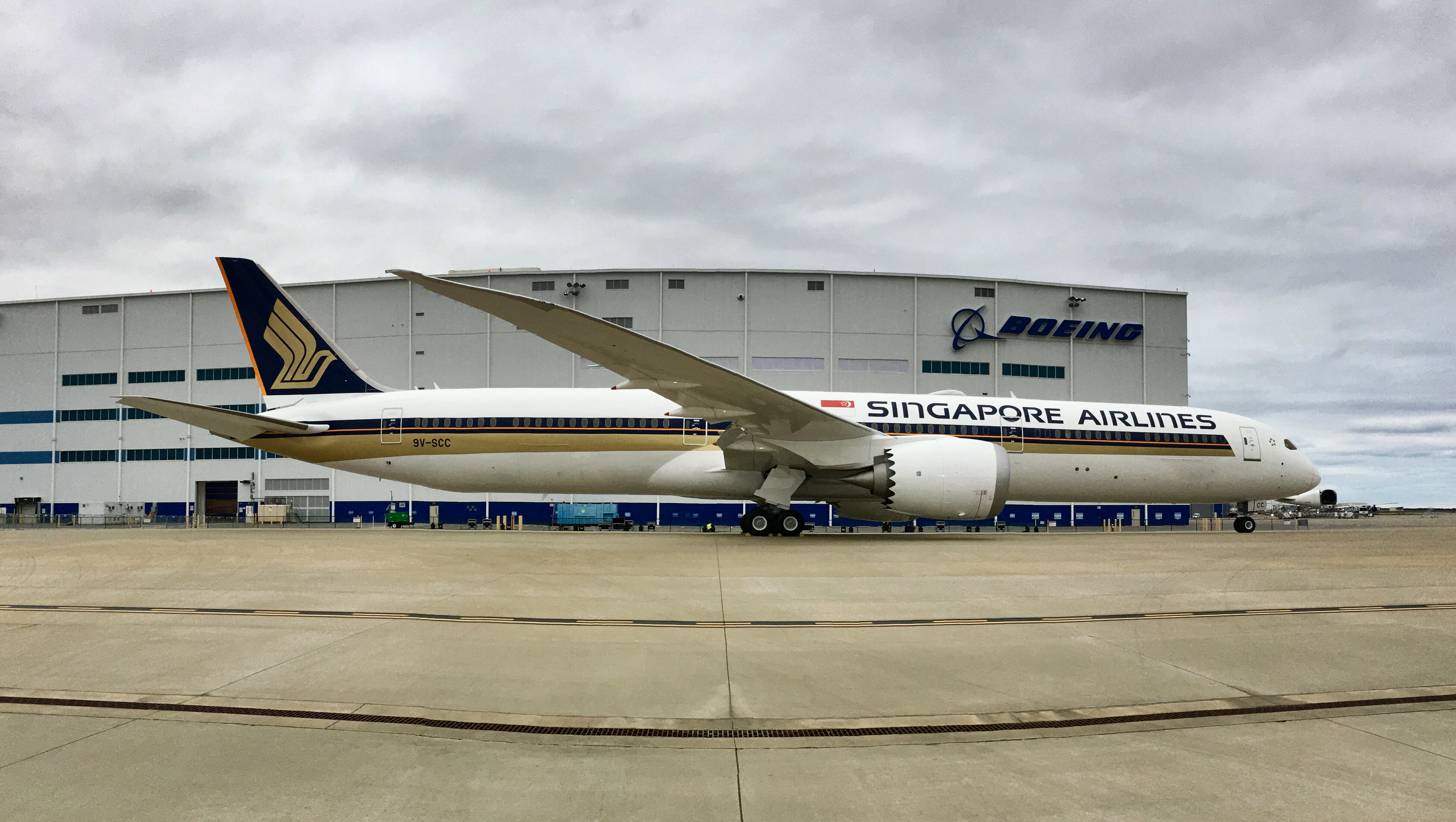
- Boeing 787 Dreamliner outside of Boeing South Carolina building
- Built: October 2009
- Operated: July 2011–Present
- Location: North Charleston, South Carolina, U.S.
- Coordinates: 32.8789°N 80.0306°W
- Industry: Aerospace
- Products: Boeing 787 Dreamliner
- Employees: 6,943 (2017)
- Area: 265 acres (107 ha)
- Owner: Boeing

Boeing South Carolina is an airplane assembly facility operated by Boeing in North Charleston, South Carolina, United States. Located on the grounds of the joint-use Charleston Air Force Base and Charleston International Airport, the site is the final assembly and delivery point for the Boeing 787 Dreamliner. Boeing opened the site in July 2011, after purchasing the facilities of suppliers Vought and Global Aeronautica in 2008 and 2009. The final assembly building covers 1,200,000 square feet (110,000 m^{2}) and opened on November 12, 2011. As of September 28, 2017, the site employs 6,943 workers and contractors.

== History ==
=== Sub-assembly site ===
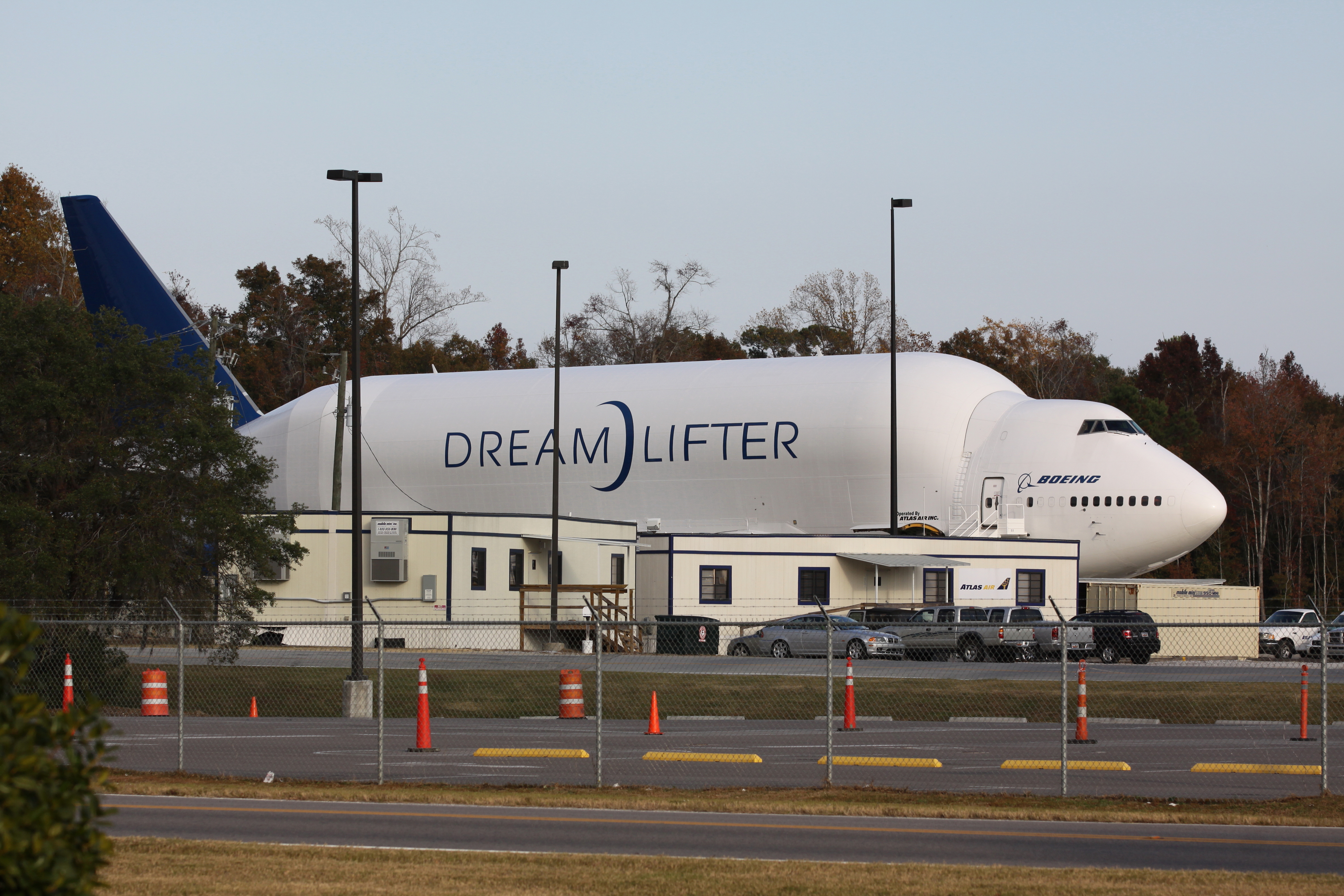
Boeing Dreamlifter, used to carry sub-assemblies of the Dreamliner, parked in South Carolina

The 265-acre (107-hectare) site is located on the southern portions of the joint-use Charleston Air Force Base and Charleston International Airport located in the city of North Charleston, South Carolina.

The site was initially established in 2004 to build components for the Boeing 787 Dreamliner. Instead of conventionally building the 787 from the ground up, Boeing assigned subcontractors to do more assembly work, delivering completed sub-assemblies to the Boeing Everett Factory where workers would join them and integrate systems. This approach was intended to result in a leaner, simpler assembly line and lower inventory, with pre-installed systems reducing final assembly time by three-quarters to three days.

The South Carolina site was used by two of these subcontractors: Vought Aircraft Industries and Global Aeronautica, a joint venture of Vought and Alenia Aeronautica, to build sections of the fuselage out of composite materials. Global Aeronautica would receive mid-fuselage sections from an international supply chain including Alenia factories in Italy, and aft fuselage sections from the Vought factory next door. Global Aeronautica would then assemble these sections and then ship the more than 60 percent complete fuselage to Everett onboard the Boeing Dreamlifter, a fleet of converted 747s. The 334,000-square-foot (31,000 m^{2}) facility broke ground in February 2005 and was completed in late 2006.

Subcontractors had difficulties finishing sub-assemblies on schedule, and for many including Alenia, the work proved unprofitable. Amid these issues, and in an effort to gain more control over the supply chain, Boeing purchased Vought's share of the Global Aeronautica joint venture in June 2008, Vought's standalone operations in July 2009, and Alenia's share of Global Aeronautica in December 2009.

=== Final assembly site ===
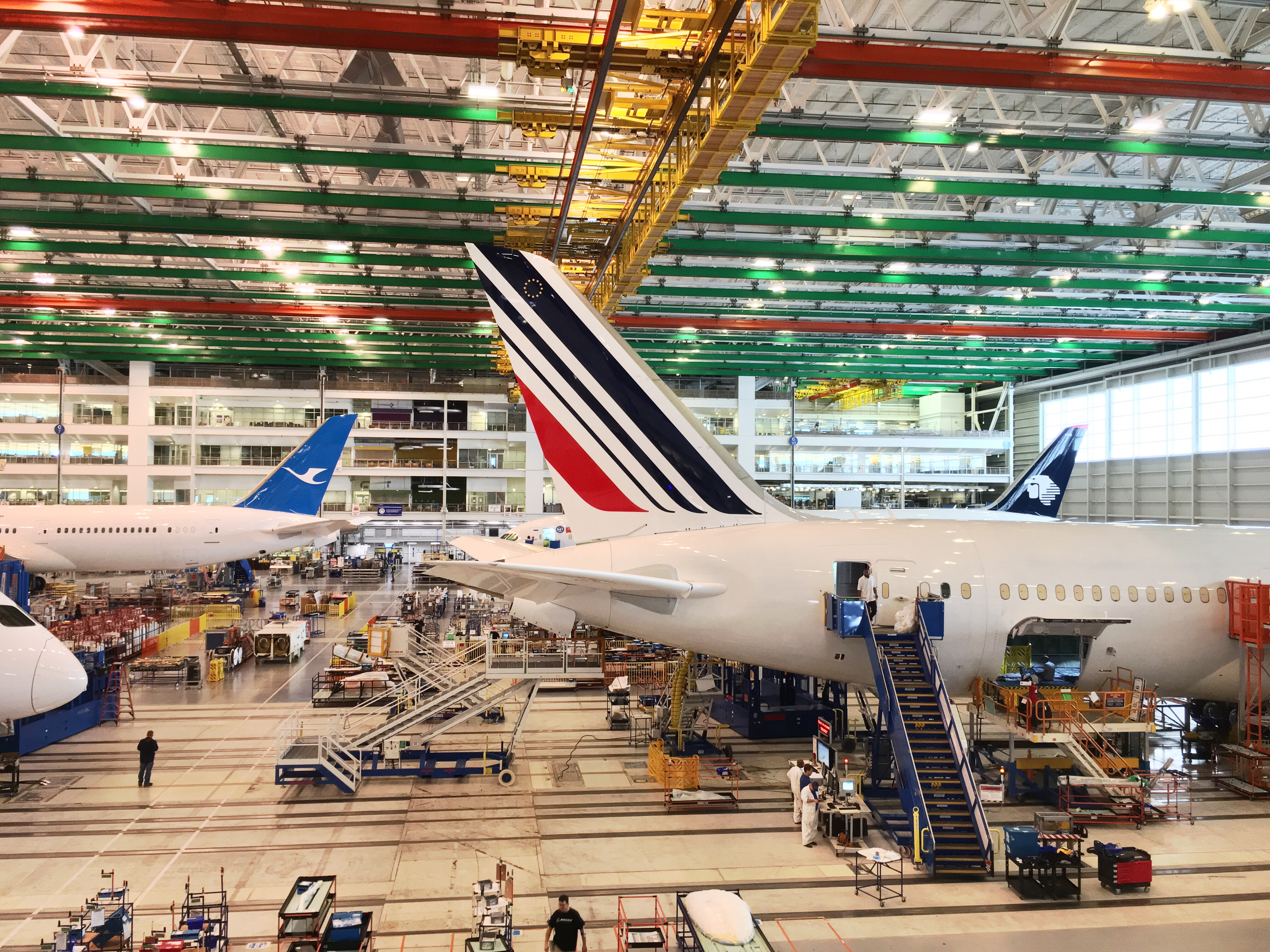
Several Boeing 787 Dreamliner aircraft under construction inside the Boeing South Carolina final assembly building

Now controlling a large site of land in South Carolina, where 60 percent of 787 assembly was already taking place, Boeing announced in October 2009 that it would build a new 787 Dreamliner final assembly and delivery line in North Charleston. Boeing said that the second production line was necessary to "meet the market demand for the airplane," but it came amid tense negotiations between the company and the International Association of Machinists and Aerospace Workers (IAM) union representing workers in Everett who had recently gone on strike. South Carolina's unionisation rates, the lowest in the country at 2.7%, were stated by Boeing management as a reason to transfer production to there. IAM said the decision was retaliatory and National Labor Relations Board agreed, filing a lawsuit against the company in April 2011. The lawsuit was dropped in December after IAM withdrew its complaint as part of a new contract with Boeing, clearing the way for production to begin in South Carolina. Since then, Boeing has continued to challenge the rights of unions to organize at the plant, and is alleged to have fired workers for their attempts to unionize.

Ground was broken for the new 1,200,000-square-foot (110,000 m^{2}) final assembly building in November 2009. The building contains eight positions for aircraft assembly and multiple floors of offices, conference rooms, and equipment storage. 18,000 tons of structural steel was used during the assembly and the building is 1,041 feet long by 618 feet wide. The building also hosted 10 acres (440,000 sq ft; 40,000 m^{2}) of solar panels on the roof that could generate up to 2.6 megawatts of electricity that was able to power the plant and giant autoclaves. The solar panels were removed in 2022. Limited production began in July 2011, with the first airplane rolling out of the final assembly on April 27, 2012, taking its first flight on May 23, and delivered to Air India on October 5.

In addition to the new final assembly building and existing aft fuselage production, midbody assembly and Dreamlifter operations buildings, Boeing also opened a delivery center at the site in November 2011. The center contains office space and conference rooms to meet with customers buying new planes, along with two jet bridges. A 360,000-square-foot (33,000 m^{2}) two-bay paint facility was added in 2016, allowing Dreamliners to be painted on site, instead of being flown elsewhere.

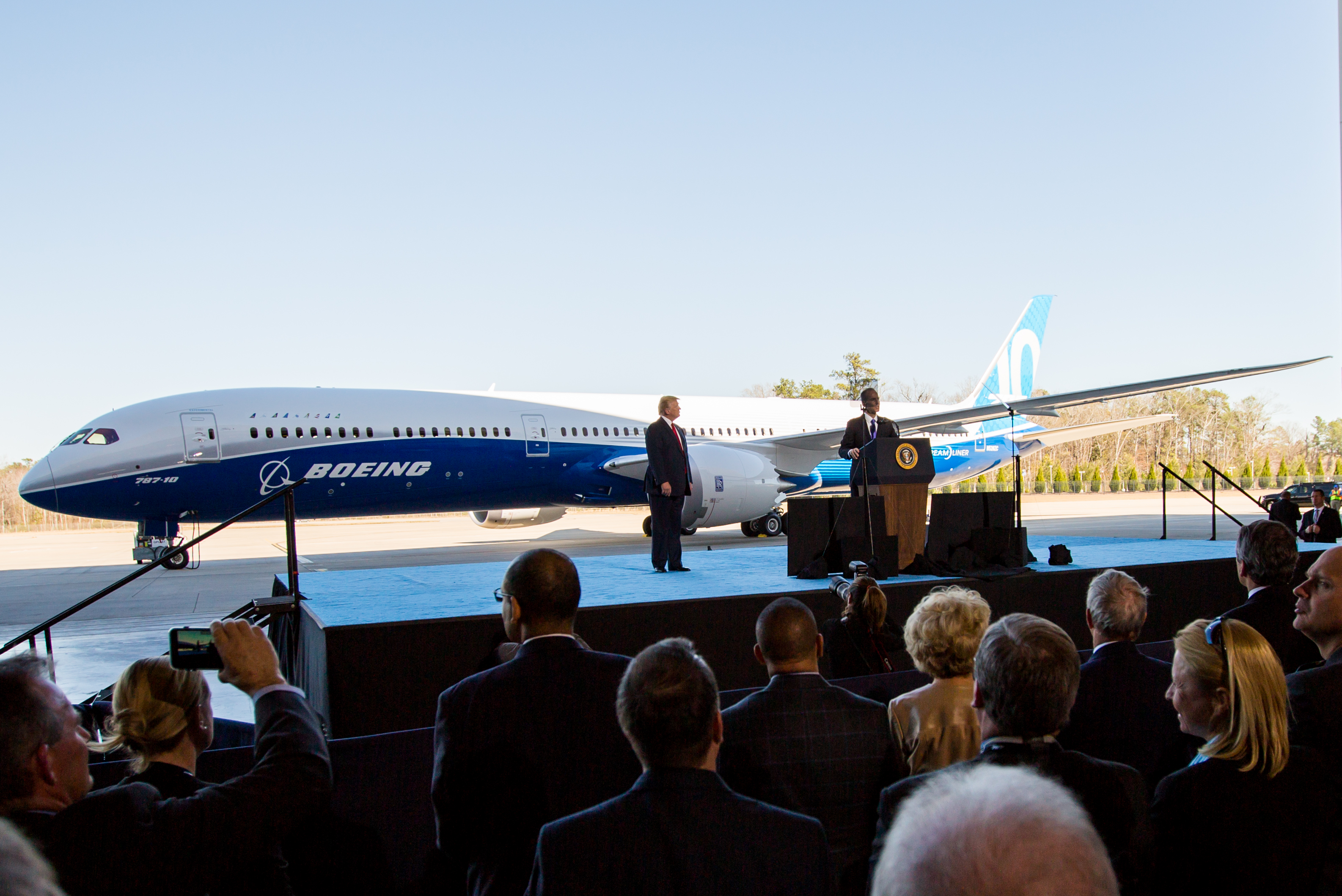
President Donald Trump attending the rollout of the 787-10

The first 787−10 was rolled out on February 17, 2017, and was considered a major achievement for the South Carolina factory, as it would be the first Boeing airliner variant assembled exclusively there. The Everett plant was unable to build the −10 because the mid-fuselage sections are too large to fit inside the Dreamlifter.

Undertaking drastic cost-cutting measures in the wake of the COVID-19 pandemic and its resulting impact on aviation, Boeing announced on October 1, 2020, that it would consolidate all of its 787 assembly at the South Carolina factory. The move was completed in February 2021. A second assembly line at the factory was opened in 2024 and a third is planned to be added in 2028 once a 1.2-million-square-foot (110,000 m^{2}) expansion is completed.

=== Quality-control issues ===
The South Carolina plant has been accused of shoddy production and ignoring safety defects in its airplanes in favor of meeting deadlines.

In 2019, following the discovery of exterior damage on planes manufactured in Charleston, for a time Qatar Airways would only accept delivery of Dreamliners assembled in Everett. Later that same year KLM, which had discovered loose seats, missing and incorrectly installed pins, nuts and bolts not fully tightened and a fuel-line clamp left unsecured on its jet, complained that the standard of manufacture was "way below acceptable standards."

Early in 2020, Boeing engineers discovered depressions in the 787's vertical tail fin, which could lead to structural failure under limited loads, affecting hundreds of planes or the vast majority of the fleet. Eight 787s were grounded due to the issue, which had been discovered in August 2019 at the South Carolina plant, but were delivered to customers anyway. The company received further criticism after it was revealed that Boeing had eliminated 900 quality inspectors at about the same time that they failed to detect or stop the issues.

In September 2020, Boeing admitted that the FAA was investigating quality-control lapses dating back to the introduction of the 787 in 2011 and considering requiring additional inspections for up to 900 of the roughly 1,000 Dreamliners in service. By January 2021, Boeing had halted 787 deliveries to complete the inspection relating to the ongoing quality control issues. The halt was only expected to last a month, but stretched on for more than a year, except for a brief restart between March and May 2021.

Amid the ongoing investigation, the FAA stripped Boeing of its delegated authority to inspect and sign off on 787 aircraft until the company can, "demonstrate consistent quality, stable delivery processes, and a robust plan for the rework needed on the undelivered aircraft in storage." Since the January 2021 stop in deliveries, FAA has rejected several plans from Boeing to address the issues.

As of April 2022, Boeing has not submitted a plan to inspect and repair already constructed planes, indicating a further delay of weeks or months before the resumption of deliveries. The South Carolina plant continues to build planes at a reduced pace of less than two planes a month.

== Local impact ==
The new factory has provided a boost to the local economy in the wake of record-high unemployment rates during the Great Recession, especially in the manufacturing industry. North Charleston mayor Keith Summey called the new factory the "reversal of the shipyard closing," alluding to the 1996 closure of the Charleston Naval Shipyard that took a heavy toll on the local economy. Boeing was offered an incentives package reportedly worth $450 million provided the company create 3,800 jobs and invest $750 million over the next seven years.

Later calculations determined that the state-offered incentives package will be worth in excess of $900 million, when including property and sales tax breaks and state bonds. State lawmakers stood by the deal, insisting that the economic advantages of the package would justify a sizable investment by the state.

In addition to the main 787 production facility at the airport, in 2011 Boeing has also established a 141-acre north campus, about 10 miles away near Ladson, South Carolina. The first building to open was the Interiors Responsibility Center South Carolina where 787 cabin parts are manufactured. The campus expanded in 2014 with the opening of the Boeing Research & Technology Center and Propulsion South Carolina which designs and assembles engine nacelle parts for the 737 MAX and the 777X.
