= Naval Support Activity Charleston =

Base of the United States Navy

- Part of Joint Base Lindsey Graham
- Goose Creek, South Carolina in the United States
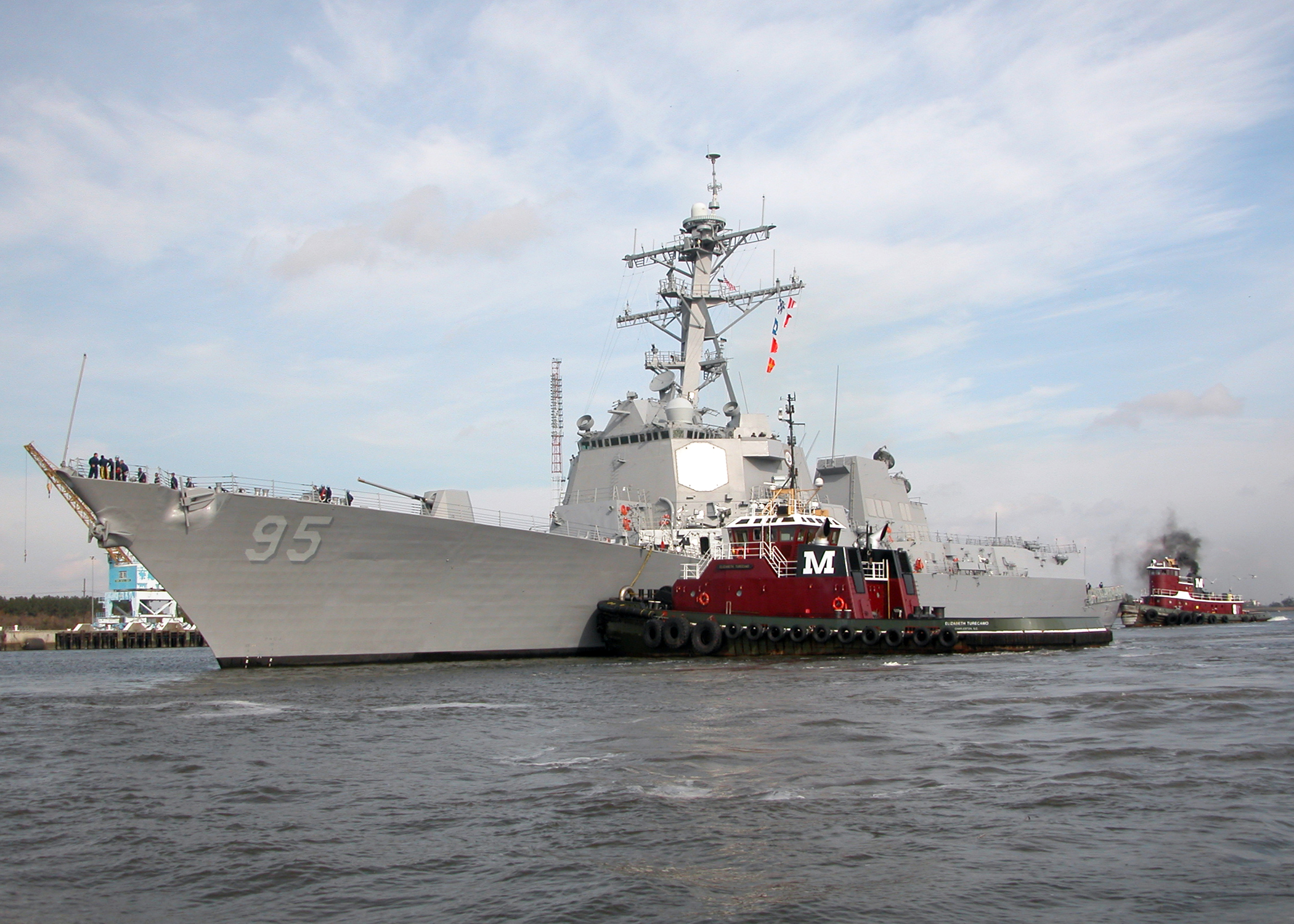
- US Navy guided missile destroyer USS James E. Williams (DDG 95) prepares to moor at Naval Support Activity Charleston

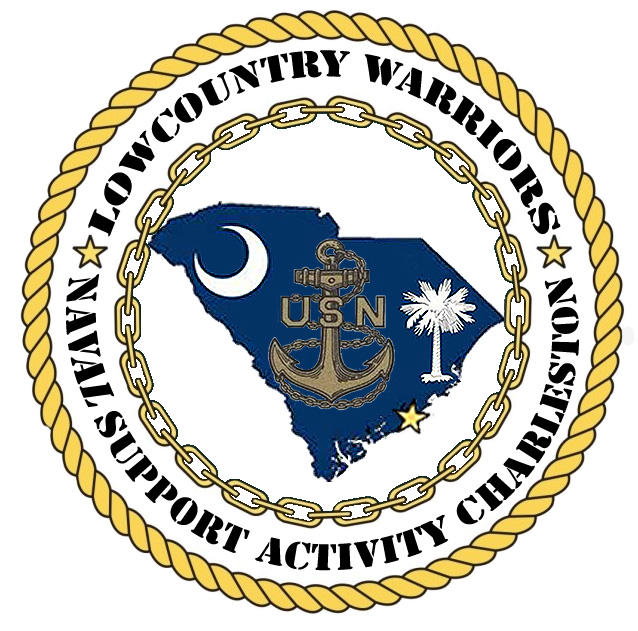

Site information
- Type: Administrative support command
- Owner: Department of Defense
- Operator: US Navy
- Controlled by: Navy Region Southeast
- Condition: Operational
- Website: Official website

Location
- Location within South Carolina Location within the United States
- Coordinates: 32°57′55.8″N 79°58′16.7″W

Site history
- Built: 1941
- In use: 1941–1981 (as US Naval Ammunition Depot); 1981–2009 (as Naval Weapons Station South); 2009 – present (as part of Joint Base)

Garrison information
- Current commander: Captain Andrew G. Peterson III

Naval Support Activity Charleston, originally designated Naval Weapons Station Charleston, is a base of the United States Navy located on the west bank of the Cooper River, in the cities of Goose Creek and Hanahan South Carolina. The base encompasses more than 17,000 acres (69 km^{2}) of land with 10,000 acres (40 km^{2}) of forest and wetlands, 16-plus miles of waterfront, four deep-water piers, 38.2 miles (61.5 km) of railroad and 292 miles (470 km) of road. The current workforce (military/civil service/contractor) numbers more than 11,000 with an additional 3,600 people in on-base family housing.

Of the three Naval Weapons Stations on the U.S. East Coast, the Charleston facility is the largest.

Under the 2005 Base Realignment and Closure Commission's recommendations, the Air Force is to jointly manage Naval Weapons Station Charleston and Charleston Air Force Base as Joint Base Lindsey Graham.

== History ==
Commissioned on November 5, 1941, as the United States Naval Ammunition Depot (NAD) consisted of 6,368 acres this is now the Station's Southside area including the Cooper River waterfront. The facility was used as an ammunition collection and distribution point during World War II. Ammunition manufactured throughout the country was sent to the base and then used to supply ordnance to Atlantic fleet vessels. Following WWII, the Depot was charged with the removal of ordnance from ships being deactivated and was used as a weapons storage site. The NAD's status changed from caretaker to inactive to maintenance to active from 1947 through 1952.

During the mid-1950s, the installation was expanded, the Northside area, another 5,219 acres, was acquired by the Navy in January 1954 and called the Naval Weapons Station Annex and charged with new duties that included the handling of guided missiles and the docking, servicing and loading of submarines. Base personnel were tasked with arming submarines with the UGM-27 Polaris missile.

In 1960 the Polaris Missile Facility Atlantic (POMFLANT) was constructed within the base to enable the handling of Terrier, Tarter, and, Hawk, missiles. Buildings were added again in 1969 for the Standard and Red Eye missiles. The base continued to grow through the 1970s, the Marrington area, an additional 2,894 acres located between Red Bank Road and Foster Creek, was added to the Station. The Navy designated the eastern half as the Marrington Plantation Outdoor Recreation Area and used the western half for the construction of MenRiv Housing and the adjacent support facilities. On September 30, 1981, the Station acquired the nearby Charleston Army Depot. The station's name was then changed to Naval Weapons Station South. In 1995 POMFLANT was decommissioned and the fleet ballistic missile operations moved to Kings Bay, Georgia.

The Naval Nuclear Power Training Command school opened in 1998 and occupies over 50 acres in the central part of the original Marrington tract.

Under the 2005 BRAC the Naval Weapons Station was combined with Charleston Air Force Base to create Joint Base Charleston.

== Current status ==
Map of the southern portion of NSA Charleston

Portions of The Charleston, South Carolina metropolitan area, (The City of Charleston, The City of North Charleston, The City of Goose Creek, and The City of Hanahan) are home to branches of the United States Military. During the Cold War, the Naval Base (1902–1996) became the third largest U.S. homeport serving over 80 ships and submarines. In addition, the Charleston Naval Shipyard repaired frigates, destroyers, cruisers, sub tenders, and submarines. The Shipyard was also equipped for the refueling of nuclear subs.

During this period, the Weapons Station was the Atlantic Fleet's load out base for all "41 for Freedom" nuclear ballistic missile submarines. Two SSBN "Boomer" squadrons and a sub tender were homeported at the Weapons Station, while one SSN attack squadron, Submarine Squadron 4, and a sub tender were homeported at the Naval Base. At the 1996 closure of the Station's Polaris Missile Facility Atlantic (POMFLANT), over 2,500 nuclear warheads and their UGM-27 Polaris, UGM-73 Poseidon, and UGM-96 Trident I delivery missiles (SLBM) were stored and maintained, guarded by a U.S. Marine Corps Security Force Company.

During the 1960s through the early 1990s Submarine Group Six was headquartered in Charleston. Group Six was the largest submarine group in the U.S. Navy, and one of the largest in the world, which included five submarine squadrons in three home ports, five submarine tenders, more than 50 nuclear submarines and more than 18,000 active duty members. Of which 12,000 of the active duty members were home ported in Charleston.

The Naval Support Activity expanded its mission and Department of Defense support role over time with over 40 tenant commands, and today is a training center, with the Naval Nuclear Power Training Command (NNPTC), Nuclear Power Training Unit, Propulsion Facility, and Border Patrol satellite academy; Naval Consolidated Brig, Charleston; Navy Munitions Command Unit Charleston; Explosive Ordnance Detachments; Marine Corps Reserve Center; Naval Information Warfare Center Atlantic (NIWC-LANT, the largest employer in the Charleston area); 269 above-ground ammunition magazines, maintenance and storage of military ordnance including mines, and serves as an Army logistics hub, the busiest continental United States surface port in the defense transportation system. In addition, it contains more than 1,800 on-base houses for Navy enlisted and officer dependents as well as Coast Guard dependents, and has a child care facility, elementary and middle schools. A large medical clinic near NNPTC in Goose Creek was added in 2008.

Today, Joint Base Lindsey Graham, encompassing over 20,877 acres and supporting 53 Military Commands and Federal Agencies, provides service to over 79,000 Airmen, Sailors, Soldiers, Marines, Coast Guardsmen, DOD civilians, dependents, and retirees.

The former Charleston Naval Base has been transformed into a multi-use Federal Complex (231 acres) with 17 government and armed forces tenants, as well as homeport for 6 Roll-On/Roll-Off (RORO) Military Sealift Command Ships, 4 Coast Guard National Security Cutters, and 2 National Oceanic and Atmospheric Administration (NOAA) Research Ships.

NSA Charleston remains a Commander, Navy Installations Command administrative support installation assigned to Commander, Navy Region Southeast, located on the Joint Base Lindsey Graham Naval Weapons Station. NSA Charleston was reorganized as an "Embedded Military Unit" within the Joint Base Lindsey Graham 628th Air Base Wing. NSA Charleston Navy personnel are embedded into the Air Base Wing installation support squadrons to carry out their functions. After the creation of the Joint Base, the NSA Charleston Commanding Officer became the Deputy Commander of the 628th Air Base Wing, responsible to the Wing Commander for base installation support operations.

== Tenants ==
=== Navy ===
- Charleston Naval Weapons Station, Joint Base Lindsey Graham (>17,000 acres, 27 square miles), Goose Creek and Hanahan.
- Naval Information Warfare Center Atlantic (NIWC Atlantic)
- Naval Nuclear Power Training Command
- Nuclear Power School
- Nuclear Power Training Unit

The Navy will be constructing an additional nuclear power simulator at the P200 Nuclear Power Training Facility. The new 280,000 square foot facility is budgeted for $500 million dollars.

  - Moored Training Nuclear Submarine, USS Daniel Webster (SSBN-626)
  - Moored Training Nuclear Submarine, USS La Jolla (SSN-701)
  - Moored Training Nuclear Submarine, USS San Francisco (SSN-711)
- Naval Consolidated Brig, Charleston, East Coast
- Mobile Mine Assembly Unit Eleven (MOMAU-11)
- Naval Operations Support Center Charleston
- Navy Reserve Center
- Navy Munitions Command CONUS, Detachment Charleston
- Explosive Ordnance Detachment
- Naval Health Clinic Charleston
- Navy Dental Clinic
- Naval Criminal Investigative Service Training, Federal Complex
- Lay berth for Roll-On Roll-Off Naval Ships, Military Sealift Command, Federal Complex
- MV Cape Ducato (T-AKR-5051), Military Sealift Command Ship, Ready Reserve Force, Federal Complex
- MV Cape Douglas (T-AKR-5052), Military Sealift Command Ship, Ready Reserve Force, Federal Complex
- MV Cape Domingo (T-AKR-5053), Military Sealift Command Ship, Ready Reserve Force, Federal Complex
- MV Cape Decision (T-AKR-5054), Military Sealift Command Ship, Ready Reserve Force, Federal Complex
- MV Cape Diamond (T-AKR-5055), Military Sealift Command Ship, Ready Reserve Force, Federal Complex
- MV Cape Edmont (T-AKR-5069), Military Sealift Command Ship, Ready Reserve Force, Federal Complex

=== Air Force ===
- Charleston Air Force Base, Joint Base Lindsey Graham (3,877 acres, 6.06 square miles), North Charleston with over 50 C-17 Globemaster Transport Aircraft of the Airlift Wing
- Charleston Air Force Auxiliary Base, North, SC (2,393 acres, 3.74 square miles)
- Charleston Defense Fuel Storage and Distribution Facility, Hanahan
- 628th Air Base Wing
- 628th Mission Support Group
- 628th Medical Group
- 315th Airlift Wing
- 437th Airlift Wing
- 373rd Training Squadron, Detachment 5
- 1st Combat Camera Squadron
- 412th Logistics Support Squadron OL-AC
- Air Force ROTC Det 772
- Civil Air Patrol – Charleston Composite Squadron

=== Marines ===
- Marine Corps Reserve Center, Naval Weapons Station Which now supports 4th Medical Logistics Company

=== Coast Guard ===
In October 2020, the Coast Guard purchased 166 acres on the former Naval complex to construct a super base, so as to consolidate all Charleston area facilities and become the homeport for five Security cutters and five additional offshore cutters. The Base began construction in 2024.

- Coast Guard Sector Charleston (District 7)
- Coast Guard Station Charleston
- Coast Guard Helicopter Air Facility, Johns Island
- Coast Guard Eurocopter HH-65 Dolphin, Johns Island
- Coast Guard Reserves, Charleston
- Coast Guard Maritime Law Enforcement Academy, Federal Complex
- USCGC Hamilton (WMSL-753) National Security Cutter, Federal Complex
- USCGC James (WMSL-754) National Security Cutter, Federal Complex
- USCGC Stone (WMSL-758) National Security Cutter, Federal Complex
- USCGC Calhoun (WMSL-759) National Security Cutter, Federal Complex
- USCGC Friedman (WMSL-760) National Security Cutter, 2024 Delivery, Federal Complex
- USCGC Tarpon, Marine Protector-class coastal patrol boat, Tybee Island
- USCGC Yellowfin, Marine Protector-class coastal patrol boat, Charleston
- USCGC Anvil, 75-foot inland construction tender, Charleston
- USCGC Willow (WLB-202), Charleston

=== Army ===
- United States Army Corps of Engineers, Charleston District
- South Carolina Army National Guard
- Army Reserve Training Center, Naval Weapons Station
- 841st Transportation Battalion, Naval Weapons Station
- 1182d Deployment & Distribution Support Battalion (USAR), Naval Weapons Station
- 1189th Transportation Brigade, Reserve Support Command (USAR), Naval Weapons Station
- Army Strategic Logistics Activity, Naval Weapons Station

=== Federal Complex (former Naval Base Charleston), North Charleston ===
The former NAVBASE Charleston has been transformed into a multi-use Federal Complex (231 acres) with 17 Government and Military tenants, as well as home-port for 6 RO-RO Military Sealift Command Ships, 4 Coast Guard National Security Cutters (NSCs), and 2 NOAA Research Ships. In October 2020, the Coast Guard purchased 166 acres and two piers on the former Naval complex to construct a super base, so as to consolidate all Charleston area facilities and become the home-port for five NSCs and additional Offshore Patrol Cutters (OPCs). The Coast Guard Base began construction in 2024 of the $160 million project to build a new headquarters, renovate of Pier November for Heritage class cutters, and repair a shore-side bulkhead. Additional construction projects valued at $590 million will be forthcoming. In July 2025 solicitations were advertised for the design build of $98 million of additional Coast Guard Base improvements. This will include a guardhouse and visitor center, a medical and dental facility, utility improvements, and road improvements. In 2026 a contract was signed to renovate Pier Mike for home-porting four Offshore Cutters. In July 2026 a $230 million dollar Coast Guard contract was signed to construct a 90,000-square-foot engineering complex, including spaces to accommodate facilities engineering and naval engineering units, electronics support, industrial production, boat storage, shipping and receiving, and hazardous materials storage, Construct a 120,000-square-foot multi functional building to support a 75-room unaccompanied personnel housing structure, a galley large enough to serve 650 patrons, a fitness center, and an exchange and Construct a parking structure to support personnel working on vessels home ported at Base Charleston. Lastly, a $60 million contract was awarded to renovate the NOAA pier and construct shore-side power and warehouse facilities.

- Federal Law Enforcement Training Centers (FLETC), Department of Homeland Security
- Moored FLETC Training Ship, SS Cape Chalmers (T-AK-5036)
- Sea Hawk Inter-agency Operations Center
- Customs and Border Protection Satellite Academy
- Immigration and Customs Enforcement Satellite Academy
- U.S. Courts, Federal Probation and Pretrial Services Academy
- Food and Drug Administration Training Academy
- National Oceanic and Atmospheric Administration (NOAA)
- NOAAS Nancy Foster (R 352) Ship
- NOAAS Ronald H. Brown (R 104) Ship
- U.S. Department of State
- Global Financial Services Center, U.S. Department of State
- Passport Service Center, U.S. Department of State
- United States Maritime Administration
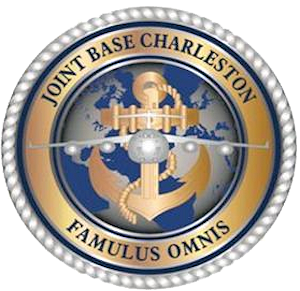
Joint Base Charleston

United States Marine Corps

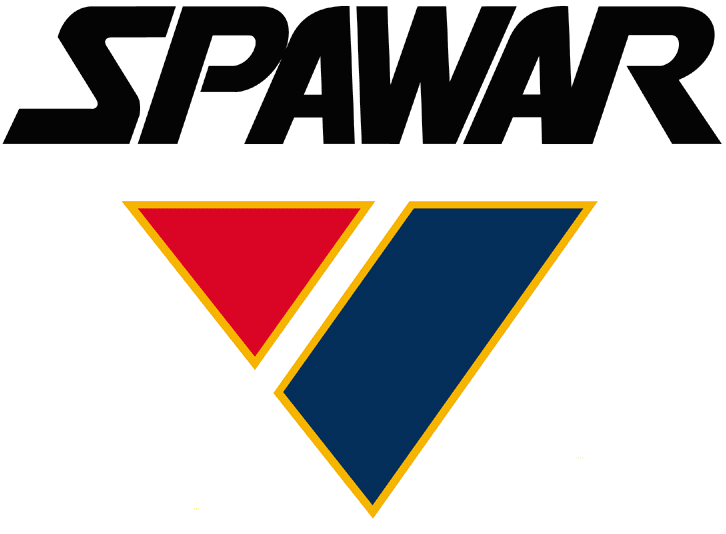
SPAWAR Systems Center Atlantic

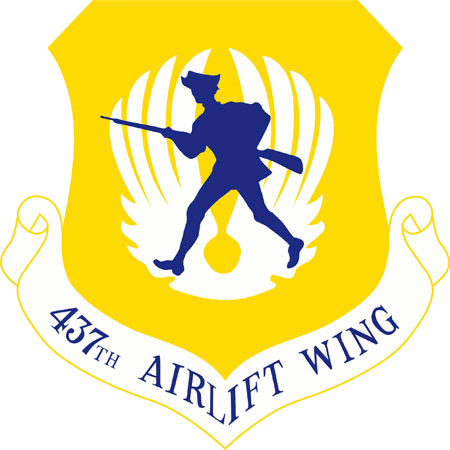
The 437 Airlift Wing

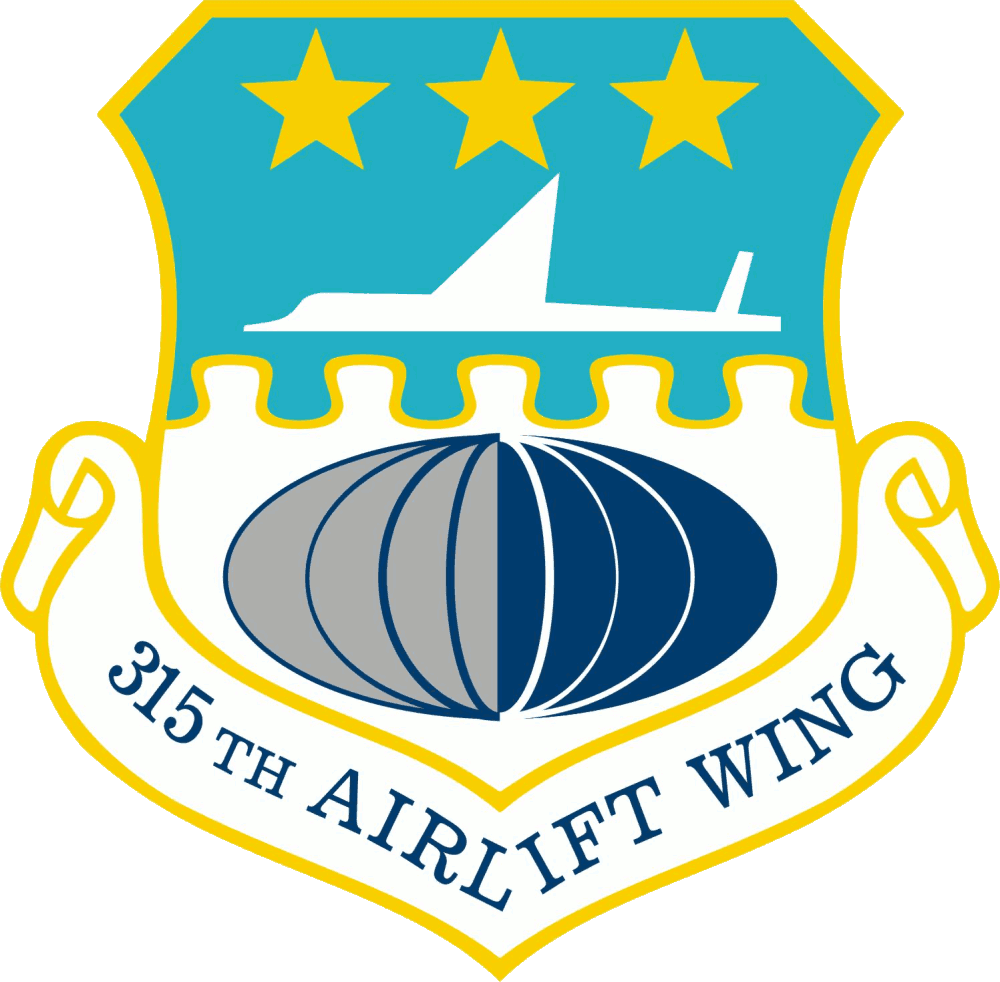
The 315 Airlift Wing

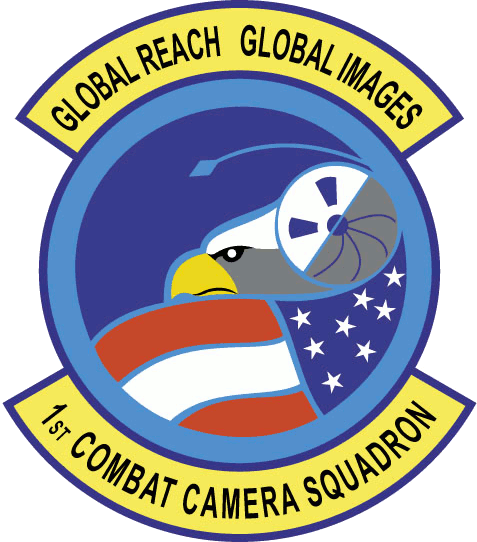
The 1st Combat Camera Squadron

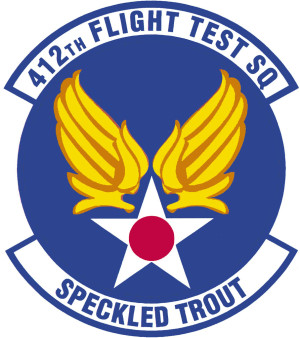
The 412 Flight Test Squadron

U.S. Army Corps of Engineers
