= Charleston metropolitan area, South Carolina =

Charleston Metropolitan Area
- Metropolitan statistical area
- Charleston–North Charleston, SC Metropolitan Statistical Area
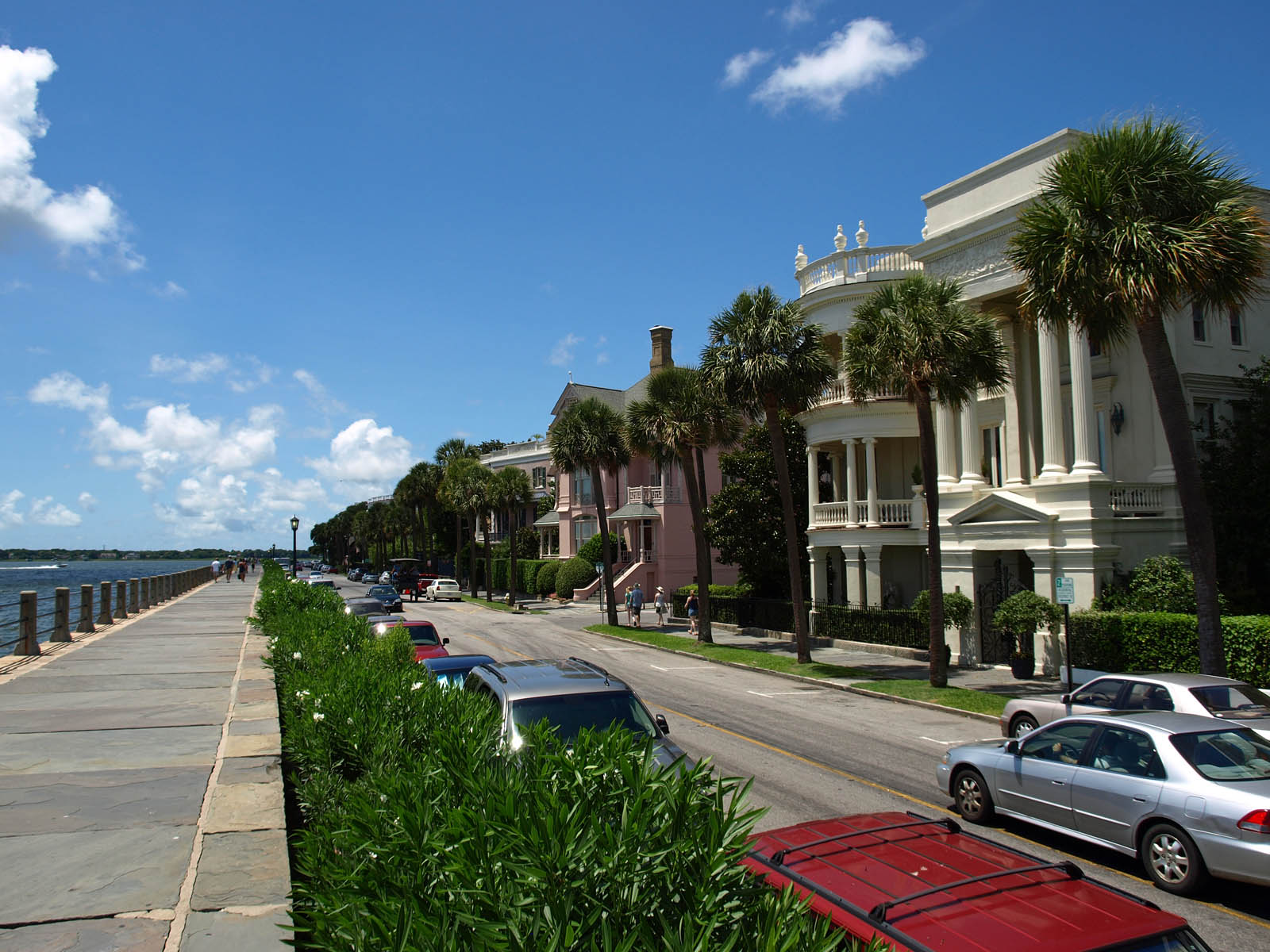
- The Battery in Charleston
Map of Charleston–North Charleston, SC
Metropolitan Statistical Area
City of Charleston
City of North Charleston
Charleston–North Charleston, SC MSA
- Country: United States
- State: South Carolina
- Largest city: Charleston
- Other cities: North Charleston; Mount Pleasant; Summerville; Goose Creek

Area
  - Total: 2,590 sq mi (6,700 km^{2})

Population
  - Total: 799,636
  - Rank: 74th in the U.S.

GDP
  - MSA: $56.933 billion (2022)
- Time zone: UTC−5 (EST)
  - Summer (DST): UTC−4 (EDT)

The Charleston metropolitan area is an urban area centered around Charleston, South Carolina. The U.S. Office of Management and Budget designates the area as the Charleston-North Charleston, SC Metropolitan Statistical Area, a metropolitan statistical area used for statistical purposes only by the United States Census Bureau and other federal agencies. The OMB defines the area as comprising Berkeley, Charleston and Dorchester counties, an area with 799,636 residents in the 2020 census. Principal cities include Charleston, North Charleston, and Summerville. The area is commonly referred to as the Tri-County Area or the Lowcountry, though the latter term has historically referred to South Carolina's southern coast in general.

== Area ==
Historical population
| Census | Pop. | Note | %± |
|---|---|---|---|
| 1900 | 80,006 | | — |
| 1910 | 88,594 | | 10.7% |
| 1920 | 108,450 | | 22.4% |
| 1930 | 101,050 | | −6.8% |
| 1940 | 121,105 | | 19.8% |
| 1950 | 164,856 | | 36.1% |
| 1960 | 278,961 | | 69.2% |
| 1970 | 336,125 | | 20.5% |
| 1980 | 430,462 | | 28.1% |
| 1990 | 506,875 | | 17.8% |
| 2000 | 549,033 | | 8.3% |
| 2010 | 664,607 | | 21.1% |
| 2020 | 799,636 | | 20.3% |
| 2022 (est.) | 830,529 | | 3.9% |
U.S. Decennial Census

=== Counties ===
| County | Seat | 2025 estimate | 2020 Census | Change | Area | Density |
|---|---|---|---|---|---|---|
| Charleston | Charleston | 436,200 | 408,235 | +6.85% | 1,358 sq mi (3,520 km^{2}) | 321/sq mi (124/km^{2}) |
| Berkeley | Moncks Corner | 274,666 | 229,861 | +19.49% | 1,234 sq mi (3,200 km^{2}) | 223/sq mi (86/km^{2}) |
| Dorchester | St. George | 178,397 | 161,540 | +10.44% | 571 sq mi (1,480 km^{2}) | 312/sq mi (121/km^{2}) |
| Total | | 889,263 | 799,636 | +11.21% | 3,163 sq mi (8,190 km^{2}) | 281/sq mi (109/km^{2}) |

=== Largest cities and towns ===
The Charleston Metropolitan Area has become one of the fastest-growing regions in the state of South Carolina. This tri-county area includes Berkeley, Charleston, and Dorchester counties with an estimated population of approximately 869,940 residents and has been ranked in the top 10% fastest growing regions. Due to migration, more job opportunities, and significant suburban development, this area has grown to become a major population and economic hub in South Carolina.

| Rank | City / town | County | 2020 Census | 2010 Census | Change |
|---|---|---|---|---|---|
| 1 | Charleston | Charleston County / Berkeley County | 150,227 | 128,563 | +16.85% |
| 2 | North Charleston | Berkeley County / Charleston County / Dorchester County | 114,852 | 97,471 | +17.83% |
| 3 | Mount Pleasant | Charleston County | 90,801 | 67,843 | +33.84% |
| 4 | Summerville | Dorchester County / Berkeley County / Charleston County | 50,915 | 43,392 | +17.34% |
| 5 | Goose Creek | Berkeley County | 45,946 | 35,938 | +27.85% |
| 6 | Hanahan | Berkeley County | 20,325 | 17,997 | +12.94% |
| 7 | Moncks Corner | Berkeley County | 13,297 | 7,885 | +68.64% |
| 8 | James Island | Charleston County | 11,621 | 11,231 | +3.47% |
| 9 | Hollywood | Charleston County | 5,339 | 4,714 | +13.26% |
| 10 | Isle of Palms | Charleston County | 4,347 | 4,133 | +5.18% |

== Communities ==
=== Places with more than 100,000 inhabitants ===
- Charleston (Principal city / County Seat)
- North Charleston (Principal city)

=== Places with 25,000 to 100,000 inhabitants ===
- Goose Creek
- Mount Pleasant
- Summerville

=== Places with 5,000 to 25,000 inhabitants ===
- Hanahan
- James Island
- Johns Island
- Ladson (census-designated place)
- Moncks Corner (County Seat)
- Hollywood
- Sangaree (census-designated place)

=== Places with 1,000 to 5,000 inhabitants ===
- Awendaw
- Folly Beach
- Isle of Palms
- Kiawah Island
- Lincolnville
- Meggett
- Ravenel
- Ridgeville
- Seabrook Island
- St. George (County Seat)
- St. Stephen
- Sullivan's Island

=== Places with fewer than 1,000 inhabitants ===
- Bonneau
- Harleyville
- Jamestown
- McClellanville
- Reevesville
- Rockville

=== Unincorporated places ===
- Cross
- Gumville
- Huger
- Pineville
- Wadmalaw Island

== Demographics ==
As of the census of 2000, there were 549,033 people, 227,957 households, and 161,448 families residing within the MSA. The racial makeup of the MSA was 65.10% White, 30.80% African American, 0.41% Native American, 1.32% Asian, 0.06% Pacific Islander, 0.98% from other races, and 1.34% from two or more races. Hispanic or Latino of any race were 2.38% of the population.

The median income for a household in the MSA was $40,345, and the median income for a family was $47,186. Males had a median income of $33,229 versus $24,118 for females. The per capita income for the MSA was $19,037.

== Armed Forces ==
Portions of the Charleston, South Carolina metropolitan area (The City of Charleston, The City of North Charleston, The City of Goose Creek, and The City of Hanahan) are home to all branches of the United States Military. During the Cold War, the Naval Base (1902-1996) became the third largest U.S. homeport serving over 80 ships and submarines. In addition, the Charleston Naval Shipyard repaired frigates, destroyers, cruisers, sub tenders, and submarines. Also, the Shipyard was responsible for refueling nuclear subs.

During this period, the Weapons Station was the Atlantic Fleet's load out base for all nuclear ballistic missile submarines. Two SSBN "Boomer" squadrons and a sub tender were homeported at the Weapons Station, while one SSN attack squadron, Submarine Squadron 4, and a sub tender were homeported at the Naval Base. At the 1996 closure of the Station's Polaris Missile Facility Atlantic (POMFLANT), over 2,500 nuclear warheads and their UGM-27 Polaris, UGM-73 Poseidon, and UGM-96 Trident I delivery missiles (SLBM) were stored and maintained, guarded by a U.S. Marine Corps Security Force Company.

In 2010, the Air Force Base (3,877 acres) and Naval Weapons Station (>17,000 acres) merged to form Joint Base Charleston. Today, Joint Base Charleston, encompassing over 20,877 acres and supporting 53 Military Commands and Federal Agencies, provides service to over 79,000 Airmen, Sailors, Soldiers, Marines, Coast Guardsmen, DOD civilians, dependents, and retirees.

=== Navy ===
- Charleston Naval Weapons Station, Joint Base Charleston (>17,000 acres, 27 square miles), Goose Creek and Hanahan
- Naval Information Warfare Center Atlantic (NAVWAR)
- Naval Nuclear Power Training Command
- Nuclear Power School
- Nuclear Power Training Unit
- Moored Training Nuclear Submarine, USS Daniel Webster (SSBN-626)
- Moored Training Nuclear Submarine, USS La Jolla (SSN-701)
- Moored Training Nuclear Submarine, USS San Francisco (SSN-711)
- Naval Consolidated Brig, Charleston, East Coast
- Mobile Mine Assembly Unit Eleven (MOMAU-11)
- Naval Operations Support Center Charleston
- Navy Reserve Center
- Navy Munitions Command CONUS, Detachment Charleston
- Explosive Ordnance Detachment
- Naval Health Clinic Charleston
- Navy Dental Clinic
- Naval Criminal Investigative Service Training, Federal Complex
- Lay berth for Roll-On Roll-Off Naval Ships, Military Sealift Command, Federal Complex
- MV Cape Ducato (T-AKR-5051), Military Sealift Command Ship, Ready Reserve Force, Federal Complex
- MV Cape Douglas (T-AKR-5052), Military Sealift Command Ship, Ready Reserve Force, Federal Complex
- MV Cape Domingo (T-AKR-5053), Military Sealift Command Ship, Ready Reserve Force, Federal Complex
- MV Cape Decision (T-AKR-5054), Military Sealift Command Ship, Ready Reserve Force, Federal Complex
- MV Cape Diamond (T-AKR-5055), Military Sealift Command Ship, Ready Reserve Force, Federal Complex
- MV Cape Edmont (T-AKR-5069), Military Sealift Command Ship, Ready Reserve Force, Federal Complex

=== Air Force ===
- Charleston Air Force Base, Joint Base Charleston (3,877 acres, 6.06 square miles), North Charleston
- Charleston Air Force Auxiliary Base, North, SC (2,393 acres, 3.74 square miles)
- Charleston Defense Fuel Storage and Distribution Facility, Hanahan
- 628th Air Base Wing
- 628th Mission Support Group
- 628th Medical Group
- 315th Airlift Wing
- 437th Airlift Wing
- 373rd Training Squadron, Detachment 5
- 1st Combat Camera Squadron
- 412th Logistics Support Squadron OL-AC
- Air Force ROTC Det 772
- Civil Air Patrol – Charleston Composite Squadron

=== Marines ===
- Marine Corps Reserve Center, Naval Weapons Station

=== Coast Guard ===
- Coast Guard Sector Charleston (District 7)
- Coast Guard Station Charleston
- Coast Guard Base Charleston
- Coast Guard Helicopter Air Facility, Johns Island
- Coast Guard Eurocopter HH-65 Dolphin, Johns Island
- Coast Guard Reserves, Charleston
- Coast Guard Maritime Law Enforcement Academy, Federal Complex
- USCGC Hamilton (WMSL-753) National Security Cutter, Federal Complex
- USCGC James (WMSL-754) National Security Cutter, Federal Complex
- USCGC Stone (WMSL-758 National security cutter, Federal Complex
- USCGC Tarpon, Marine Protector-class coastal patrol boat, Tybee Island
- USCGC Yellowfin, Marine Protector-class coastal patrol boat, Charleston
- USCGC Anvil, Charleston

=== Army ===
- United States Army Corps of Engineers, Charleston District
- South Carolina Army National Guard
- Army Reserve Training Center, Naval Weapons Station
- 841st Army Transportation Battalion, Naval Weapons Station
- 1182nd Army Deployment & Distribution Support Battalion, Naval Weapons Station
- 1189th Army Transportation Brigade, Reserve Support Command, Naval Weapons Station
- Army Strategic Logistics Activity, Naval Weapons Station

=== Federal Complex (former Charleston Naval Base), North Charleston ===
- Federal Law Enforcement Training Centers (FLETC), Department of Homeland Security
- Moored FLETC Training Ship, SS Cape Chalmers (T-AK-5036)
- Sea Hawk Interagency Operations Center
- Customs and Border Protection Satellite Academy
- Immigration and Customs Enforcement Satellite Academy
- U.S. Courts, Federal Probation and Pretrial Services Academy
- Food and Drug Administration Training Academy
- National Oceanic and Atmospheric Administration (NOAA)
- NOAAS Nancy Foster (R 352) Ship
- NOAAS Ronald H. Brown (R 104) Ship
- U.S. Department of State
- Global Financial Services Center, U.S. Department of State

L*Passport Service Center, U.S. Department of State

- United States Maritime Administration
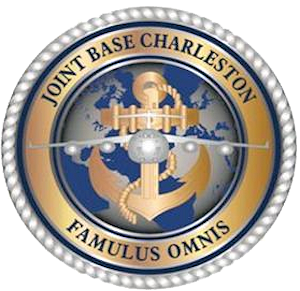
Joint Base Charleston

United States Marine Corps

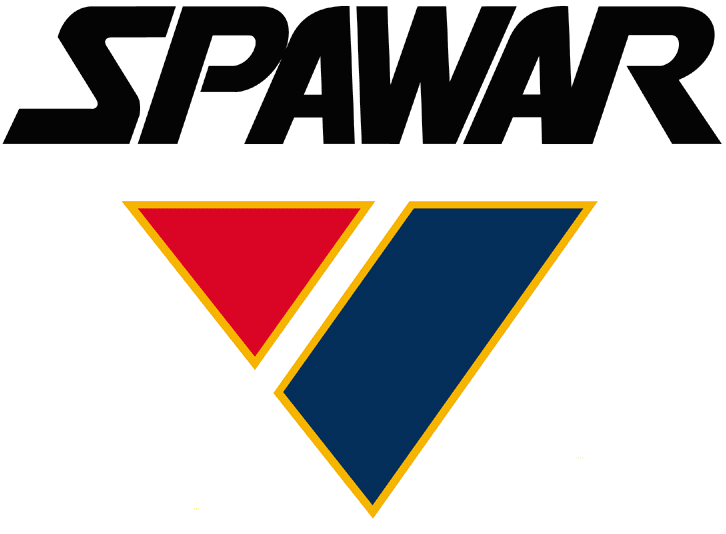
SPAWAR Systems Center Atlantic

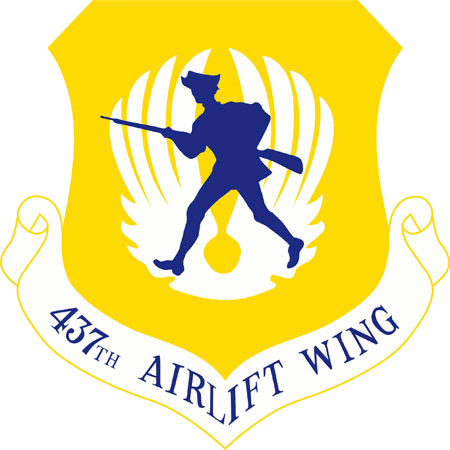
The 437 Airlift Wing

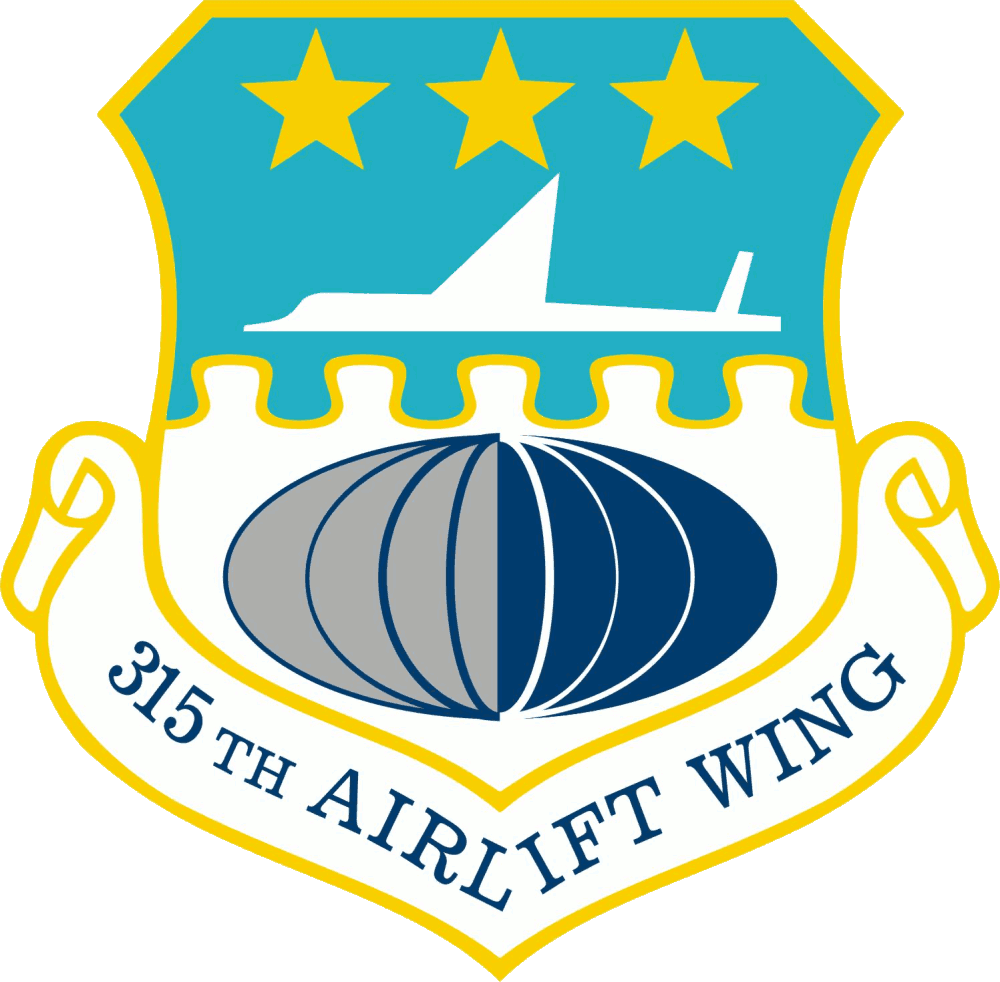
The 315 Airlift Wing

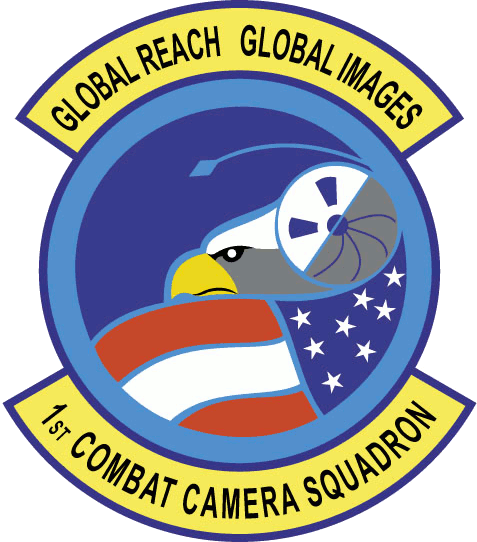
The 1st Combat Camera Squadron

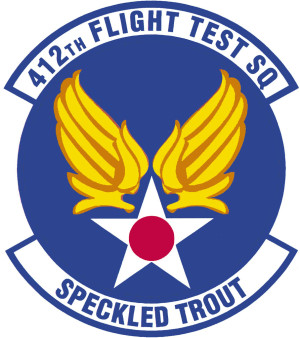
The 412 Flight Test Squadron

U.S. Army Corps of Engineers

== See also ==
- South Carolina census statistical areas
