= Joint Base Charleston =

US Armed Forces facility in South Carolina

Joint Base Lindsey Graham
- Near North Charleston and Goose Creek, South Carolina in the United States of America
- US Air Force C-17 Globemaster III aircraft assigned to the 437th Airlift Wing sit on the flight line at Joint Base Lindsey Graham (then named Joint Base Charleston) during 2013.

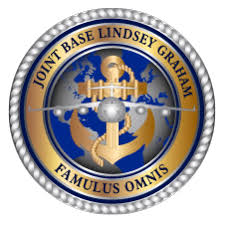
- Motto Famulus Omnis (Latin for 'Serving All')

Site information
- Type: US military Joint Base
- Owner: Department of Defense
- Operator: US Air Force
- Controlled by: Air Mobility Command
- Condition: Operational
- Website: www.jbcharleston.jb.mil

Location
- Location within South Carolina Location within the United States
- Coordinates: 32°53′55″N 080°02′26″W (Air Base); 32°57′55.8″N 79°58′16.7″W (Naval Weapons Station)

Site history
- Built: 1942 (as Charleston Air Force Base)
- In use: 2009 – present (as Joint Base)

Garrison information
- Current commander: Colonel Jason Parker
- Garrison: 628th Air Base Wing (host)

Airfield information
- Identifiers: IATA: CHS, ICAO: KCHS, FAA LID: CHS, WMO: 722083
- Elevation: 46 metres (151 ft) AMSL
Runways
Direction	Length and surface
15/33	2,743.5 metres (9,001 ft) Concrete
03/21	2,133.6 metres (7,000 ft) Concrete
- Airfield shared with Charleston International Airport; Source: Federal Aviation Administration

Joint Base Lindsey Graham, formerly known as Joint Base Charleston (IATA: CHS, ICAO: KCHS, FAA LID: CHS) is a United States military facility located partly in the city of North Charleston, South Carolina, and partly in the city of Goose Creek, South Carolina. The facility is under the jurisdiction of the United States Air Force's 628th Air Base Wing of the Air Mobility Command (AMC). The facility is named after former senator Lindsey Graham, whom it was renamed after on August 10, 2026, following Graham’s death on July 11. The facility is an amalgamation of the United States Air Force's Charleston Air Force Base and the United States Navy's Naval Support Activity Charleston which were merged on October 1, 2010. Of the three Naval Weapons Stations on the U.S. East Coast, the Charleston facility is the largest.

A joint civil-military airport, Joint Base Lindsey Graham shares runways with Charleston International Airport for commercial airline operations on the south side of the airfield and general aviation aircraft operations on the east side.

== History ==
Joint Base Lindsey Graham was established as Joint Base Charleston in accordance with congressional legislation, implementing the recommendations of the 2005 Base Realignment and Closure Commission. The legislation ordered the consolidation of adjoining military installations into a single joint base, there being 12 joint bases established under the law.

Today, Joint Base Lindsey Graham, covering nearly 23,000 acres (9,300 ha), supports 67 military organizations and Federal Agencies and provides services to more than 90,000 airmen, sailors, soldiers, Marines, coast guardsmen, Department of Defense (DoD) civilians, dependents, and retirees.

A 21 December 2009, an Air Force Times article announced the activation of the 628th Air Base Wing (628 ABW) to "take over administrative duties for a number of military commands" in January 2010. The 628th "will essentially serve as the 'landlord' for Charleston Air Force Base, the Charleston Naval Consolidated Brig and about 50 other military commands. The unit will handle items such as building and grounds services, supply and civil engineering and public works." On 8 January 2010, the (628 ABW) achieved its initial operating capability (IOC). The wing maintains $2 billion worth of physical infrastructure on the base. Additionally, the wing also provides mission-ready expeditionary airmen to combatant commanders in support of joint and combined operations. The 628 ABW attained full operating capability (FOC) on 1 October 2010.

On 27 July 2026, it was revealed in an internal memo that as part of a plan to honor Senator Lindsey Graham, who died on July 11, The Pentagon had directed the Air Force to rename the base to Joint Base Lindsey Graham.

== Role and operations ==
=== US Air Force ===
The 628th Air Base Wing (628 ABW) is the host wing for installation support. The 628 ABW's primary duties are to provide installation support to 53 DoD and Federal agencies, attendant personnel, dependents, and retirees on Charleston Air Force Base and Naval Weapons Station Charleston (NWS Charleston). Additionally, the 628 ABW also provides expeditionary airmen to combatant commanders in support of joint and combined operations.

The 437th Airlift Wing (437 AW) operates the C-17 Globemaster III strategic airlift aircraft in support of its mission to provide airlift of troops and passengers, military equipment, cargo, and aeromedical equipment and supplies worldwide in accordance with tasking by Air Mobility Command and unified combatant commanders.

The air base has four operational groups consisting of 21 squadrons and two wing staff directorates. It is augmented by a parallel, collocated Air Force Reserve Command (AFRC) "associate" wing, the 315th Airlift Wing (315 AW), which shares the same C-17 aircraft with the 437 AW. In addition, the USAF Auxiliary Civil Air Patrol Coastal Charleston Composite Squadron is also assigned to Joint Base Lindsey Graham. They meet in Building 247.

New construction allows larger and heavier aircraft to land on runway 03/21 at Charleston International Airport, which was key when work was scheduled for Fiscal Year 2012 began on runway 15/33, the base's main runway. The last previous major work done on the base's runways was in 1968.

=== US Navy ===
Portions of the Charleston metropolitan area (including the city of Charleston, North Charleston, Goose Creek, and Hanahan) are home to branches of the U.S. Military. During the Cold War, the Naval Base (1902–1996) became the third largest U.S. home port, serving over 80 ships and submarines. In addition, the shipyard repaired frigates, destroyers, cruisers, sub tenders, and submarines. It was also equipped for the refueling of nuclear submarines.

During this period, the Weapons Station was the Atlantic Fleet's load-out base for all 41 nuclear ballistic missile submarines. Two SSBN "Boomer" squadrons and a sub tender were homeported at the Weapons Station, while one SSN attack squadron, Submarine Squadron 4, and a sub tender were homeported at the Naval Base. At the 1996 closure of the Station's Polaris Missile Facility Atlantic (POMFLANT), over 2,500 nuclear warheads and their UGM-27 Polaris, UGM-73 Poseidon, and UGM-96 Trident I delivery missiles (SLBM) were stored and maintained, guarded by a U.S. Marine Corps Security Force Company. From the 1960s through the early 1990s, Submarine Group Six was headquartered in Charleston. Being the largest submarine group in the U.S. Navy and one of the largest in the world, it included five submarine squadrons in three home ports with five submarine tenders, more than 50 submarines, and over 18,000 active-duty members, of which 12,000 were homeported in Charleston.

The Naval Support Activity has expanded its mission and Department of Defense support role with over 40 tenant commands, and today is a training center, with the Naval Nuclear Power Training Command (NNPTC), Nuclear Power Training Unit, Propulsion Facility, and Border Patrol satellite academy; Naval Consolidated Brig, Charleston; Mobile Mine Assembly Unit; Explosive Ordnance Detachments; Marine Corps Reserve Center; an engineering complex, with the Naval Information Warfare Center Atlantic (NIWC, this is the largest employer in the Charleston area) and is close to the Naval Facilities Engineering Command Southeast; 269 above-ground ammunition magazines; maintenance and storage of military ordnance, including mines; and serves as an Army logistics hub, the busiest continental United States surface port in the defense transportation system. In addition, NWS Charleston contains more than 1,800 on-base houses for Navy enlisted and officer dependents, as well as Coast Guard dependents. It also has a child care facility, elementary school, and middle school. A large medical clinic, near NNPTC in Goose Creek, finished construction in 2008.

== Based units ==
=== Navy ===
- Charleston Naval Weapons Station, Joint Base Charleston (>17,000 acres, 27 square miles), Goose Creek and Hanahan
- Naval Information Warfare Center Atlantic (NIWC Atlantic)
- Naval Nuclear Power Training Command
  - Nuclear Power School
- Nuclear Power Training Unit

The Navy will be constructing an additional nuclear power simulator at the P200 Nuclear Power Training Facility. The new 280,000 square foot facility is budgeted for $500 million dollars.

  - Moored Training Nuclear Submarine, USS Daniel Webster (SSBN-626)
  - Moored Training Nuclear Submarine, USS Sam Rayburn (SSBN-635)
  - Moored Training Nuclear Submarine, USS La Jolla (SSN-701)
  - Moored Training Nuclear Submarine, USS San Francisco (SSN-711)
- Naval Consolidated Brig, Charleston, East Coast
- Mobile Mine Assembly Unit Eleven (MOMAU-11)
- Naval Operations Support Center Charleston
- Navy Reserve Center
- Navy Munitions Command CONUS, Detachment Charleston
- Explosive Ordnance Detachment
- Naval Health Clinic Charleston
- Navy Dental Clinic
- Naval Criminal Investigative Service Training, Federal Complex
- Lay berth for Roll-On Roll-Off Surge Sealift Ships, Ready Reserve Force, Federal Complex
- MV Cape Ducato (T-AKR-5051), Maritime Administration RRF Vessel, Federal Complex
- MV Cape Douglas (T-AKR-5052), Maritime Administration RRF Vessel, Federal Complex
- MV Cape Domingo (T-AKR-5053), Maritime Administration, RRF Vessel, Federal Complex
- MV Cape Decision (T-AKR-5054), Maritime Administration RRF Vessel, Federal Complex
- MV Cape Diamond (T-AKR-5055), Maritime Administration RRF Vessel, Federal Complex
- MV Cape Edmont (T-AKR-5069), Maritime Administration RRF Vessel, Federal Complex

=== Air Force ===
- Charleston Air Force Base, Joint Base Lindsey Graham (3,877 acres, 6.06 square miles), North Charleston with over 50 C-17 Globemaster Transport Aircraft of the Airlift Wing
- Charleston Air Force Auxiliary Base, North, SC (2,393 acres, 3.74 square miles)
- Charleston Defense Fuel Storage and Distribution Facility, Hanahan
- 628th Air Base Wing
- 628th Mission Support Group
- 628th Medical Group
- 628th Communications Squadron
- 315th Airlift Wing
- 437th Airlift Wing
- 373rd Training Squadron, Detachment 5
- 1st Combat Camera Squadron
- 4th Combat Camera Squadron
- 412th Logistics Support Squadron OL-AC
- Air Force ROTC Det 772
- Civil Air Patrol – Charleston Composite Squadron

=== Coast Guard ===
- Coast Guard Sector Charleston (District 7)
- Coast Guard Station Charleston
- Coast Guard Helicopter Air Facility, Johns Island
- Coast Guard Eurocopter HH-65 Dolphin, Johns Island
- Coast Guard Reserves, Charleston
- Coast Guard Maritime Law Enforcement Academy, Federal Complex
- USCGC Hamilton (WMSL-753) National Security Cutter, Federal Complex
- USCGC James (WMSL-754) National Security Cutter, Federal Complex
- USCGC Stone (WMSL-758) National Security Cutter, Federal Complex
- USCGC Calhoun (WMSL-759) National Security Cutter, Federal Complex
- USCGC Friedman (WMSL-760) National Security Cutter, 2024 Delivery, Federal Complex
- USCGC Tarpon, Marine Protector-class coastal patrol boat, Tybee Island
- USCGC Yellowfin, Marine Protector-class coastal patrol boat, Charleston
- USCGC Anvil, Charleston

=== Army ===
- United States Army Corps of Engineers, Charleston District
- South Carolina Army National Guard
- Army Reserve Training Center, Naval Weapons Station
- 841st Army Transportation Battalion, Naval Weapons Station
- 1182nd Army Deployment & Distribution Support Battalion, Naval Weapons Station
- 1189th Army Transportation Brigade, Reserve Support Command, Naval Weapons Station
- Army Strategic Logistics Activity, Naval Weapons Station

=== Marines ===
- Marine Corps Reserve Center, Naval Weapons Station Which now supports 4th Medical Logistics Company

=== Federal complex (former Charleston Naval Base), North Charleston ===
The former NAVBASE Charleston has been transformed into a multi-use federal complex (231 acres) with 17 government and military tenants, as well as home-port for 6 RO-RO Military Sealift Command ships, 4 Coast Guard National Security Cutters (NSCs), and 2 NOAA Research Ships. In October 2020, the Coast Guard purchased 166 acres and two piers on the former naval complex to construct a super base, so as to consolidate all Charleston area facilities and become the home-port for five NSCs and additional Offshore Patrol Cutters (OPCs). Construction of the Coast Guard base began in 2024 for the $160 million project to build a new headquarters, renovate Pier November for Heritage class cutters, and repair a shore-side bulkhead. Additional construction projects valued at $590 million will be forthcoming. In July 2025 solicitations were advertised for the design build of $98 million of additional Coast Guard base improvements. This will include a guardhouse and visitor center, a medical and dental facility, utility improvements, and road improvements. In 2026 a contract was signed to renovate Pier Mike for home-porting four Offshore Cutters. In July 2026 a $230 million dollar Coast Guard contract was signed to construct a 90,000-square-foot engineering complex, including spaces to accommodate facilities engineering and naval engineering units, electronics support, industrial production, boat storage, shipping and receiving, and hazardous materials storage, Construct a 120,000-square-foot multi functional building to support a 75-room unaccompanied personnel housing structure, a galley large enough to serve 650 patrons, a fitness center, and an exchange and Construct a parking structure to support personnel working on vessels home ported at Base Charleston. Lastly, a $60 million contract was awarded to renovate the NOAA pier and construct shore-side power and warehouse facilities.

- Federal Law Enforcement Training Centers (FLETC), Department of Homeland Security
- NOAA Corps
- Moored FLETC Training Ship, SS Cape Chalmers (T-AK-5036)
- Sea Hawk Interagency Operations Center
- Customs and Border Protection Satellite Academy
- Immigration and Customs Enforcement Satellite Academy
- U.S. Courts, Federal Probation and Pretrial Services Academy
- Food and Drug Administration Training Academy
- National Oceanic and Atmospheric Administration (NOAA)
- National Oceanic and Atmospheric Administration Fisheries Office of Law Enforcement
- NOAAS Nancy Foster (R 352) ship
- NOAAS Ronald H. Brown (R 104) ship
- U.S. Department of State
- Veterans Administration Goose Creek Clinic
- Global Financial Services Center, U.S. Department of State
- Passport Service Center, U.S. Department of State
- United States Maritime Administration
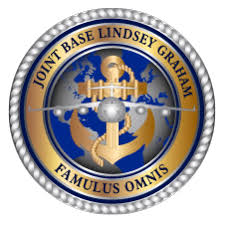
Joint Base Lindsey Graham

United States Marine Corps

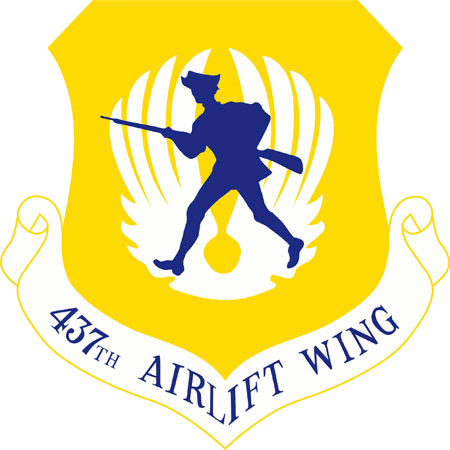
The 437 Airlift Wing

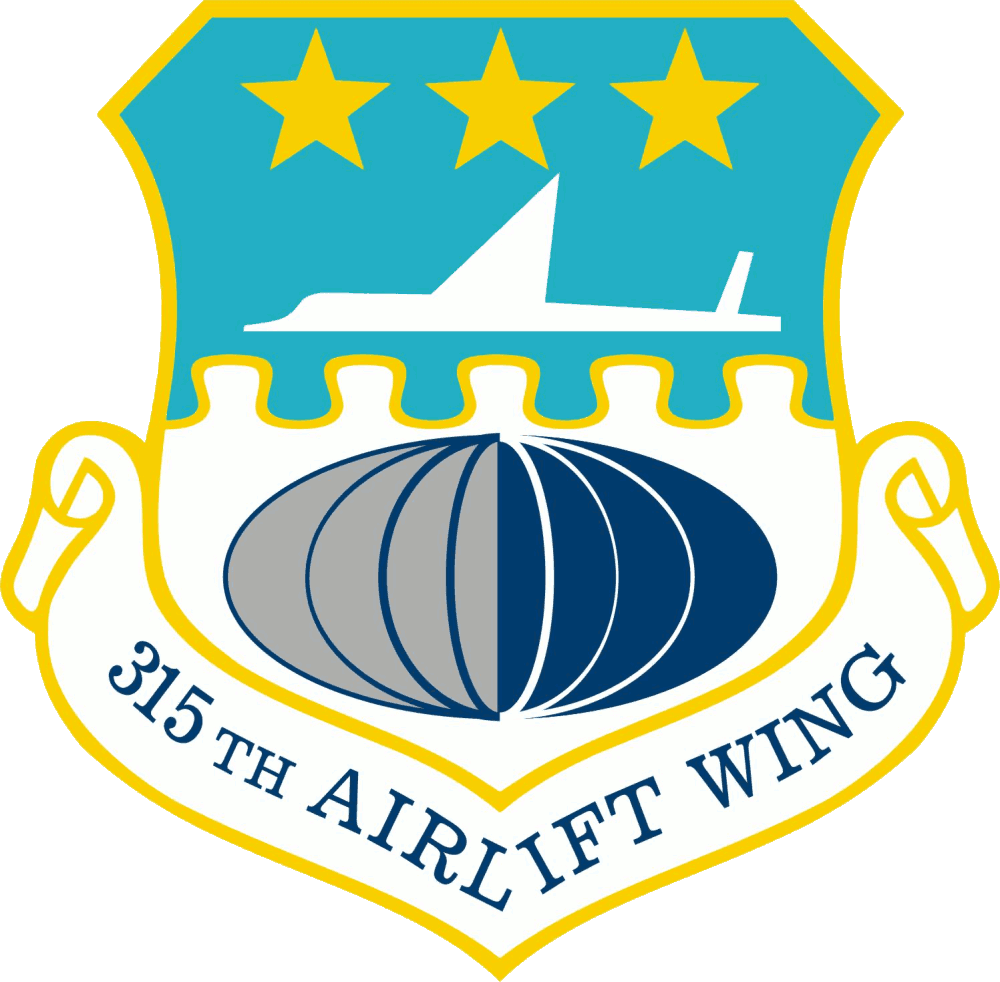
The 315 Airlift Wing

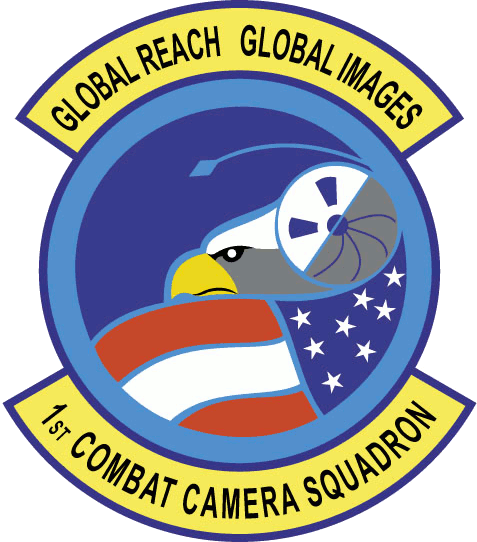
The 1st Combat Camera Squadron

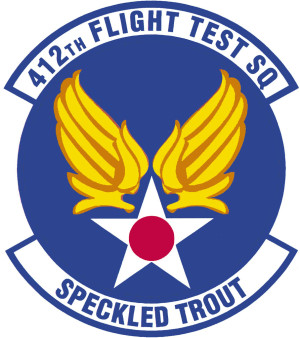
The 412 Flight Test Squadron

U.S. Army Corps of Engineers

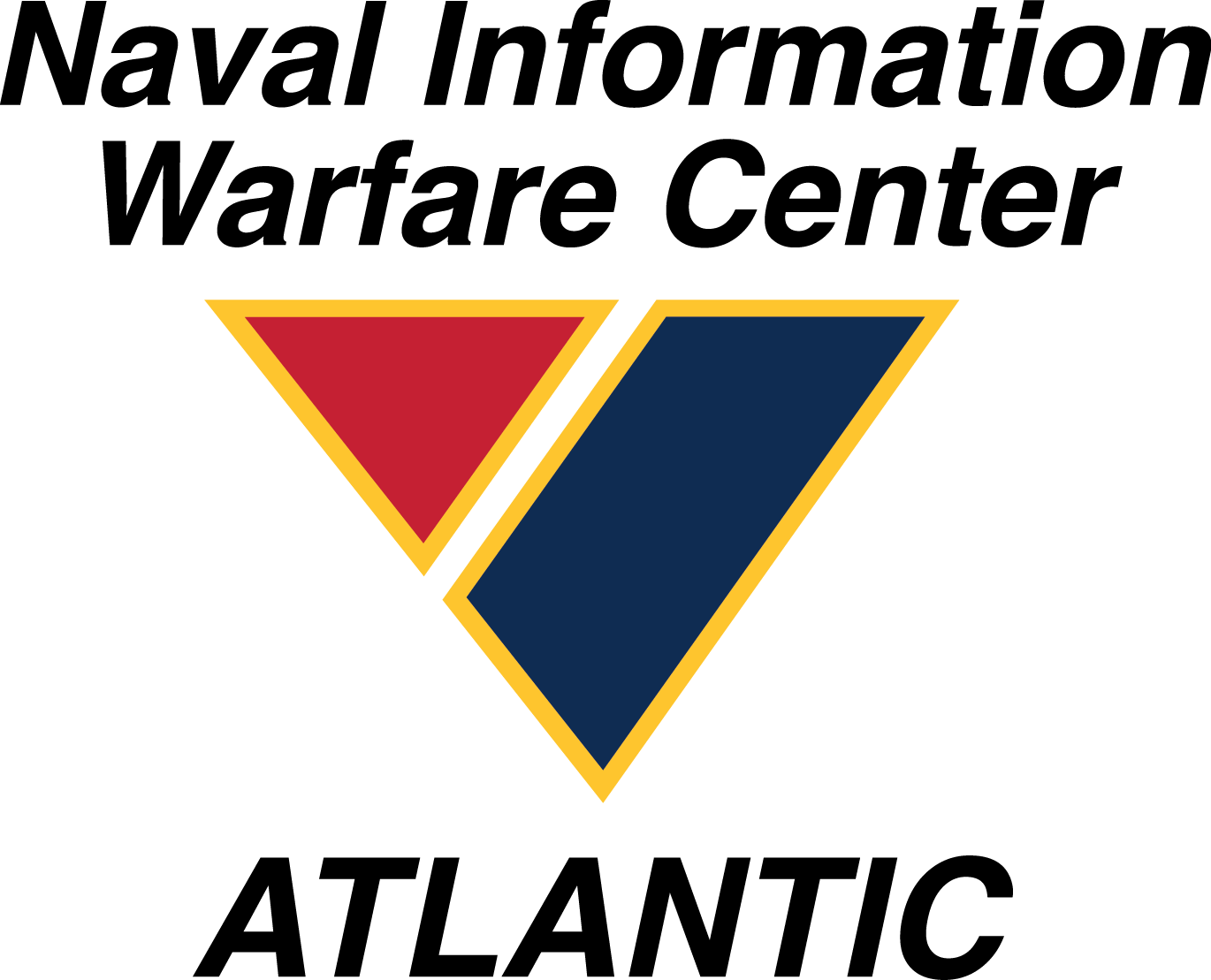
Naval Information Warfare Center Atlantic

== See also ==
- List of United States Air Force installations
- List of United States Navy installations
