= Naval Consolidated Brig =

Naval Consolidated Brig may refer to:

- Naval Consolidated Brig, Chesapeake in Chesapeake, Virginia
- Naval Consolidated Brig, Charleston in Hanahan, South Carolina
- Naval Consolidated Brig, Miramar in San Diego, California
