= Cane Bay Plantation, South Carolina =

2000s master-planned community in Berkeley County, South Carolina

Cane Bay Plantation
- Unincorporated community
- Interactive map of Cane Bay Plantation
- Coordinates: 33.11°N 80.12°W
- Country: United States
- State: South Carolina
- County: Berkeley
- Established: 2005

Population
  - Total: ~15,000
- Time zone: Eastern (EST)
  - Summer (DST): EDT
- ZIP code: 29486
- Website: www.cane-bay.com

Cane Bay Plantation is a planned community spanning roughly 7,000 acres in Berkeley County, South Carolina, in the Charleston Metropolitan Area. Although not an incorporated community or census-designated place, there are close to 15,000 permanent residents within the community.

Cane Bay was established by the Gramling Brothers development company in 2005 and expanded with several land purchases afterward. It is located approximately 7 miles northeast of Summerville and 25 miles north of Charleston. It is one of the largest planned communities in the United States
