= Charleston Air Force Base =

US Air Force Base in South Carolina

- Near North Charleston, South Carolina in the United States of America
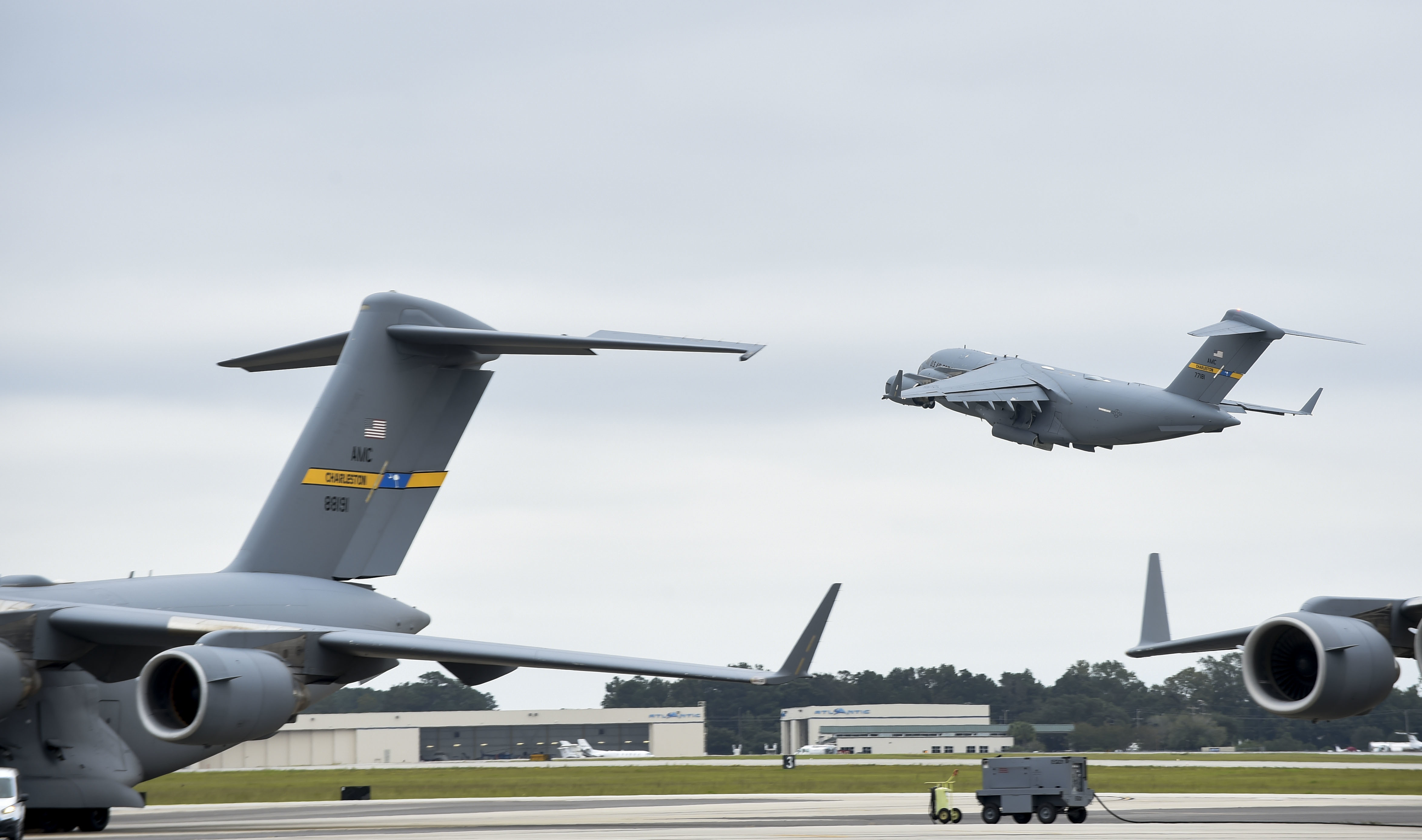
- A C-17A Globemaster III of the 437th Airlift Wing taking off from Charleston AFB

Site information
- Type: US Air Force base
- Owner: Department of Defense
- Operator: US Air Force
- Website: www.jbcharleston.jb.mil

Location
- Location within South Carolina Location within the United States Location within North America
- Coordinates: 32°53′55″N 080°02′26″W

Site history
- Built: 1942
- In use: 1942 – 2009
- Fate: Merged in 2009 to become an element of Joint Base Charleston

Airfield information
- Identifiers: IATA: CHS, ICAO: KCHS, FAA LID: CHS, WMO: 722083
- Elevation: 46 metres (151 ft) AMSL
Runways
Direction	Length and surface
15/33	2,743.5 metres (9,001 ft) concrete
03/21	2,133.6 metres (7,000 ft) concrete
- Airfield shared with Charleston International Airport; Source: Federal Aviation Administration

Charleston Air Force Base (IATA: CHS, ICAO: KCHS, FAA LID: CHS) is a United States military facility located in the City of North Charleston, South Carolina. The facility is under the jurisdiction of the United States Air Force's 628th Air Base Wing (628 ABW), a subordinate element of the Air Mobility Command (AMC). It is part of Joint Base Lindsey Graham (former Joint Base Charleston), which combined Charleston Air Force Base with Naval Support Activity Charleston.

== Overview ==
A joint civil-military airport, Charleston Air Force Base today shares its runways with Charleston International Airport for commercial airline aircraft operations, and a commercial aircraft factory making Boeing aircraft, on the south side of the airfield and general aviation aircraft operations on the east side. The 437th Airlift Wing (437 AW) of the Air Mobility Command (AMC) and the 315th Airlift Wing (315 AW) of the Air Force Reserve Command (AFRC) operate the C-17A Globemaster III from the base. The installation has also in the past maintained an alert site for rotational Air Combat Command (ACC) and ACC-gained Air National Guard fighter-interceptor aircraft.

== Units ==
Charleston Air Force Base is home to the 628th Air Base Wing (628 ABW), the host wing for installation support. The 628 ABW's primary duties are to provide installation support to 53 DoD and Federal agencies, servicing a total force of over 79,000 airmen, sailors, soldiers, Marines, Coast Guardsmen, civilians, dependents and retirees on Charleston AFB and Naval Weapons Station Charleston. Additionally, they also provide expeditionary Airmen to combatant commanders in support of joint and combined operations.

The 437th Airlift Wing (437 AW) operates the C-17 Globemaster III strategic airlift aircraft in support of its mission to provide airlift of troops and passengers, military equipment, cargo, and aeromedical equipment and supplies worldwide in accordance with tasking by Air Mobility Command and unified combatant commanders.

The air base has four operational groups consisting of 21 squadrons and two wing staff directorates. It is augmented by a parallel, collocated Air Force Reserve Command (AFRC) "associate" wing, the 315th Airlift Wing (315 AW), which shares the same C-17 aircraft with the 437 AW.

In addition, the USAF Auxiliary / Civil Air Patrol's Coastal Charleston Composite Squadron is also assigned to Charleston Field, utilizing the Charleston AFB Aero Club facility near the control tower.

== History ==
=== Air Force base ===
The history of Charleston Air Force Base began in 1919 when U.S. Army Colonel Herbert A. Dargue, then Chief of the Air Service (forerunner to the Federal Aviation Administration), visited the area looking for a suitable landing field for "aeroplanes. Charles Lindbergh's nonstop solo crossing of the Atlantic Ocean in 1927 heightened city officials' interest to establish air operations in Charleston.

In 1928, the City of Charleston rented land and began operating a simple airfield about twelve miles north of city limits. Foreseeing a commercial future in air travel, the city formed the Charleston Aircraft Corporation to acquire the land for a municipal airport. In May 1931, the corporation purchased 432 acres (175 ha) for $25,000 from the South Carolina Mining and Manufacturing Company. Later in the year, the city acquired the airport facility for $60,000 and immediately began improvements.

During the 1930s, airport operations expanded to keep pace with advances in general and commercial aviation being experienced throughout the country. Despite the Great Depression, the Federal Government stepped in to assist the city with modernizing the airport. In 1935, the Works Progress Administration poured $313,000 into the airport. Workers paved one 3,500-foot-long runway (1,100 m) and constructed a second 3,000-foot one (910 m). The project also improved upon the existing lighting system with up-to-date field lighting.

Given the continuing growth in passenger aviation, Pan American Airways selected Charleston Airport as its western terminus for trans-Atlantic flights. Although this plan never came to fruition, it contributed to a burgeoning increase in traffic for the airport. As a result, the city purchased 300 more acres (120 ha) of land surrounding the airport for $300,000 in 1937 to accommodate additional service buildings and hangars.

==== World War II ====
In 1939, with world tensions heightening, the United States Army Air Corps began a massive buildup of troops, bases, and equipment in preparation for war. As a result, Charleston acquired more land in 1940 for additional airport improvements that included construction of a hangar and administration building and lengthening of the runways to 5,000 feet. Prior to the U.S. entering World War II, in 1941 the War Department allotted another $199,000 to the Charleston Airport for runway extension and other improvements needed for aircraft dispersal against attack.

After the Pearl Harbor attack on 7 December 1941, the 56th Pursuit Group based at Charlotte Airport, North Carolina, and its 61st Pursuit Squadron arrived at the Charleston airport. The squadron's P-39 Airacobra and P-40 Warhawk aircraft provided coastal defense operations for the Southern Defense Command, Third Air Force, Carolina Sector. Arriving later that month, the 67th Observation Group, 107th Observation Squadron and the Federalized 105 Observation Squadron (Tennessee National Guard) provided antisubmarine patrols along the east coast with North American O-47 and Stinson O-49 Vigilant observation aircraft.

On 11 December the War Department assumed de facto control of Charleston Municipal Airport yet allowed Delta and Eastern commercial airlines to continue their civilian operations. Although Air Corps personnel had operated from the airport since the war began, true occupancy did not take place until 23 March 1942 when the city of Charleston and the War Department signed a lease and formally activated the installation.

Effective 1 April 1942, the base was assigned to Air Service Command and 29th Air Base Group, Distribution Point No. 2 became the first host unit responsible for building, maintaining and operating the installation infrastructure. On 9 June that same year, the base transferred to First Air Force and was officially named Charleston Army Air Base on 22 October 1942. The installation transferred back to Air Service Command in December 1942, then moved back to First Air Force in September 1943 where it remained until the end of the war. At the same time as the base struggled to find its niche, the 16th Antisubmarine Squadron operated B-34 Lexington bombers helping defend the eastern seaboard from possible attack.

On 31 March 1944, Johns Island Army Airfield became an auxiliary of Charleston AAB, providing an emergency landing field for the base.

Renamed Charleston Army Air Field on 15 June 1943, initially the base served mainly as an air depot training station, providing the final phase of training to service groups and air depot groups departing home for the war overseas. Concurrent with its reassignment to First Air Force, in September 1943 the base changed missions. Now it would give the final phase of training to B-24 Liberator crews. The 454th Bombardment Group arrived in September and left Charleston for the European Theater of Operations in December 1943. This same month the 400th Bombardment Group arrived, but this organization was to function as a replacement training unit rather than an operational training unit.

On 10 April 1944, the 113th Army Air Field Base Unit (CCTS-H) activated and took over as Charleston's host unit. But the need for B-24 crews ended with Germany's defeat and end of the war in Europe. In their place, however, the Army Air Force required a large number of transport crews. Consequently, the base was transferred to Air Transport Command on 1 June 1945 and began C-54 Skymaster crew training that lasted until late August 1945.

Only a few months after the Japanese surrender, on 25 April 1946 the government placed the base in surplus status as part of the massive postwar draw down. The city of Charleston requested that the field, which originally had been leased to the U.S. Army for $1 per year, be returned to the municipality. By this time, the field consisted of 2,050 acres (830 ha) with more than $12 million worth of facilities and improvements. Despite not being official returned to the city until 19 October 1948, the city council voted to construct a new air terminal in 1947, and commercial air operations resumed on a full-time basis at the now fully civilian airport.

==== Cold War ====
As a result of the Cold War, the now independent United States Air Force requesting funds from Congress to begin troop carrier operations at the Charleston airport. By August 1951, Congress approved a $28 million public works improvement package, and during the remainder of the year, preliminary work was underway to construct facilities for a troop carrier wing. In March 1952, the city of Charleston signed a lease agreement with the Air Force for joint use of the airport. For $1 per year the lease allowed the U.S. Air Force to occupy all properties south and west of the Southern Railway's tracks while the city retained terminal buildings, hangars, and other buildings along the north and east boundaries of the airport. Construction of base facilities, meanwhile, began in May 1952.

By early 1953, elements of the 456th Troop Carrier Wing, assigned to Tactical Air Command, arrived at Charleston to prepare the base for operational status. On 1 June 1953, the base received its current name of Charleston Air Force Base and activated on 1 August. Two weeks later, on 15 August 1953, the arrival of 50 C-119 Flying Boxcars effectively made the base operational. Although numerous construction projects were still underway, the wing held a dedication ceremony on 13 November 1953 to open the base officially.

==== Worldwide airlift ====
With the 456th already in place, advance elements of the newly activated 1608th Air Transport Group, assigned to Military Air Transport Command (later, Military Airlift Command), first arrived in February 1954 to establish operations. One month later on 4 March 1954, the group received its first C-54 Skymaster transport. As the 1608th increased in size, MATS and TAC negotiated ownership of the base. Eventually, on 1 March 1955, Charleston AFB came under the jurisdiction and control of MATS and the 1608th Air Transport Wing (Medium) became the base's host unit. Also upon assignment to MATS, the base became the terminus for all C-54 airlift to Europe and the Near East.

On 16 February 1954, Air Defense Command established the 444th Fighter-Interceptor Squadron as a tenant unit on Charleston flying F-86D Sabre fighter aircraft as the east coast's air defense against airborne invaders. Soon after, the base achieved permanent status and with that declaration MATS began various facility construction projects to further improve upon the base's status. Meanwhile, the 1608th received its first C-121C Constellation appropriately named "City of Charleston" on 16 September 1955 (tail number 54-153). Shortly thereafter the base was designated as an aerial port of embarkation, giving Charleston AFB more prominent role in MATS. Tactical Air Command and the 456th left Charleston on 16 October 1955, which also ended the base's association with the C-119 Flying Boxcars.

Charleston AFB underwent a significant change on 18 June 1958 when the 1608th received its first C-124C Globemaster aircraft, then again a month later when it lost its last C-54 transports. The 444th Fighter-Interceptor Squadron's aircraft changed as well. In February 1960, it began operating F-101 Voodoo aircraft and lost its F-86Ds.

The next big change came in 1962. The Air Force decided to retire the C-121 fleet and sent the 1608th its first replacement C-130 Hercules on 16 August 1962. The last C-121 Connie left Charleston AFB on 9 February 1963. Only two years later, on 14 August 1965, the wing received its first C-141 Starlifter, the newest airlifter in the Air Force inventory. But, unlike the previous aircraft changes, the arrival of this new aircraft meant a change in host units.

On 8 January 1966, the 437th Military Airlift Wing took over as Charleston AFB's host unit. Although the 1608th inactivated and the 437th activated its place, it appeared that every unit with a "1608" in its name simply changed it to "437." All of the 1608th's people, aircraft, buildings, etc. became the 437th's. The operational history of Charleston AFB is now inextricably tied to the 437th Airlift Wing's history.

Soon after the wing's arrival, on 30 September 1968 the 444th Fighter-Interceptor Squadron inactivated, ending Charleston AFB's long-standing association with air defense and fighter aircraft. In September 1969, the Air Force Reserve Command's 943d Military Airlift Group activated at Charleston AFB making it the first associate unit in the southeastern United States. On 1 July 1973, the 315th Military Airlift Wing (Associate) activated and replaced the 943d as the 437th's associate Reserve wing, similar to how the 437th replaced the 1608th a few years earlier.

==== From the 1990s ====
In 1992, following the disestablishment of MAC as part of an Air Force-wide reorganization, the 437th Military Airlift Wing (437 MAW) was placed under the newly established Air Mobility Command (AMC) and redesignated as the 437th Airlift Wing (437 AW) and 315th Airlift Wing (315 AW), respectively.

Today, the 437 AW and 315 AW (Associate) operate the C-17 Globemaster III. The base has also maintained an alert site for fighter-interceptor aircraft (primarily Air National Guard aircraft) of Tactical Air Command (TAC) and Air Combat Command (ACC), conducting the continental air defense mission. The last unit to occupy the alert site was a detachment of F-16 aircraft from the 158th Fighter Wing of the Vermont Air National Guard. Detachment operations officially ended at the end of FY99, with the facility placed in caretaker status. However, since 11 September 2001, the facility has seen intermittent operations by various USAF fighter aircraft of the Active and Reserve Components resuming the continental air defense mission under the cognizance of United States Northern Command and NORAD. In FY 2014-2015 the alert site and associated hangar were demolished.

==== Major commands to which assigned ====
- Air Service Command, 1 April 1942
- First Air Force, 9 June 1942
- Air Service Command

Designated for concurrent use by Army Air Forces Antisubmarine Command, 19 December 1942

- First Air Force, 17 September 1943
- Air Transport Command, 1 June 1945 – 29 April 1946.
- Tactical Air Command,

Eighteenth Air Force, 23 April 1952 – 1 March 1955

- Air Defense Command (Attached) 16 February 1954 – 30 September 1968

Eastern Air Defense Force, 16 February 1954 – 1 January 1960

- Military Air Transport Service

Eastern Transport Air Force, 1 March 1955
Redesignated: Military Airlift Command
Twenty-First Air Force, 1 January 1966 – 1 June 1992

- Air Mobility Command

Twenty-First Air Force, 1 June 1992 – 1 October 2003
Eighteenth Air Force, 1 October 2003 – present

Note: Inactivated and declared surplus 25 April 1946; custody assumed by Army division Engineers, 29 June 1946; transferred to War Assets Administration, 24 May 1947; assigned AF in inactive status, 11 July 1952; reactivated 1 August 1953.

==== Major units assigned ====
- 67th Observation Group, 23 December 1941 – 26 January 1942
- 421st Base HQ and Air Base Squadron, 1 November 1942 – 10 April 1944
- 521st Bombardment Squadron

Redesignated 16th Antisubmarine Squadron, 18 October 1942 – 18 September 1943

- Charleston Air Defense Region, 1 January 1943 – 10 April 1944
- 36th Fighter Group, 22 June – 14 September 1943
- 400th Bombardment Group, 15 December 1943 – 10 April 1944
- 454th Bombardment Group, 3 October – 10 April 1944
- 113th AAF Base Unit, 10 April 1944 – 31 May 1945
- 389th Bombardment Group, 12 June 1945 – 13 September 1945
- 392d Bombardment Group, 25 June 1945 – 13 September 1945
- 593d AAF Base Unit, 20 May 1945 – 25 April 1946
- 456th Troop Carrier Wing, (TAC) 1 August 1953 – 16 October 1955
- 444th Fighter-Interceptor Squadron, (ADC) 16 February 1954 – 30 September 1968
- Aerial Port of Embarkation, 3 January 1956 – 15 February 1978
- 1608th Air Transport Group, 15 January 1954

Redesignated 1608th Air Transport Wing, 1 March 1955
Redesignated: 437th Military Airlift (later Airlift) Wing, 8 January 1966 – present

- 315th Military Airlift (later Airlift) Wing, 1 July 1973–present
- 628th Air Base Wing, 8 January 2010–present

References for history introduction, major commands and major units

==== Current status ====
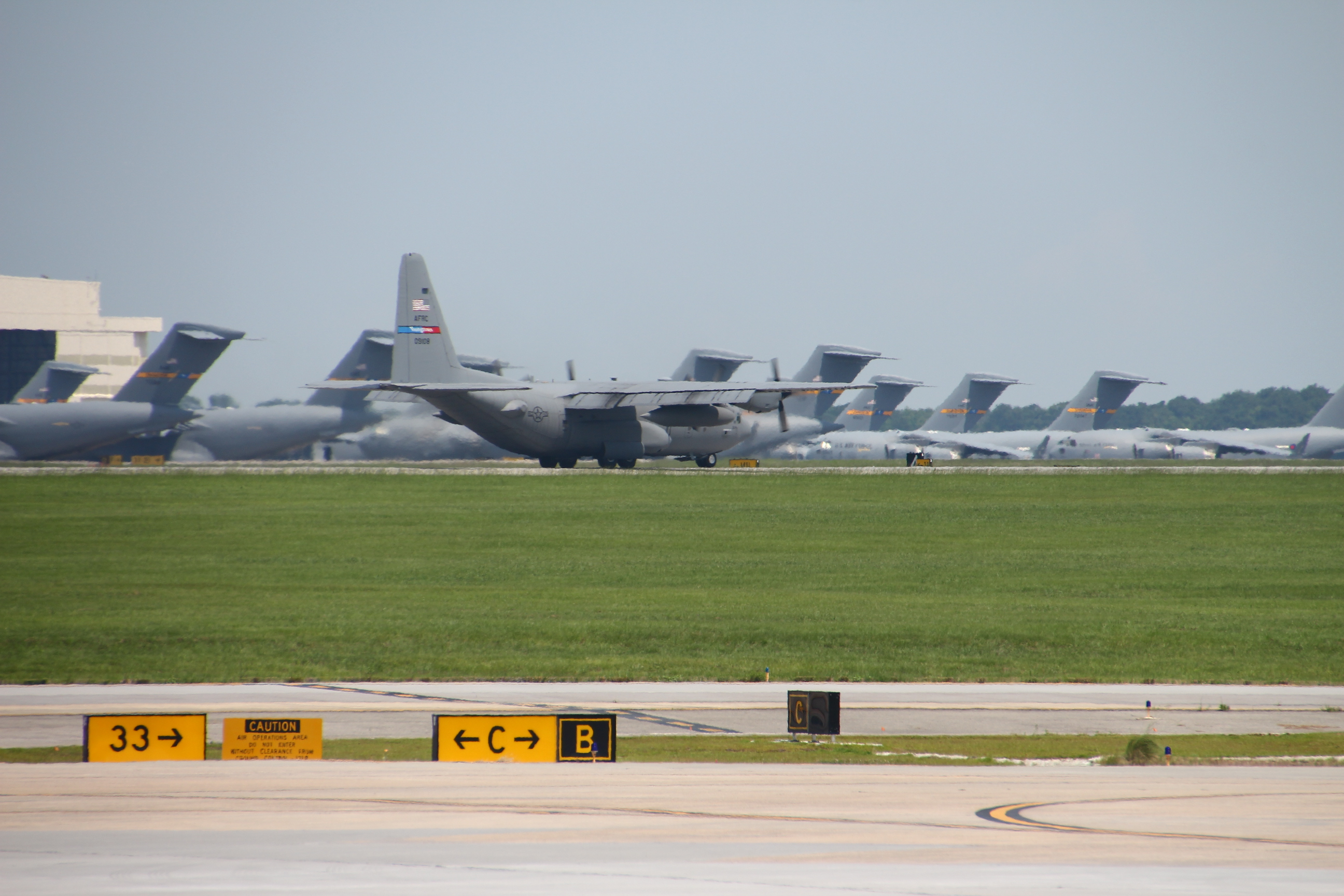
C-130 on taxiway with C-17's parked in the background at Charleston Air Force Base (2014)

An Air Force Times article dated 21 December 2009 announced the activation of the 628th Air Wing to "take over administrative duties for a number of military commands" in January 2010. The 628th "will essentially serve as the 'landlord' for Charleston Air Force Base, the Charleston Naval Consolidated Brig and about 50 other military commands. The unit will handle items such as building and grounds services, supply and civil engineering and public works.

After nearly a year of much needed work, runway 03/21 at Joint Base Charleston reopened on 25 February 2010. The $30 million project to rebuild the deteriorating runway began 9 April 2009. Its completion was marked with the first take off and landing of a Charleston C-17. The runway now has newly paved asphalt overruns, and 25-foot-wide (7.6 m) asphalt-paved shoulders, both of which the runway lacked. The runway also has new edge lighting, distance remaining markers and runway end indicator lights on both ends.

Because of that construction, larger and heavier aircraft were cleared to land on runway 03/21, which was key when work scheduled for Fiscal Year 2012 began on runway 15/33, the base's main runway. The last major work done on Joint Base Charleston runways was in 1968.

The Joint Base Charleston Passenger Terminal reopened in their new facility on November 21, 2022, after undergoing renovations that began in 2018. Construction was briefly halted in 2019 after the damaging effects of Hurricane Dorian, the category 5 Atlantic hurricane, which made landfall on September 5, 2019.

== See also ==
- South Carolina World War II Army Airfields
