= 628th Air Base Wing =

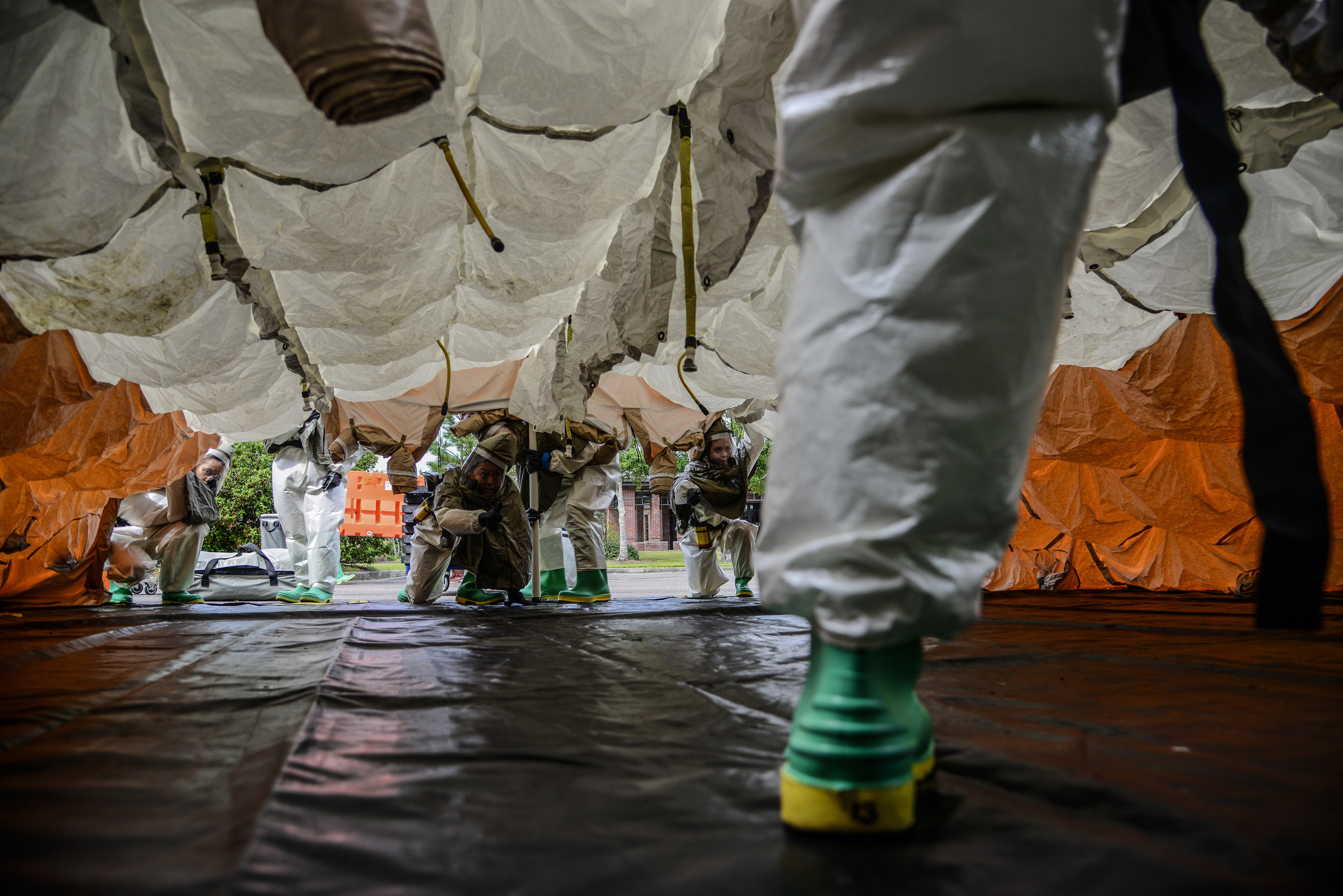
- 628th Medical Group erects a decontamination tent during an exercise
- Active: 2010-present
- Country: United States
- Branch: United States Air Force
- Role: Military installation support
- Part of: Air Mobility Command
- Garrison/HQ: Joint Base Lindsey Graham
- Website: https://www.jbcharleston.jb.mil/Units/

Commanders
- Current commander: Col. Kenneth M. Shirley II
- Deputy commander: CAPT G. Reed Koepp II (USN)
- Executive Director: GS-14 Ray A. Forcier
- Command Chief: CCM Richard B. Lamm
- Command Master Chief: CMDCM Frederick J. Tuiel (USN)

Insignia
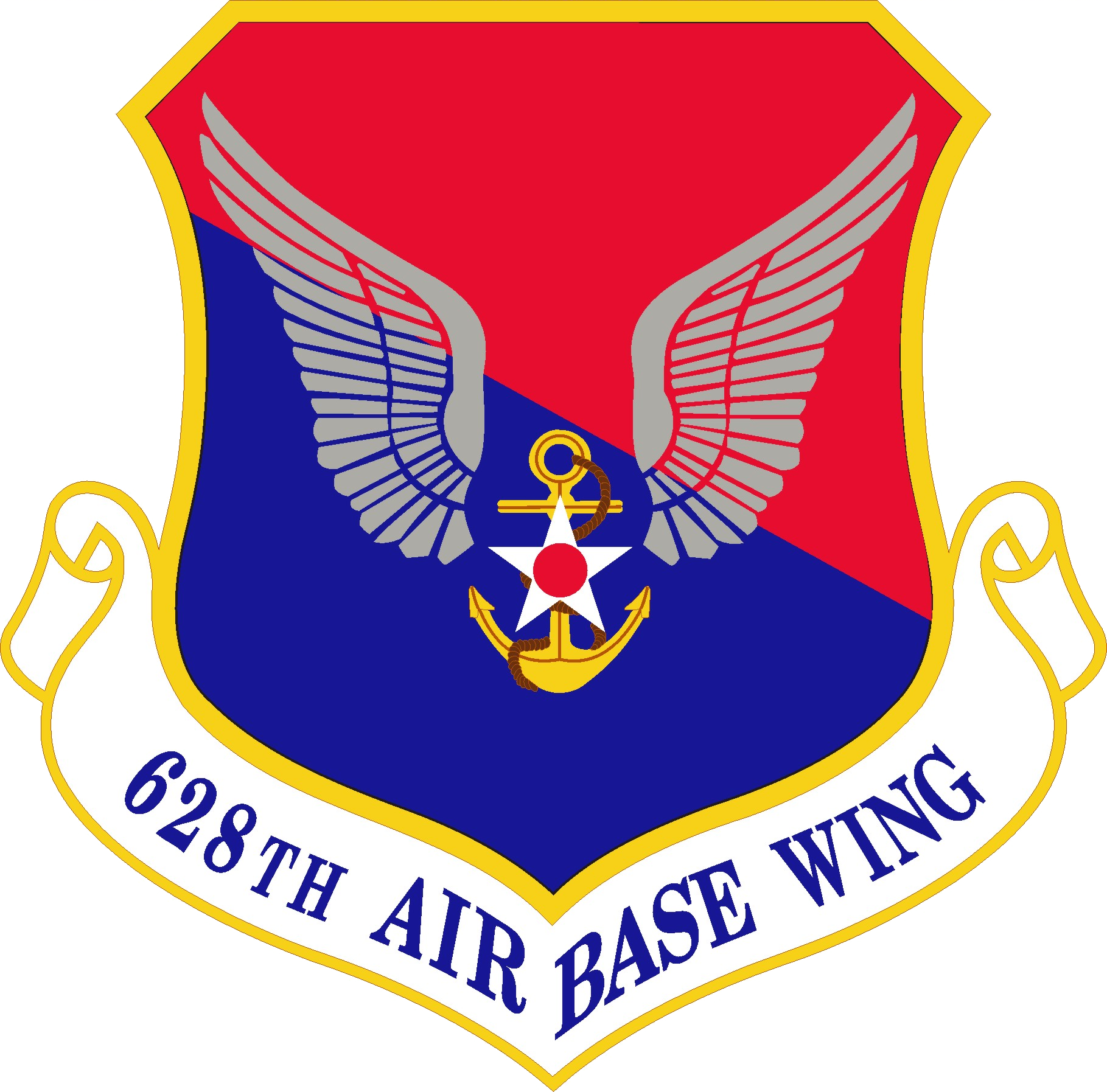
- 628th Air Base Wing emblem (Approved 20 September 2010)

The United States Air Force's 628th Air Base Wing is an administrative unit located at Joint Base Lindsey Graham (former Joint Base Charleston), in North Charleston, South Carolina. The 628 ABW was activated on 8 January 2010 as Charleston Air Force Base was merged with Naval Weapons Station Charleston as a result of changes after Base Realignment and Closure Commission recommendations.

Naval Support Activity Charleston was reorganized as an "Embedded Military Unit" within the Joint Base Charleston 628 ABW. NSA Charleston Navy personnel are embedded into the Air Base Wing installation support squadrons to carry out their functions. After the creation of the Joint Base, the Naval Support Activity Charleston Commanding Officer became the Deputy Commander of the 628th Air Base Wing, responsible to the Wing Commander for base installation support.

The wing provides support services such as housing and facilities maintenance, security, childcare, public works, safety, communications, finance, logistics, medical support, personnel, public affairs, legal, food service, contracts, and recreation.

The 628th Air Base Wing's primary duties are to provide installation support to 53 Department of Defense and Federal agencies, supporting a total force of over 79,000 airmen, sailors, soldiers, marines, coast guardsmen, civilians, dependents and retirees on Charleston AFB and Naval Weapons Station Charleston. It maintains $2.0 billion worth of physical infrastructure across 23,000 non-contiguous acres. They also provide expeditionary airmen to combatant commanders in support of joint and combined operations.

== Lineage ==
- Constituted as the 628th Air Base Wing
- Activated on 8 January 2010

== Assignments ==
- Eighteenth Air Force, 8 January 2010
- United States Air Force Expeditionary Center, 1 January 2011 – present

== Components ==
- 628th Mission Support Group, 8 January 2010 – present
- 628th Medical Group, 8 January 2010 – present
- 628th Air Base Wing Staff Directorate, 8 January 2010 – present
