= MV Cape Ducato =

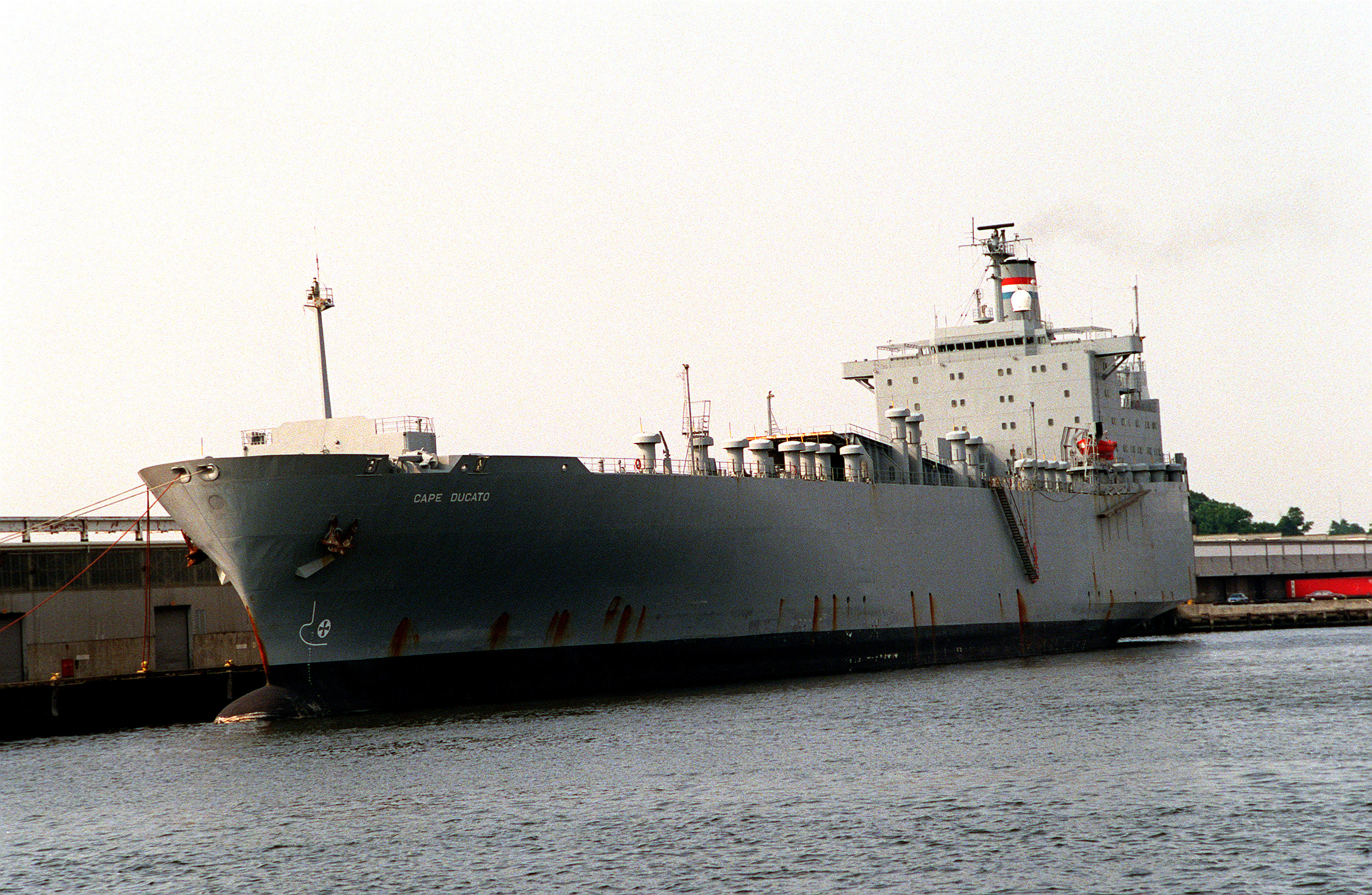
- MV Cape Ducato (T-AKR-5051)

History

United States
- Name: MV Cape Ducato (T-AKR-5051)
- Builder: Eriksbergs Mekaniska Verkstad, Gothenburg, Sweden
- Launched: 15 March 1972
- Acquired: 18 November 1985
- Home port: Charleston, SC
- Identification: IMO number: 7208297; MMSI number: 368922000; Callsign: WMHF
- Status: Ready Reserve Force – Five day activation notice
- Notes: Built as the MV Barranduna

General characteristics
- Class & type: Cape D Class Roll-on/Roll-off Vehicle Cargo Ship
- Displacement: 34,617 tons
- Length: 680 ft 4 in (207.37 m)
- Beam: 91 ft 0 in (27.74 m)
- Draft: 31 ft 4 in (9.55 m)
- Propulsion: Medium Speed Diesel, 10,777 SHP
- Speed: 16.2 kn (18.6 mph; 30.0 km/h)
- Capacity: 125,516 sq. ft. vehicle space
- Complement: Full Operational Status: 27 civilian mariners
- Armament: None
- Aviation facilities: None

MV Cape Ducato (T-AKR-5051) was delivered in September 1972, as MV Barranduna at Eriksbergs Mekaniska Verkstads AB, Sweden. She was acquired by the US Maritime Administration (MARAD) on 18 November 1985 and renamed MV Cape Ducato. She was assigned to MARAD Ready Reserve Force, (RRF) and is one of the Military Sealift Command's (MSC) 31 Roll-on/Roll-off ships and one of the 63 ships of the Sealift Program Office. Cape Ducato is laid up as part of the National Defense Reserve Fleet in a layberth at Joint Base Charleston in North Charleston, South Carolina in ROS-5 status.
