= Charleston Naval Hospital Historic District =

Historic district in South Carolina, United States

- U.S. National Register of Historic Places
- U.S. Historic district
- Charleston Naval Hospital in 1948

- Location within South Carolina Location within the United States
- Location: Former Charleston Navy Base including portions of Turnbull Avenue, Hobby Street, Avenue F, Avenue G, Avenue H, Avenue I, Truxton Avenue, and Marine Avenue, North Charleston, South Carolina
- Coordinates: 32°51′55″N 79°58′33″W
- Area: 33.73 acres (13.65 ha)
- Built: 1903
- Architect: Multiple
- Architectural style: Late 19th And 20th Century Revivals, Modern Movement
- NRHP reference No.: 10000851
- Added to NRHP: October 22, 2010

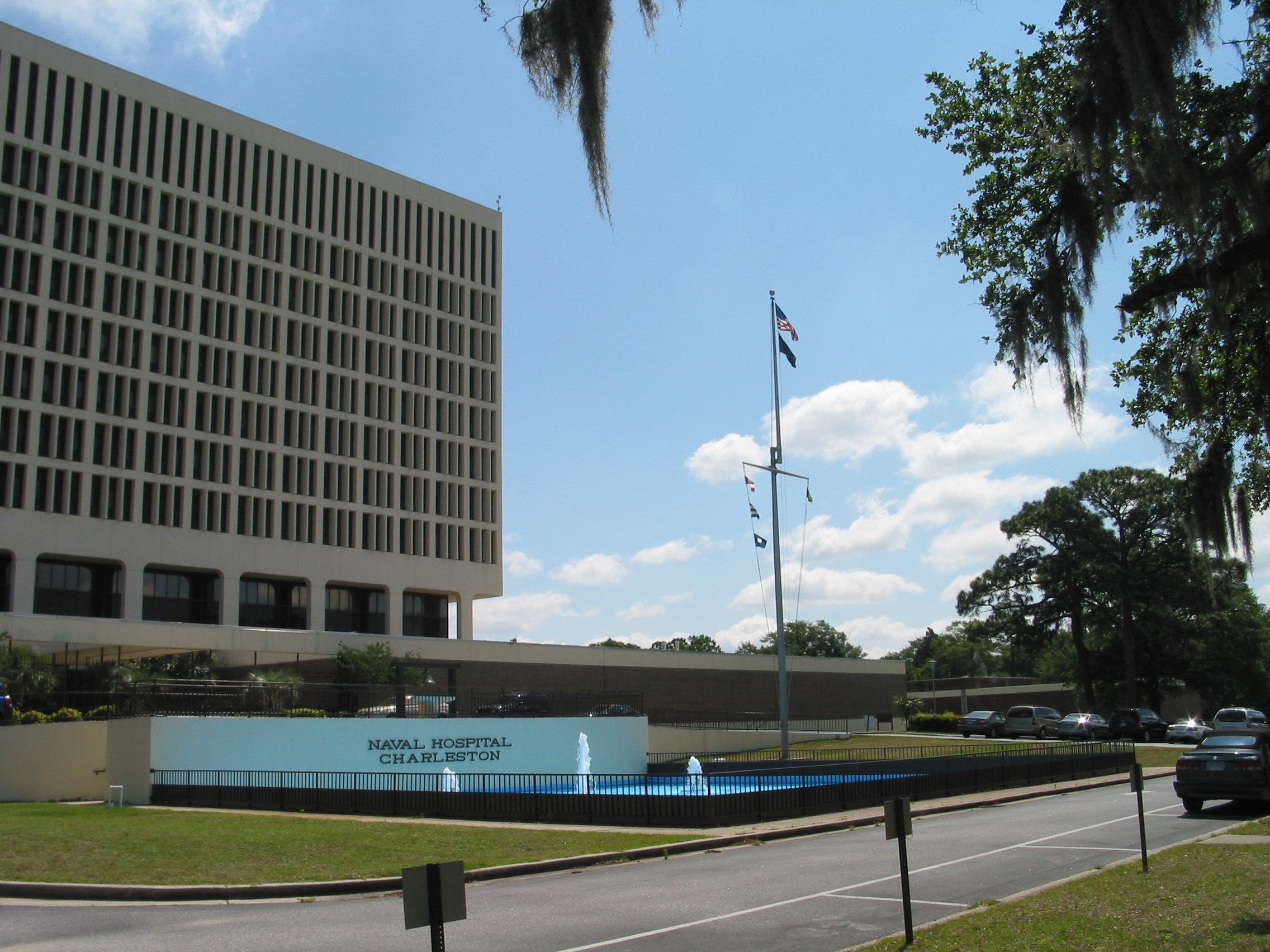
Naval Health Clinic Charleston, located in the City of North Charleston, South Carolina

U.S. Navy Ambulance

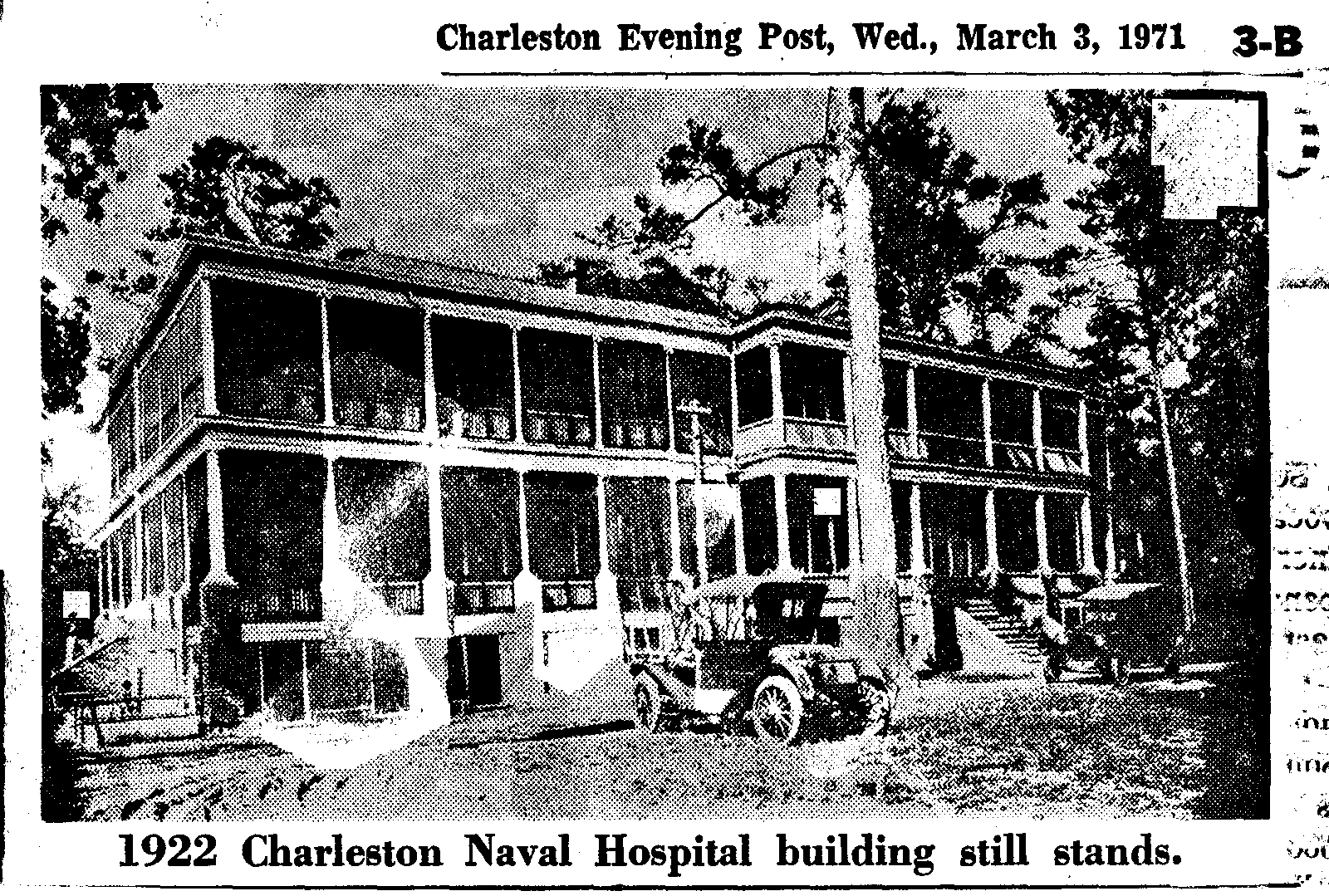
Charleston Naval Hospital in 1922, North Charleston

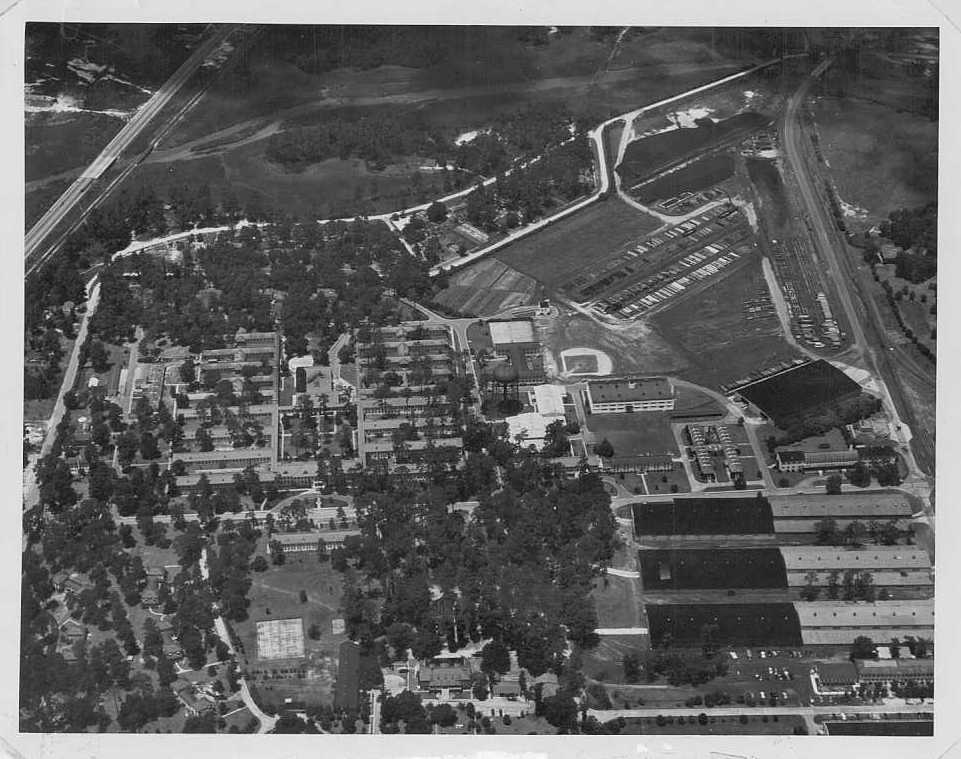
Charleston Naval Hospital aerial view July 7, 1949, North Charleston

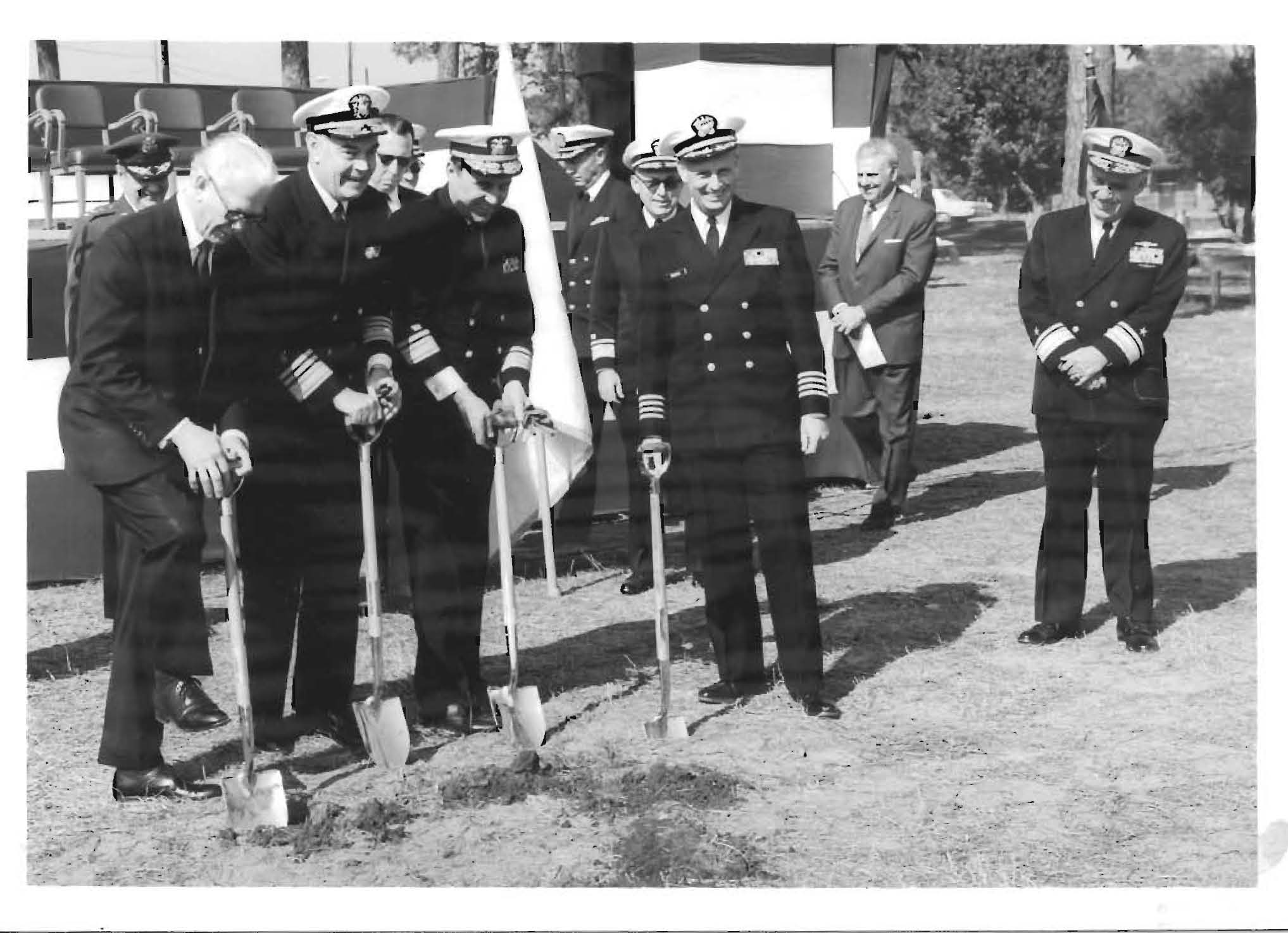
Naval Hospital Ground Breaking 14 February 1970, North Charleston

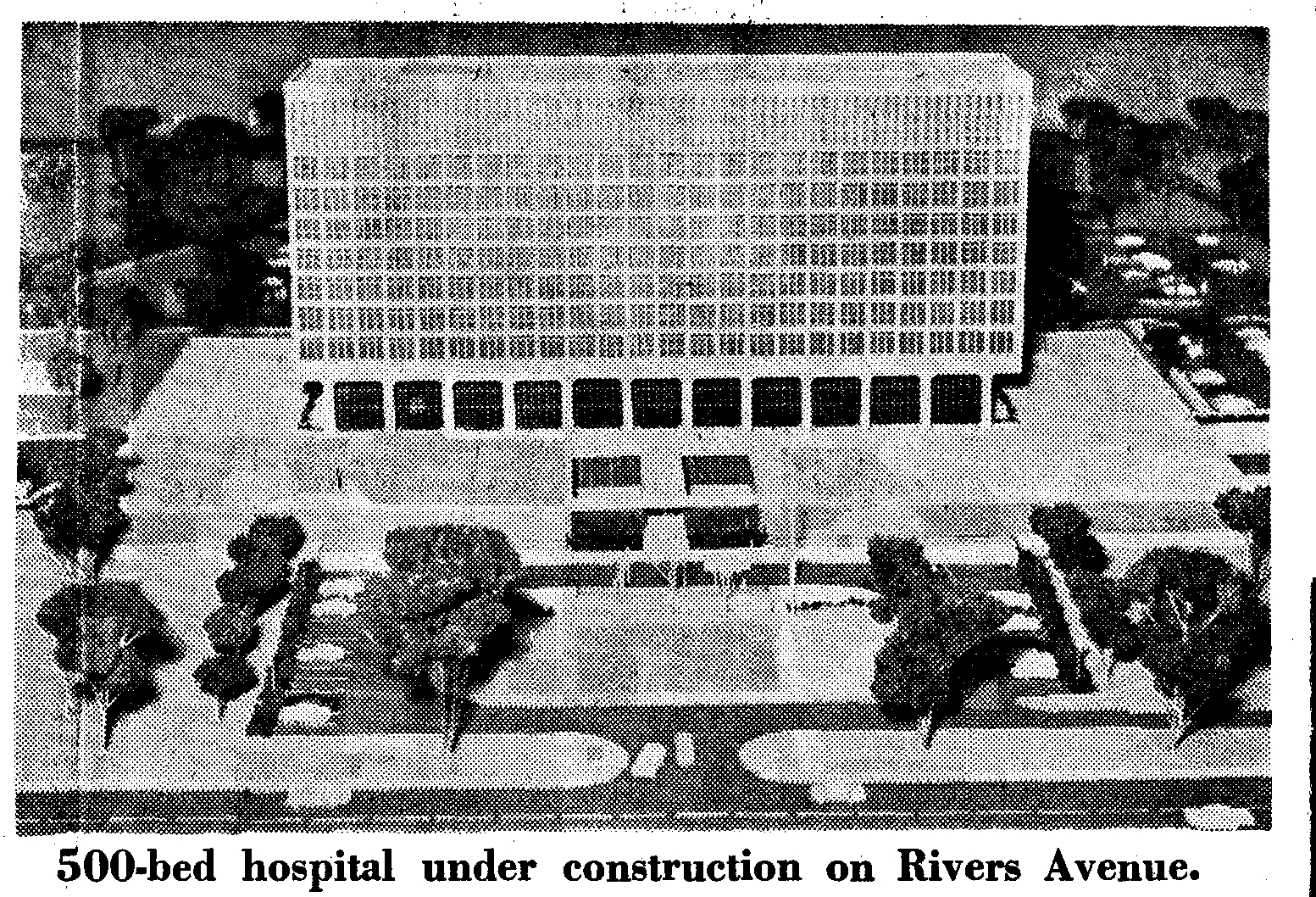
Artist Conception of new Naval Hospital, North Charleston

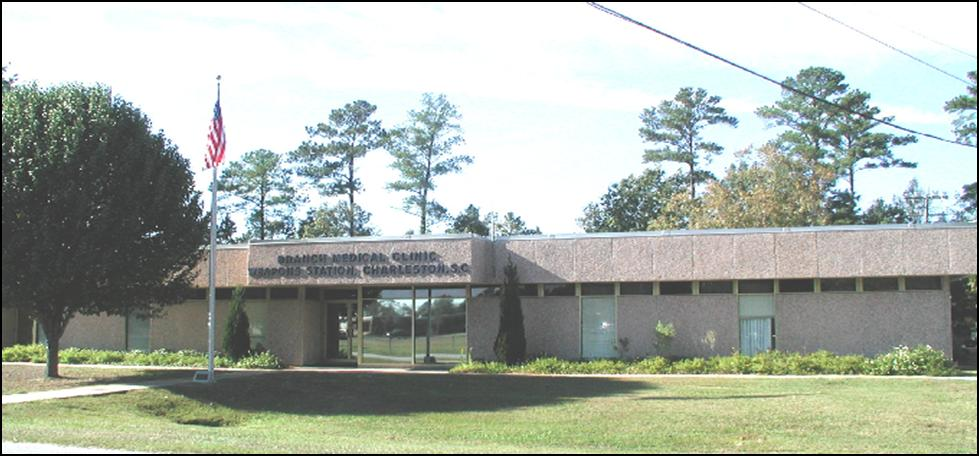
The Branch Medical Clinic

NNPTC

Navy Charleston Medical Wellness-Readiness Clinic

Navy Charleston Dental Clinic

The Charleston Naval Hospital Historic District is a portion of the Charleston Navy Base that included a collection of buildings connected with the medical needs of the Navy base.

== Early years: 1902-1922 ==
On 2 November 1902 the Bureau of Medicine and Surgery bought 96.5 acres (391,000 m^{2}) of land that was owned by the city of Charleston, South Carolina adjoining the northwest side of the Navy Yard. Later transfers to the Navy Yard reduced the acreage to 43.14 acres (174,600 m^{2}), the number of acres recorded in hospital records as of 1 November 1949.

After establishment of the Navy Yard in 1902, the Medical Department activities occupied "hospital" tents near the site of the Marine Corps Post Exchange. In 1905 a Marine Sick Quarters was erected in the same place. During this period, the Medical Officer of the Yard had an office in the Post Office building in Charleston, making a daily trip to the Yard by street car. In 1905, a room in one of the then-existing buildings at the Yard was allotted for use as a Medical Dispensary.

On June 26, 1906, Congress appropriated $12,000 to build a Yard Dispensary, but no bids from outside contractors were received, so it was not until December 1908 that a Yard Dispensary was completed by Yard labor. This wooden building was erected on brick piers near the center of the Navy Yard. Later a basement was added which functioned as a dispensary and as a small hospital with many of its patients in tents. Since its beginning, the building was repeatedly enlarged. In 1917 the west wing was added.

With the advent of World War I, this 28-bed dispensary, even with the addition of new buildings, was taxed beyond its capacity and was entirely inadequate to meet the hospital needs for the Naval Base, and the increased personnel caused by the establishment of the training camp to the capacity of 5000 men. Emergency facilities in the shape of tents and temporary beds were established in connection with the Naval Dispensary until a total capacity was reached for 120 patients. This was a temporary expedient to meet the circumstances incident to a sudden influx of men without accommodations for the sick.

In view of the necessity for a Naval Hospital in this area, a hospital was authorized to be constructed by the NAVAL EMERGENCY FUND ACT A contract was let with the Charleston Engineering & Constructing Co. to build the hospital. Work commenced on June 1, 1917, and the hospital was commissioned on July 31, 1917, in spite of many difficulties encountered in obtaining enough labor and a minor strike among the carpenters. The hospital was the original Naval Hospital built on the site located on the Medical Department Property that was purchased in 1902. The hospital consisted of 19 temporary, wooden buildings with a bed capacity of 250. These buildings included one administration building, one office building, one building for women nurses, nine ward buildings, one galley, a mess hall, garage, laundry, power house, stores house, and recreation hall. These were all one-story buildings, owing to the increased patient load, additional beds were urgently required, and by September 1918 fourteen additional buildings were constructed which increased the bed capacity to 1000 beds. These additional buildings were of wood finished in stucco and were erected south of the hospital reservation. The hospital made use of an ambulance to transport the sick from outlying stations of the Sixth Naval District and from vessels in the harbor to the hospital.

Commander W. M. Garton, MC, USN was its commanding officer during its construction and until July 1919.

In 1922, due to the increasing cost of maintenance and the decreasing number of patients, the Bureau of Medicine and Surgery decided to abandon the World War I Emergency hospital, and the then Yard Dispensary was reoccupied as a combined Naval Hospital and Dispensary. The Yard Dispensary was then designated a Naval Hospital. On 21 December 1922, the emergency hospital was officially closed and the Medical personnel transferred to the dispensary building. Certain of the buildings of the emergency hospital were moved adjacent to the Yard Dispensary and as other buildings were demolished, the materials were used to provide additional facilities at the Navy Yard Hospital. The changes had no other significance other that to return the hospital to a pre-war status.

== Middle years: 1922-1970 ==
This hospital/dispensary consisted of several frame buildings occupying about 4 acres (16,000 m^{2}) of land near the center of the Navy Yard, and had a bed capacity of 57. As indicated before, the main hospital building was completed in 1908 as a Yard Dispensary building, and between 1908 and 1938 new additions were built from time to time to the original structure as the need for expansion became necessary. A new wing was added to the main hospital building and the first floor of that wing was used for office space, the second floor was used for sick officers quarters, and the basement provided additional office and storage space. The building previously used for sick officers quarters, dental office and family clinic was converted for dependents hospitalization. A covered ramp connected this building with the main building. In 1937 work was underway on construction of a new hospital corpsman quarters west of this hospital building. The hospital corps quarters was then located on the Bureau of Medicine and Surgery property. Upon completion of the new quarters, the old quarters was converted to a contagious and genitourinary ward. The building previously used for contagious and genitourinary cases was then used as a Yard Dispensary, because the space in the main hospital was inadequate to include a Yard Dispensary. On 1 May 1941, the Yard Dispensary and the Naval Hospital, which had been combined, were separated into independent medical departments units. As the dispensary was an old war-time 1917-1918 frame structure and entirely inadequate, a new location and building were urgently needed which should be located more in and to the center of the industrial section. In July 1942, the dispensary was transferred to building number 58 of the Naval Shipyard at the entrance of the Third Street gate.

The emergency hospital buildings erected in 1917 were moved or torn down during the 1930s period with the exception of the then commanding officer's and executive officer's quarters, and building 21 (old medical storeroom) and the old mess hall for the original hospital. These four buildings were still standing and being used in 1975. The quarters 5, 6, and 7 that were used as Medical Officers quarters which were located at the West Gate entrance on hospital property were used as a sick bay for the recruit camp during World War I.

On 17 June 1940, work was commenced on the construction of two additional wards with a capacity of 60 patients. On 4 October 1940, these wards were completed, this gave the hospital a total capacity 117 beds which was still inadequate for the patient load at that time. In September 1940, funds amounting to about one million dollars were obtained from the Works Progress Administration for the construction of a 200-bed hospital.

In the spring of 1941, work commenced on the construction of a new naval hospital, which was located on the same site as the old World War I emergency hospital. On 13 April 1942 the new naval hospital was completed and commissioned. Originally visualized as a 200-bed hospital, permanent wards in reality had a total capacity of 380 beds. All permanent wards were completed and occupied with the exception of the psychopathic ward which was completed within the next ten days. All the 30-bed temporary wards were finished and four of the 40-bed temporary wards were about ninety per cent finished. Construction of the fifth temporary ward was soon begun and upon completion of this ward gave the hospital a bed capacity of 600. During 1942 the hospital was enlarged by the addition of ten single story wooden ward buildings as a continuation of two rows of permanent ward buildings. On 2 June 1944, 5 acres (20,000 m^{2}) of land was transferred back to the hospital from the Marine Corps. On this ground the Sick Officers' quarters annex was constructed and occupied in 1945.

In September 1944, construction began on a concrete tile walled 260 ft (79 m) by 42 ft (13 m) recreation building. Entering this building one will see beautiful mural adorned walls and paneled foyer. A frieze of 68 campaign ribbons in full color against a slate background is found in the foyer. At the soda fountain on the north wall of the ships service is a gigantic mural of life size Navy, Marine Corps, and Red Cross figures and a Gray Lady surrounding the seal of the Bureau of Medicine and Surgery. This is the work of Quartermaster First Class Wilko H. ANDERSON, who was a civilian portrait painter prior to his naval service. In this recreation lounge on the wide expanse of the south wall, a painted map of the world approximately 14 ft (4.3 m) by 35 ft (11 m), looks down upon many recreational activities. In addition to the murals in the ships service lounge, the walls of the Red Cross Service Room are adorned with the favorite characters of several famous cartoonists, drawn by the artists themselves when they visited the hospital. Other activities located in the Recreation Building were a first class Post Office, Barber Shop, Beauty Shop, Lounge Rooms, Telephone Booths, Library, Red Cross Offices, Recreation Office, and Movie Auditorium. The auditorium has a seating capacity of 542 and provides movies twice each evening.

== Later years: 1970-2007 ==
A groundbreaking ceremony was held 14 February 1970, officially marking the beginning of the new Charleston Naval Hospital, a modern 500-bed structure that would replace the hospital facilities contained in the outmoded quarters on the Charleston Naval Base.

The Naval Hospital, at the Navy Shipyard, remained in continual use until the dedication on 2 March 1973 of the Naval Regional Medical Center located at the intersection of Rivers and McMillan Avenues, North Charleston, South Carolina. The new 10-story hospital had a 500-bed capacity and 375,000 sq ft of floor space. The building had central heat and air conditioning, central dictating and transcribing system, central oxygen and vacuum system, television for patient's rooms, and vertical transport systems. It had two Intensive Care Units, seven operating rooms, three delivery rooms, and a Cardiac Care Unit, all equipped with life support systems. The new Naval Hospital served approximately 73,000 eligible patrons.

In March 1973 this new 500-bed Naval Hospital was completed and occupied, at a cost in excess of 18.5 million dollars.

The Naval Regional Medical Center, Charleston was established 1 July 1972 to provide improved patient care through improved utilization of resources including medical personnel. The Naval Regional Medical Center commands and coordinates the various Naval medical facilities and programs available to the Charleston and Beaufort communities. In addition to the core hospital, the command included Branch Clinics at the Naval Station, the Naval Shipyard, the Naval Weapons Station, and the Naval Hospital Beaufort with Branch Clinics at the Marine Corps Air Station and Marine Corps Recruit Depot, Parris Island. The commanding officer, Naval Regional Medical Center also served as the District Medical Officer, Sixth Naval District.

The Sixth Naval District was disestablished on September 30, 1980.

The early 1990s ushered in the zenith of Naval Hospital Charleston's status as a tertiary military treatment facility. At the time of the 75th anniversary ceremony in 1992, the Hospital employed over 1,200 personnel, delivered over 1,300 babies, performed more than 3,000 surgeries, admitted 9,000 patients into our wards, and treated over 365,000 beneficiaries.

In 1993, the Base Realignment and Closure (BRAC) began hearings at the Gaillard Auditorium in Charleston, South Carolina resulting in a significant reduction in Navy presence in the City of North Charleston. Just one year later, on 24 June 1994, the Family Practice Residency Program that had produced 185 graduating interns and 149 graduating residents since its inception in 1973 conducted its final graduation.

Personnel migrations resulting from BRAC actions reduced the number of active duty personnel and their family members in North Charleston from 77,000 in 1993 to fewer than 38,000 at the end of Fiscal Year 1995. During that same period, the total beneficiary population declined from 106,000 to 71,000. Though bed capacity had steadily declined prior to the BRAC actions, the loss of beneficiaries between 1993 and 1994 resulted in the rightsizing of Naval Hospital Charleston to 40 beds to support the population that remained in the catchment area effective 1 October 1995.

In 1996, North Charleston witnessed the final closure of its Naval Base and Shipyard and the City bid farewell to most of the mighty vessels of war that had long home ported at its piers – destroyers, frigates, cruisers, submarines, tenders and other support ships.

The Naval Hospital's Emergency Room and Intensive Care Unit were both disestablished in February 1998 to further optimize resources. Later that year on November 1, the Hospital implemented an External Resource Sharing Agreement with Trident Health System that provided Naval Hospital physicians and their patients with a full array of quality inpatient and surgical services to include General Surgery; Obstetrics and Gynecological Surgery; Ear, Nose and Throat Surgery; and Orthopedic Surgery.

April 14, 1999 marked the end of another era for the hospital. The Medical/Surgical Unit, the last inpatient ward at this facility, closed its doors to inpatient admissions after 26 years of service.

Another historic event occurred when, in October 2006, the Operating Room and Post Anesthesia Recovery and Ambulatory Procedures Units located on the hospital's 10th deck were disestablished during a poignant ceremony that celebrated the numerous safe and successful procedures performed by the dedicated surgeons and support staff during the 33 years that the units were in operation.

== Current years: 2007 and beyond ==
In alignment with the Chief of Naval Operation's vision of future force shaping, the Naval Weapons Station Dental Clinic was integrated into the Naval Hospital during a Change of Charge ceremony on October 22, 2004, well ahead of the mandated deadline as a result of the hard work and team focus of both Hospital and Dental Clinic staff members.

On January 12, 2007, the Naval Hospital Charleston publicly announced the official change of name from Naval Hospital Charleston to Naval Health Clinic Charleston to accurately reflect the ambulatory care mission which they have provided since 1998.

The Naval Health Clinic Charleston would consolidate their services into a modern, two story ambulatory clinic and share the facility and some of its services with the Ralph H. Johnson Veteran's Administration Medical Center, which will operate a Community Based Outpatient Clinic from the facility. The ground breaking for the new clinic was scheduled for March 23, 2007, with an estimated completion date and official move in date of late September 2010.

The Naval Health Clinic Charleston currently renders quality health services for approximately 12,000 enrollees from these buildings located at the Naval Weapons Station in Goose Creek to better serve our beneficiaries in that strategic location:

The Branch Medical Clinic offers family medicine and ancillary services.

At Naval Nuclear Power Training Command (NNPTC), the Naval Health Clinic Charleston provides a sick call clinic for 5000 students and 500 faculty.

The Branch Wellness clinic provides health promotion classes and health beneficiary consultation.

On September 1, 2010, the long-awaited move to the new consolidated Joint VA and Naval Health Clinic commenced. The new site is a 188,000-square-foot (17,500 m^{2}), state-of-the-art layout. It offers a drive-through pharmacy and a variety of other health care upgrades for active duty service members, their family members, retirees and veterans. It is "ambulatory", or for "walk-in, walk-out" services.

With this move, the Naval Weapons Station Branch Medical Clinic and the NNPTC sick call clinic were combined with the Naval Health Clinic operations moving from the Rivers Avenue location, placing all of Naval Health Clinic Charleston at one location.
