= Naval Nuclear Power Training Command =

- Founded: 1993; 33 years ago
- Allegiance: United States of America
- Branch: United States Navy
- Type: Training
- Size: 500 staff 2,500 students
- Part of: Naval Sea Systems Command (NAVSEA); National Nuclear Security Administration (NNSA)
- Campus: Naval Support Activity Charleston; Goose Creek; South Carolina, U.S.
- Mottos: Knowledge, Integrity, Excellence
- Website: www.navsea.navy.mil/Home/NNPTC/

Commanders
- Commanding Officer: CAPT Larry J. Arbuckle, USN
- Executive Officer: CDR Dean R. Dobransky, USN
- Command Master Chief: ETNCM Anthony T. Mazza, USN

The Naval Nuclear Power Training Command (NNPTC) is a program element of the Naval Nuclear Propulsion Program and is responsible for educating enlisted and commissioned personnel of the US nuclear naval program. NNPTC's mission is to train officer and enlisted students in science and engineering fundamental to the design, operation, and maintenance of naval nuclear propulsion plants. NNPTC houses Nuclear Field "A" School and Naval Nuclear Power School. These two schools were formerly independent entities run by separate commanding officers and structures. NNPTC was created in 1993 to streamline the command structures of both schools, with each school ultimately reporting to a single commanding officer of NNPTC.

== History of locations and commanding officers ==
NNPTC was originally created when the two schools were located at the former Naval Training Center Orlando (Florida). The NNPTC's first commanding officer was Captain Steven G. Slaton (USN Ret), who was the commanding officer of Nuclear Field "A" School when NNPTC was created in 1993. The current commanding officer is Captain Larry J. Arbuckle.

When NNPTC graduated its final class in Orlando, in December 1998, the organization moved to Naval Weapons Station Charleston in Goose Creek, South Carolina, which is a suburban community of Charleston, South Carolina.

== Time capsule ==
In 1989, NNPTC buried a time capsule on their grounds. On September 22, 2014, it was dug up to reveal its contents: an old NNPTC command ball cap, a command name tape, multiple newspapers from that day, and other unidentified items.

== Crash Display ==
At the intersection of Red Bank Road outside the base entrance is a display of a wrecked vehicle, intended to discourage drunk driving. The display was installed sometime after November 2024 according to Google street view. Alongside the vehicle is a sign reading, "Drunk driving kills. Get a ride, save a life." The vehicle and sign have been removed as of September 10, 2026.

== See also ==
- Naval Nuclear Propulsion Program
- Naval Nuclear Power School
