= Naval Consolidated Brig, Charleston =

US Navy military prison in Charleston, South Carolina

U.S. Naval Consolidated Brig, Charleston
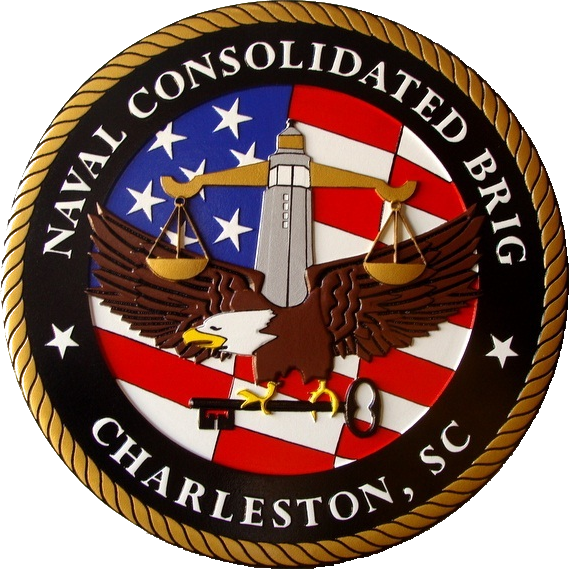
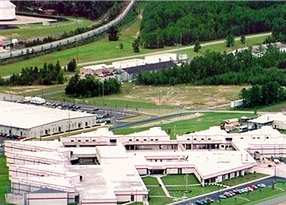
- Seal of U.S. Naval Consolidated Brig, Charleston Aerial view of U.S. Naval Consolidated Brig, Charleston
- Interactive map of U.S. Naval Consolidated Brig, Charleston
- Location: 32°54′34.9″N 79°58′35.4″W
- Security class: Medium

The U.S. Naval Consolidated Brig, Charleston (NAVCONBRIG CHASN), is a medium security U.S. military prison. The brig, Building #3107, is located in the south annex of Joint Base Charleston in the city of Hanahan, South Carolina.

== History ==
The Naval Weapons Station with indication of the location of Navconbrig Charleston

The Brig was commissioned on November 30, 1989 and accepted its first prisoners in January 1990. It has 400 cells and can hold 288 inmates. It houses prisoners from all branches of the United States Armed Forces and conducts the Navy's Violent Offender Treatment Program. It has been accredited by the American Correctional Association twelve times: 1992, 1995, 1998, 2001, 2004, 2007, 2010, 2013, 2016, 2019, 2022, and 2025; receiving 100% compliance on each correctional standard.

The brig recently housed several enemy combatants, including Yasser Hamdi, José Padilla and Ali Saleh Kahlah al-Marri. Al-Marri was the last of the three to remain at the brig, being transferred to a civilian prison after he pleaded guilty in 2009.

In October 2008 91 pages of memos drafted in 2002 by an officer at the brig became public. The memos indicate that officers were concerned that the isolation and lack of stimuli were driving Hamdi, Padilla and Al-Marri insane.

On October 12, 2011, the Charleston Post and Courier reported on memos from E.P. Giambastiani to Charles Stimson Deputy Assistant Secretary of Defense for Detainee Affairs, requesting that Hamdi, Padilla and al Marri be transferred to Guantanamo. The memos were from 2005. Giambastiani's request was declined. The memos were released to the Post and Courier in response to a Freedom of Information Act request, filed eight years previously, for information about changes to the role of the prison triggered by al Qaeda's attacks on September 11, 2001. They wrote that when the DoD's response was finally received, "A Pentagon official apologized but gave no explanation for the long delay."
