= 315th Operations Group =

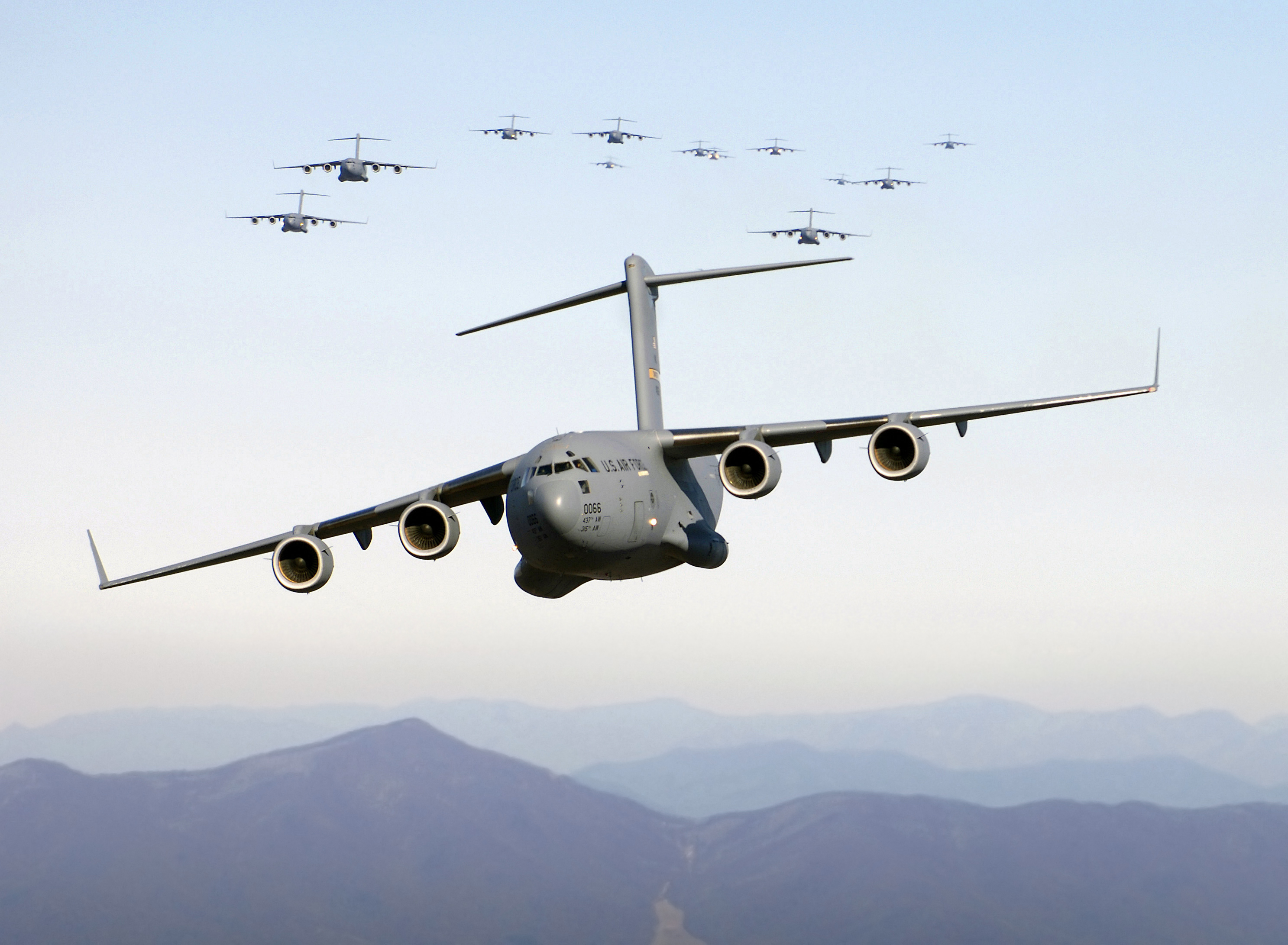
- C-17 Globemaster IIIs of the 315th Operations Group
- Active: 1942–1945; 1947–1948; 1952–1955; 1962–1966; 1992–present
- Country: United States
- Branch: United States Air Force
- Role: Airlift
- Part of: Air Force Reserve Command
- Garrison/HQ: Charleston Air Force Base
- Motto(s): Adveniam Latin I Will Arrive
- Engagements: European Theater of Operations Korean War Vietnam War
- Decorations: Distinguished Unit Citation; Air Force Outstanding Unit Award with Combat "V" Device; Air Force Outstanding Unit Award; Republic of Korea Presidential Unit Citation

Commanders
- Current commander: Colonel Christine L. Van Weezendonk

Insignia
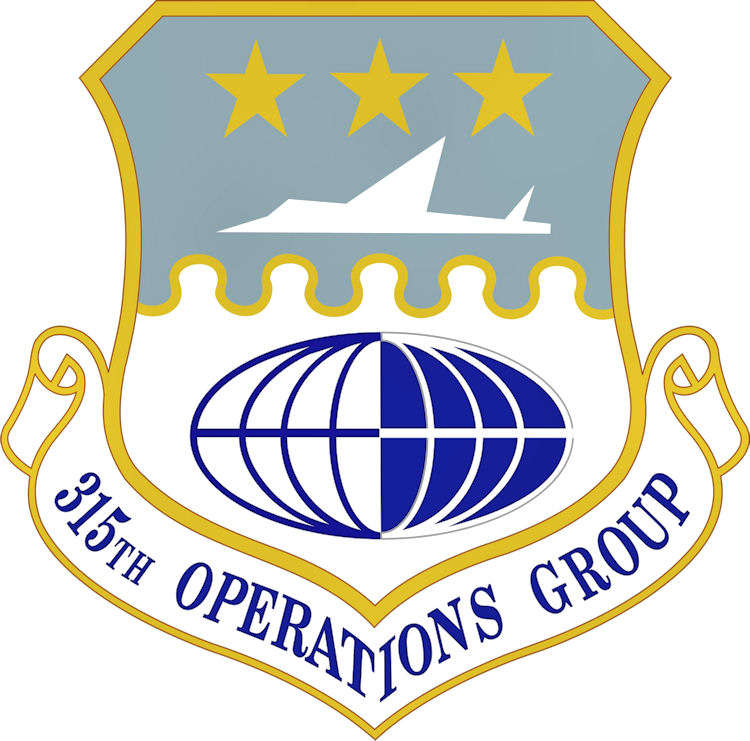
- 315th Operations Group emblem (Note: The wing uses the 315th Wing emblem with the group designation on the scroll. Bailey, Factsheet, 315 Operations Group.)

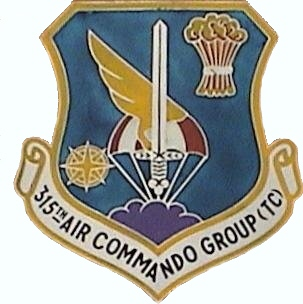
- 315th Air Commando Group emblem

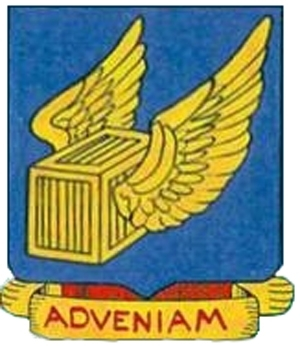
- 315th Troop Carrier Group emblem (approved 22 May 1942)

The 315th Operations Group is a United States Air Force Reserve unit assigned to the 315th Airlift Wing. The unit is stationed at Charleston Air Force Base, South Carolina. The 315th Group controls all operational McDonnell Douglas C-17 Globemaster III flying squadrons of the 315th Airlift Wing. It was activated in 1992, when Air Force Reserve Command implemented the Objective Wing organization.

The unit was first activated during World War II as the 315th Troop Carrier Group, a Douglas C-47 Skytrain transport unit assigned to IX Troop Carrier Command in Western Europe. The group received a Distinguished Unit Citation for its combat parachute infantry drops during the Invasion of France (Operation Overlord); the airborne invasion of the Netherlands (Operation Market-Garden); and the airborne crossing of the Rhine River (Operation Varsity).

The group was reactivated in Japan during the Korean War in 1952, replacing the 437th Troop Carrier Group, a reserve unit that had been called to active duty for the war, when the 437th was returned to reserve status. It was inactivated three years later, when US flying operations at Brady Air Base ended. The group again was activated in 1962, when it replaced the Combat Cargo Group, Provisional 6492d in managing airlift operations during the Vietnam War. After being redesignated the 315th Air Commando Group in 1965, the group was inactivated and replaced by the larger 315th Air Commando Wing in 1966, when airlift operations in Vietnam expanded.

== Units ==
The 315th Operations Group includes the following units.

- 315th Operations Support Squadron
- 300th Airlift Squadron
- 317th Airlift Squadron
- 701st Airlift Squadron
- 315th Aeromedical Evacuation Squadron
- 315th Contingency Response Flight
- 4th Combat Camera Squadron

== History ==
=== World War II ===
==== Activation and initial training ====
The group was constituted as the 315th Transport Group on 2 February 1942 and activated at Olmsted Field, Pennsylvania twelve days later as part of Air Service Command. Its original elements were the 33d, 34th and 35th Transport Squadrons. One month later, the 6th Transport Squadron at Camp Williams, Wisconsin was added to the group. In April, the group became part of I Troop Carrier Command and began training with Douglas C-47 Skytrain and Douglas C-53 Skytrooper aircraft. (Note: Bailey lists the 32d Transport Squadron, rather than the 33d Transport Squadron as assigned to the group in an apparent typographical error. The 32d Squadron was assigned to the 314th Transport Group. Compare Maurer, Combat Squadrons, pp. 159–160, 163–164.)

In June, the 315th moved to Bowman Field, Kentucky, an I Troop Carrier Command base. The move to Bowman was accompanied by a shuffling of assigned units. The 6th Squadron in Wisconsin was reassigned, as was the 35th, which moved to Westover Field to prepare for an early move overseas. Their place was taken by the 43d Transport Squadron, which was activated at Bowman and the 54th Transport Squadron, which moved to Bowman a few days after its activation at Hamilton Field. The group and its squadrons became Troop Carrier units in July. Before the group departed for England upon completing its training in October, the 33d Squadron was detached from the group in September, with most of its elements serving in New Caledonia, although it remained assigned to the group for two more months. The 54th Squadron was moved to reinforce Eleventh Air Force in Alaska, and only the 34th and 43d Squadrons moved with the group to Europe.

To replace the lost squadrons, the 61st Troop Carrier Squadron was activated at Bowman Field in October and the 62d Troop Carrier Squadron at Sedalia Army Air Field in December 1942, However these squadrons remained in the United States to be trained and were reassigned in March 1943 without ever joining the wing.

==== Combat in the European Theater ====
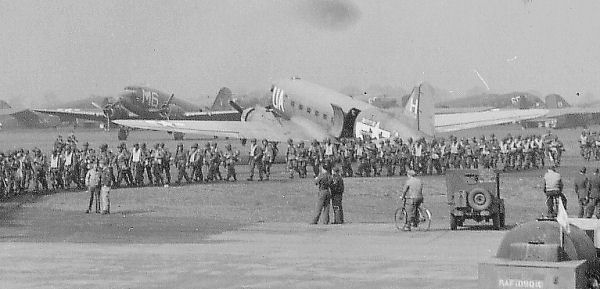
C-47s of the group at Spanhoe in 1944

While flying the North Atlantic ferry route, the air echelon encountered bad winter weather, causing it to remain in Greenland for about a month. While there it searched for missing aircraft and dropped supplies to downed crews. The ground echelon arrived in England in November 1942 for service with Eighth Air Force.

After the air and ground echelons were united in December, the group began ferrying cargo in the British Isles and training with airborne troops and gliders. In May 1943 a detachment comprising almost all the group aircraft, aircrews, and most support personnel, deployed to North Africa to support Twelfth Air Force and other Mediterranean Theater of Operations organizations during Operation Husky, the invasions of Sicily and Operation Avalanche, the invasion of Italy. Although the group did not participate in the airborne phase of the invasions, it did support those operations by transporting supplies in the theater. In March 1944 the detachment returned to England and rejoined the group, which had been reassigned to the Ninth Air Force in October 1943.

On 7 February 1944, the group moved to RAF Spanhoe. It became part of the 52d Troop Carrier Wing of IX Troop Carrier Command. The group prepared for the invasion of the Continent. As part of its preparation, the group was brought up to full strength for the first time since arriving in England in April 1944, when the 309th and 310th Troop Carrier Squadrons were assigned to the group shortly after arriving in theater. In April the group began formation flying training and a month later began paratroop-dropping exercises. The group continued training until 26 May. Operating alongside the 316th Troop Carrier Group for the Normandy landings, 47 aircraft of the 315th Group dropped 844 paratroops of the 505th Parachute Infantry Regiment's Headquarters and 1st Battalion at Drop Zone O, near Sainte-Mère-Église early on 6 June. The group earned a Distinguished Unit Citation for its actions. The group also dropped 82d Airborne Division commander Matthew Ridgway and his staff. During the drop, the group did not lose any planes as German anti-aircraft fire was sporadic and ineffectual.

The group dropped paratroops of the 82d Airborne Division's 504th Parachute Infantry Regiment near Overasselt on 17 September 1944, losing one plane. The mission was part of Operation Market Garden, a series of Allied airborne attacks in the Netherlands. The group flew reinforcement missions on succeeding days. On 18 September, 27 aircraft in two serials of the group and 36 aircraft from the 314th Troop Carrier Group dropped paratroopers of the British 4th Parachute Brigade at Drop Zone Y on Ginkel Heath. Several aircraft were lost to flak. On 21 September, the 314th and 315th Groups dropped elements of the 1st Polish Parachute Brigade near Driel, after numerous weather-caused delays. Five aircraft from the group were lost in the drop. On 23 September, the group dropped without loss the 560-strong remainder of the 1st Polish Parachute Brigade on Drop Zone O near Overasselt. The group landed at Grave on 26 September to unload paratroops and supplies. It airlifted gasoline and other critical supplies to Antwerp and Liège during the Battle of the Bulge in December 1944 and January 1945.

For Operation Varsity, the Allied airborne assault across the Rhine in March 1945, the group staged out of RAF Boreham as a result of the need for shorter flying distances. The group released British paratroops of the 5th Parachute Brigade near Wesel on 24 March. During the operation, the group suffered its heaviest losses of the war, losing nineteen aircraft, with another 36 badly damaged. Following each airborne operation, the group resumed transport activities, hauling cargo and evacuating wounded personnel. The group moved to France in April 1945.

The group transported cargo and evacuated released allied prisoners of war until after V-E Day. It moved to Trinidad in May 1945 and transported troops returning to the US. The group was inactivated on 31 July 1945.

=== Cold War ===
The group was activated at Langley Field on 19 May 1947, but was not manned or equipped, and was inactivated again on 10 September 1948.

=== Korean War ===
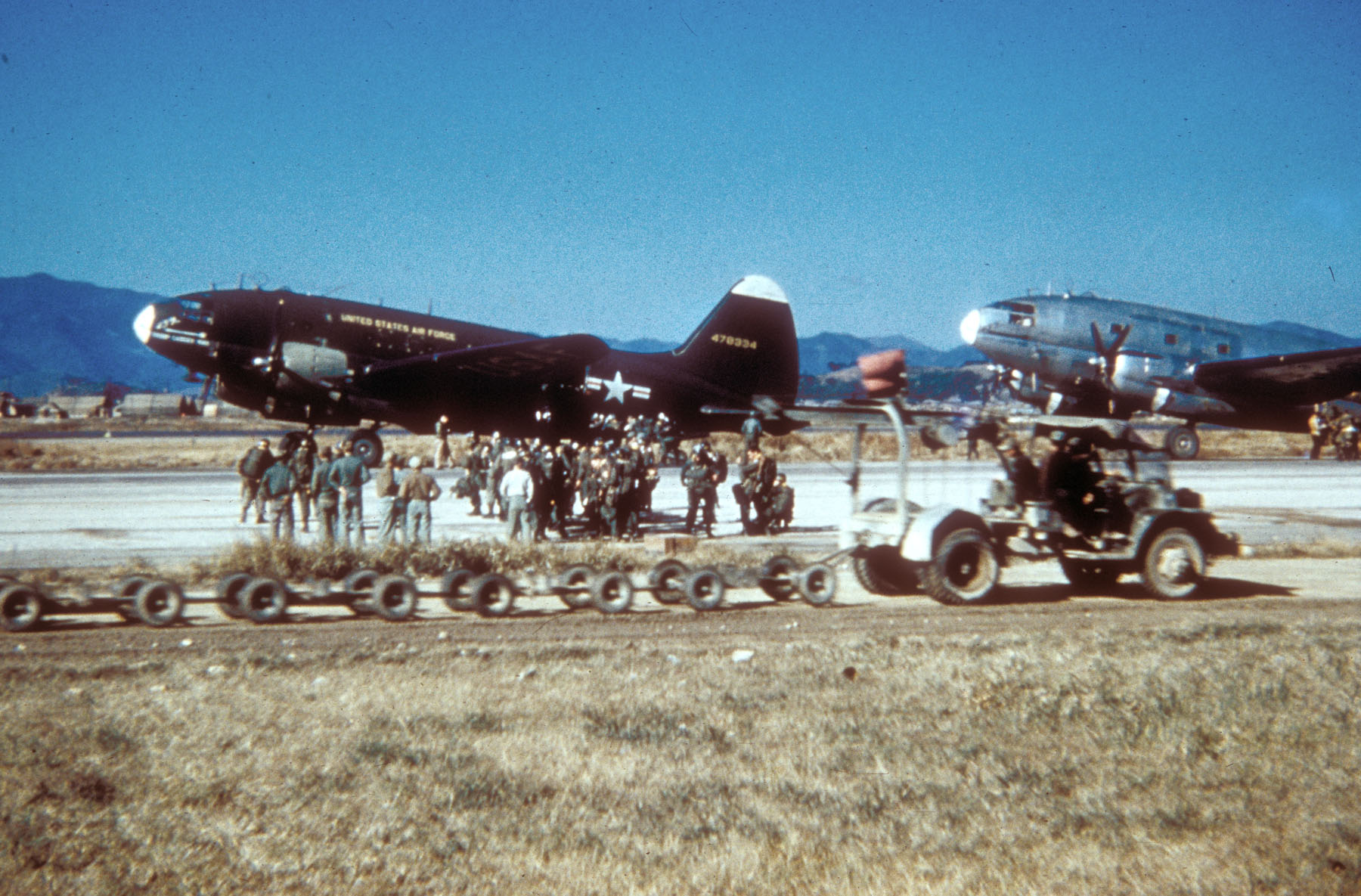
C-46Ds in Korea

The group was reactivated in Japan at Brady Air Base on 10 June 1952 after being redesignated as the 315th Troop Carrier Group, Medium. It was assigned to the Far East Forces, for duty during the Korean War. The group took over the Curtiss C-46 Commando transports of the 437th Troop Carrier Group, a reserve unit that had been called up for the war and was being inactivated. The group flew troop and cargo airlift and airdrop, leaflet drops, spray missions, air evacuation, search and rescue, and other aerial missions between Japan and Korea. During US Army exercises in Japan between 1952 and 1953, it transported units. In March 1953, all C-119s in the theater were grounded as a result of malfunctioning propellers and the group's C-46s were made responsible for moving all personnel between southern Japan and Korea up to the end of the war. The group airlifted the 187th Airborne Regimental Combat Team along with other XVI Corps units to Korea in June and July 1953. For its actions, the group received the Republic of Korea Presidential Unit Citation. It remained in the Far East after the war to fly transport missions and paratroop training flights. The group flew missions in Japan, Korea, French Indo-China, and other points until December 1954. The group was inactivated in Japan on 18 January 1955.

=== Vietnam War ===
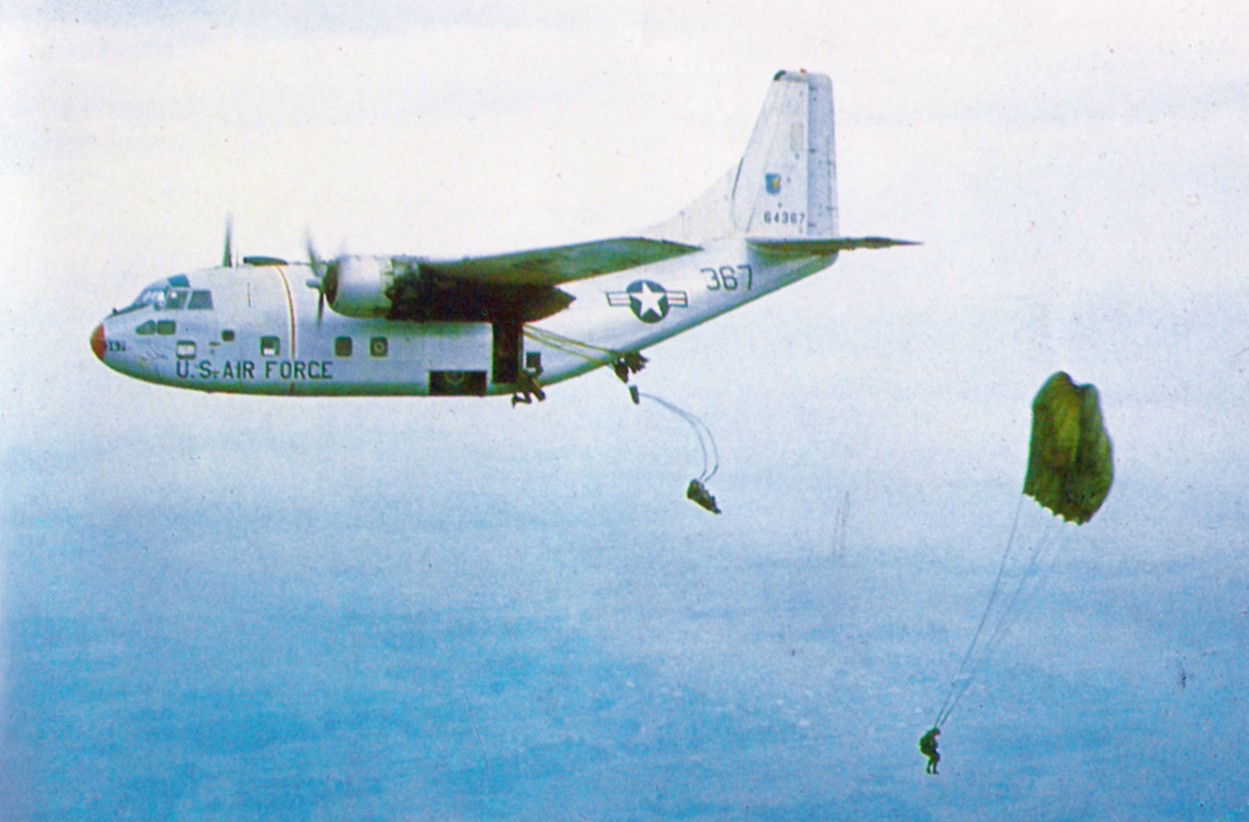
Vietnamese paratroopers jump from a group C-123B

The group was organized at Tan Son Nhut Airport, Vietnam in December 1962 as the 315th Troop Carrier Group, Assault. It replaced the Combat Cargo Group, Provisional, 6492d at Tan Son Nhut. The group was initially composed of a provisional transport squadron, an aerial port squadron and a maintenance squadron and was part of the 315th Air Division. Its flying squadron, the Tactical Air Force Transport Squadron, Provisional, 2, was the successor to Operation Mule Train, which had been providing logistics support for US and Vietnamese military elements since January. The provisional squadron was manned primarily by deployed crews from the 464th Troop Carrier Wing's 346th Troop Carrier Squadron, from Pope Air Force Base, North Carolina.

The group exercised control over USAF airlift resources in Vietnam, primarily flying the Fairchild C-123B Provider. It also provided combat evaluation of YC-123 aircraft between February and April 1963. By April 1963, operations had expanded to the point that the 464th Wing deployed an entire squadron, the 777th Troop Carrier Squadron, to Da Nang Air Base, and it was attached to the 315th Group. In July 1963, operations had expanded further, and the group was assigned permanent squadrons. On the 1st, the 777th Squadron was assigned to the group and joined by a second squadron from the 464th Wing, the 778th. A week later, the 2d was discontinued, while the 777th and 778th were returned to the 464th Wing on paper, and their personnel and equipment were transferred to the newly activated 309th, 310th and 311th Troop Carrier Squadrons.

The commander of the group was also the director of the Southeast Asia Airlift System and maintained an airlift control officer in Military Assistance Command Vietnam (MACV)'s air operations center. The system managed "common use" airlift in both Vietnam and Thailand. Under this system, the group controlled one of the two companies of US Army de Havilland Canada CV-2 Caribou aircraft located in Vietnam between July and December 1963. (Note: MACV had agreed to place both companies under the central control of the group. However, Pacific Command directed that company be tasked with immediate support of Army corps commanders to take advantage of the Caribou's unique STOL capability. Futrell, p. 167.) In the fall of 1963 MACV directed a reduction of 1000 personnel in Vietnam, which included the elimination of the 61st Aviation Company and its Caribous. In addition to airlift resources in Vietnam, two Bristol 170 transports of the Royal New Zealand Air Force, located in Thailand also fell within the system's control. The fall of 1963 also saw the group's C-123s beginning to augment Vietnamese Air Force C-47s on flare drop missions, using a box on the ramp of their C-123s that was fabricated by the group's maintenance men to dispense the flares. In the first half of 1964, group Providers flew 239 night flare sorties.

Despite planned drawdowns in other areas in 1964, (Note: Both squadrons at Pleiku Air Base, the 1st Air Commando Squadron and the 19th Tactical Air Support Squadron were to turn their planes over to the VNAF, but these plans, too, changed. Futrell, pp. 235–240.) American commanders in Vietnam were requesting more airlift capability. In August, RAAF Transport Flight Vietnam, a Royal Australian Air Force CV-2 detachment at Vung Tau Airport, arrived and was placed under the group's control. In September, the Army also moved an additional Caribou company into the country, but these transports remained outside the control of the group. The group had conducted inspections of its C-123s in May that disclosed that all 37 aircraft that had been in country since 1962 showed visible damage, and 11 required major repair. By October, however, sufficient additional C-123s had been withdrawn from Air Force Reserve units in the United States to form a fourth Provider squadron, the 19th Air Commando Squadron. In December, half of the 310th Troop Carrier Squadron moved to Nha Trang Air Base to replace C-47s that had been operating from that base. The remainder of the squadron would follow in June 1965.

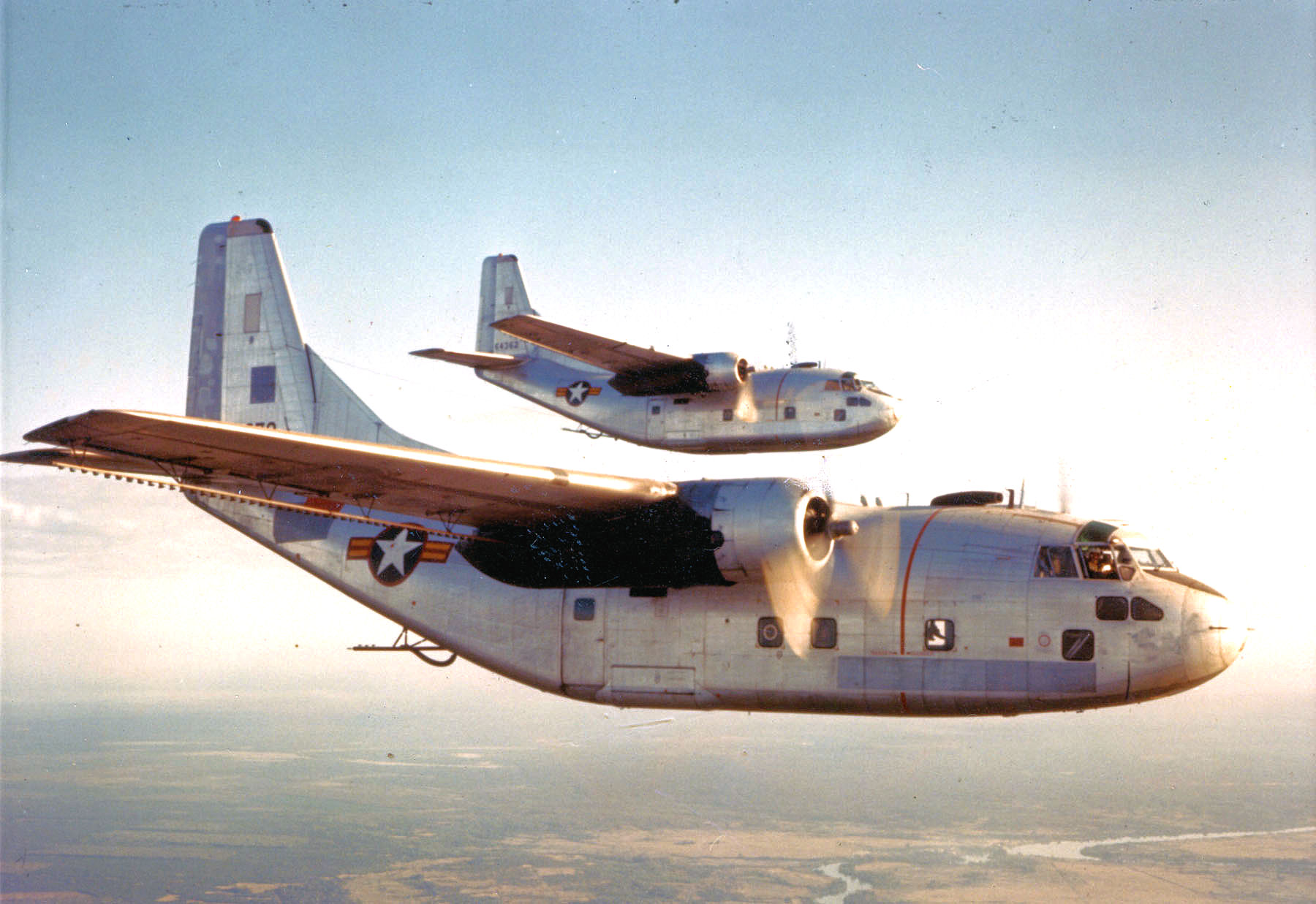
Ranch Hand UC-123B Providers with South Vietnamese markings

Until July 1964, the UC-123Bs of Operation Ranch Hand, spraying defoliants, had operated with Tactical Air Command crews on temporary duty. At that time. the three planes were transferred to the group on permanent status, becoming Detachment 1, 315th Troop Carrier Group. Shortly after the transfer, Ranch Hand began crop destruction missions in addition to the defoliation missions it had flown since 1962.

The group began 1965 by airlifting the Army of the Republic of Vietnam (ARVN) 1st and 3d Airborne Battalions to Vung Tau, where ARVN forces were engaged in a battle with Viet Cong units. Later that month, the group's Ranch Hand aircraft began a massive defoliation program in War Zone D designed to expose a main Viet Cong base by eliminating cover over 48 square miles of forest. On 8 March, the group was redesignated the 315th Air Commando Group. The group began to operate deployed Lockheed C-130 Hercules transports, which had more cargo capacity than the Provider, in 1965. The group was inactivated in March 1966 and its flying squadrons were transferred to the 315th Air Commando Wing, which was activated in its place.

=== Reserve associate unit ===
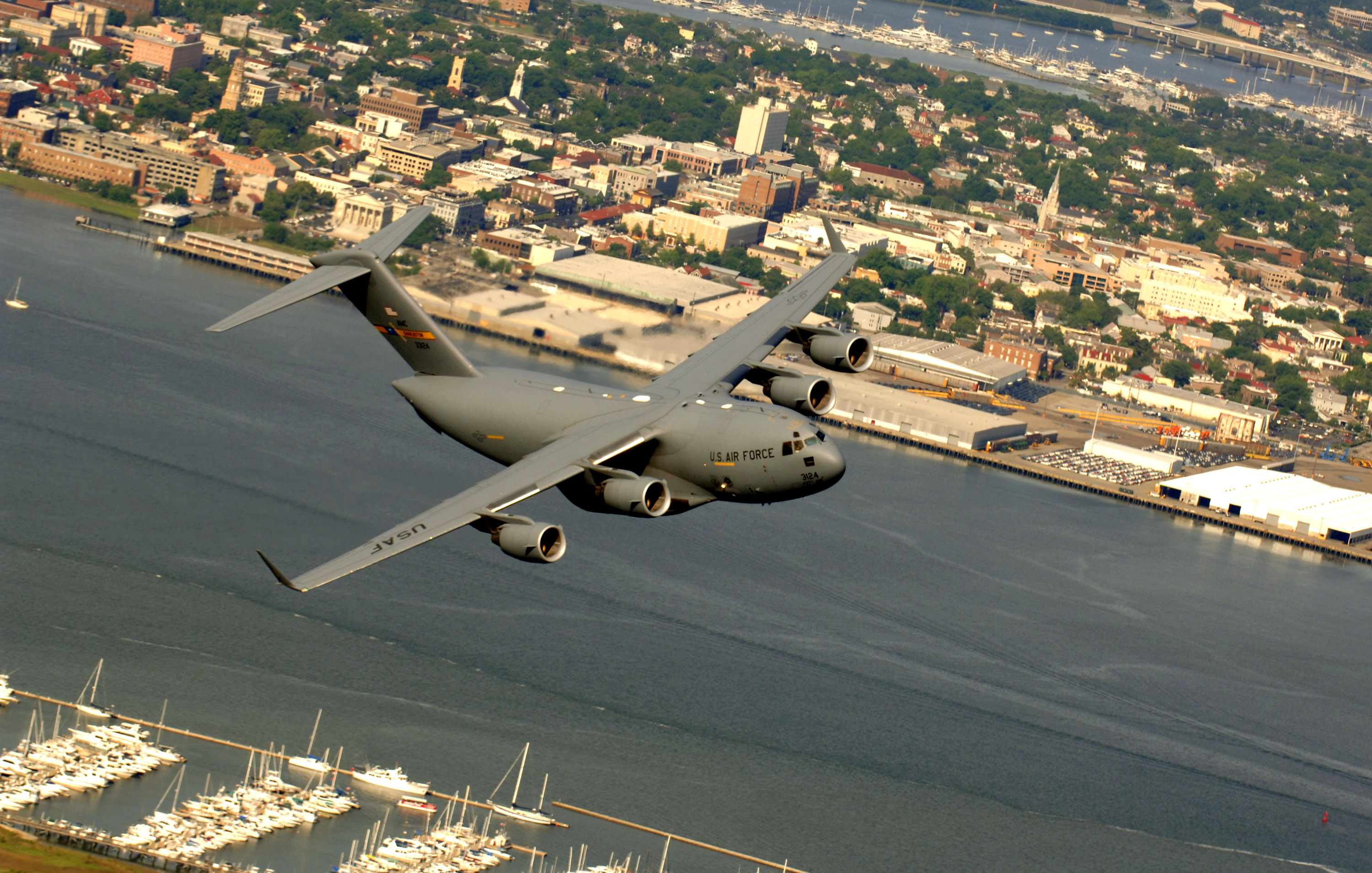
A group C-17 Globemaster III flies over downtown Charleston

Since 1968, the Air Force Reserve had stationed associate units at Charleston Air Force Base, where the 315th Military Airlift Wing operated the Lockheed C-141 Starlifters of the regular Air Force 437th Military Airlift Wing In August 1992, Air Force Reserve Command implemented the Objective Wing organization for its flying units and the group was activated as the 315th Operations Group to control the airlift operations of the 315th Wing. The group continued to operate the Lockheed C-141 Starlifter until around 2000, flying contingency operation, humanitarian airlift missions, and exercises worldwide.

In 1993, the 315th became the first Air Force Reserve group to fly the C-17 Globemaster III. It took part in the first US-Russian joint military exercise in 1994.

Since November 2022, the group has been commanded by Lieutenant Colonel Diane Patton.

== Lineage ==
- Established as the 315th Transport Group on 2 February 1942

Activated on 14 February 1942
Redesignated 315th Troop Carrier Group on 4 July 1942
Inactivated on 31 July 1945

- Activated on 19 May 1947

Inactivated on 10 September 1948

- Redesignated 315th Troop Carrier Group, Medium on 23 May 1952

Activated on 10 June 1952
Inactivated on 18 January 1955

- Redesignated 315th Troop Carrier Group, Assault and activated on 9 November 1962 (not organized)

Organized on 8 December 1962
Redesignated 315th Air Commando Group, Troop Carrier on 8 March 1965
Discontinued and inactivated on 8 March 1966
Redesignated 315th Military Airlift Group on 31 July 1985 (Remained inactive)

- Redesignated 315th Operations Group on 1 August 1992

Activated in the reserve on 1 August 1992

=== Assignments ===
- Air Service Command, 14 February 1942
- 50th Transport Wing, 31 March 1942
- 52d Transport Wing (later 52d Troop Carrier Wing), 20 June 1942
- VIII Air Support Command, c. 29 November 1942 (attached to 1 Fighter Division (Provisional), 30 August – 15 October 1943)
- 50th Troop Carrier Wing, 16 October 1943
- 52d Troop Carrier Wing, 18 February 1944
- Caribbean Wing, Air Transport Command, 15 May – 31 July 1945
- Tactical Air Command, 19 May 1947 – 10 September 1948
- 315th Troop Carrier Wing, 10 June 1952 – 18 January 1955
- Pacific Air Forces, 9 November 1962 (not organized)
- 315th Air Division, 8 December 1962 – 8 March 1966 (attached to 2d Air Division)
- 315th Airlift Wing, 1 August 1992 – present

=== Components ===
World War II

- 6th Transport Squadron: c. 23 March – June 1942
- 33d Transport Squadron (later 32d Troop Carrier Squadron): 14 February – 11 November 1942 (detached after 27 September 1942)
- 34th Transport Squadron (later 34th Troop Carrier Squadron): 14 February 1942 – 31 July 1945
- 35th Transport Squadron: 14 February – 8 June 1942
- 43d Transport Squadron (later 43d Troop Carrier Squadron): 15 June 1942 – 31 July 1945
- 54th Transport Squadron (later 54th Troop Carrier Squadron): 11 June – 22 October 1942 (Note: Bailey indicates the squadron was detached, but Maurer and Robertson both indicate it was not. Maurer, Combat Squadrons, pp. 224–225; Robertson, Patsy (16 October 2010). "Factsheet 54 Air Refueling Squadron (AETC)". Air Force Historical Research Agency.)
- 61st Troop Carrier Squadron: 26 October 1942 – 14 March 1943 (attached to 314th Troop Carrier Group)
- 62d Troop Carrier Squadron: 5 December 1942 – 14 March 1943 (attached to 89th Troop Carrier Group)
- 309th Troop Carrier Squadron: 26 April 1944 – 31 July 1945
- 310th Troop Carrier Squadron: 26 April 1944 – 31 July 1945

Cold War

- 34th Troop Carrier Squadron: 19 May 1947 – 10 September 1948
- 43d Troop Carrier Squadron: 19 May 1947 – 10 September 1948

Korean War

- 19th Troop Carrier Squadron: 10 June 1952 – 18 January 1955
- 34th Troop Carrier Squadron: 10 June 1952 – 18 January 1955
- 43d Troop Carrier Squadron: 10 June 1952 – 18 January 1955
- 344th Troop Carrier Squadron: 10 June 1952 – 18 January 1955 (detached 14 December 1952 – 13 October 1953)

Vietnam War

- Tactical Air Force Transport Squadron, Provisional, 2: attached 8 December 1962 – 8 July 1963
- 8th Aerial Port Squadron: 8 December 1962 – 8 March 1966
- 19th Air Commando Squadron: 8 October 1964 – 8 March 1966
- 309th Troop Carrier Squadron (later 309th Air Commando Squadron): 1 July 1963 – 8 March 1966
- 310th Troop Carrier Squadron (later 310th Air Commando Squadron): 8 July 1963 – 8 March 1966
- 311th Troop Carrier Squadron (later 311th Air Commando Squadron): 8 July 1963 – 8 March 1966
- 315th Consolidated Aircraft Maintenance Squadron: 8 December 1962 – 22 August 1969
- 777th Troop Carrier Squadron: attached 17 April – 30 June 1963, assigned 1 – 8 July 1963
- 778th Troop Carrier Squadron: 1 – 8 July 1963

Air Force Reserves

- 38th Aerial Port Squadron, 1 October 1982 – 1 October 2002
- 31st Aeromedical Evacuation Squadron: 1 August 1992– 1 October 1994
- 300th Airlift Squadron: 1 August 1992 – present
- 317th Airlift Squadron: 1 August 1992 – present
- 701st Airlift Squadron: 1 August 1992 – present
- 707th Airlift Squadron: 1 August 1992 – 1 July 2000
- 315th Operations Support Squadron (later 315th Operations Support Flight, 315th Operations Support Squadron): 1 August 1992 – present
- 315th Aeromedical Evacuation Squadron: 1 October 1994 – present
- 315th Airlift Control Flight: 1 August 1992 – present
- 4th Combat Camera Squadron: 3 March 2017 – present

=== Stations ===
- Olmsted Field, Pennsylvania, 14 February 1942
- Bowman Field, Kentucky, 18 June 1942
- Florence Army Air Field, South Carolina, 4 August – October 1942
- RAF Aldermaston (AAF-467), England, December 1942
- RAF Welford (AAF-474), England, 6 November 1943
- RAF Spanhoe (AAF-493), England, 7 February 1944
- Amiens Airfield (B-48), France, 6 April – 13 May 1945
- Waller Field, Trinidad, c. 24 May – 31 July 1945
- Langley Field (later Langley Air Force Base), Virginia, 19 May 1947 – 10 September 1948
- Brady Air Base, Japan, 10 June 1952 – 18 January 1955
- Tan Son Nhut Air Base, South Vietnam, 8 December 1962 – 8 March 1966
- Charleston Air Force Base, South Carolina, 1 August 1992–present

=== Aircraft ===
- Primarily Douglas C-47 Skytrain, 1942–1945

Included Lockheed C-60 Lodestar, 1942
Douglas C-53 Skytrooper, 1942, 1944–1945
Curtiss C-46 Commando, 1945

- Curtiss C-46 Commando, 1952–1955.
- Primarily Fairchild C-123B Provider, 1962–1966

Fairchild YC-123, 1963
Fairchild HUC-123B, 1964–1965
Fairchild UC-123B, 1965–1966;
de Havilland Canada CV-2 Caribou, 1963, 1964–1966
Lockheed C-130 Hercules, 1965–1966

- Lockheed C-141 Starlifter, 1992-c. 2000
- McDonnell Douglas C-17 Globemaster III, 1993–present
