= 315th Airlift Wing =

United States Air Force Reserve wing

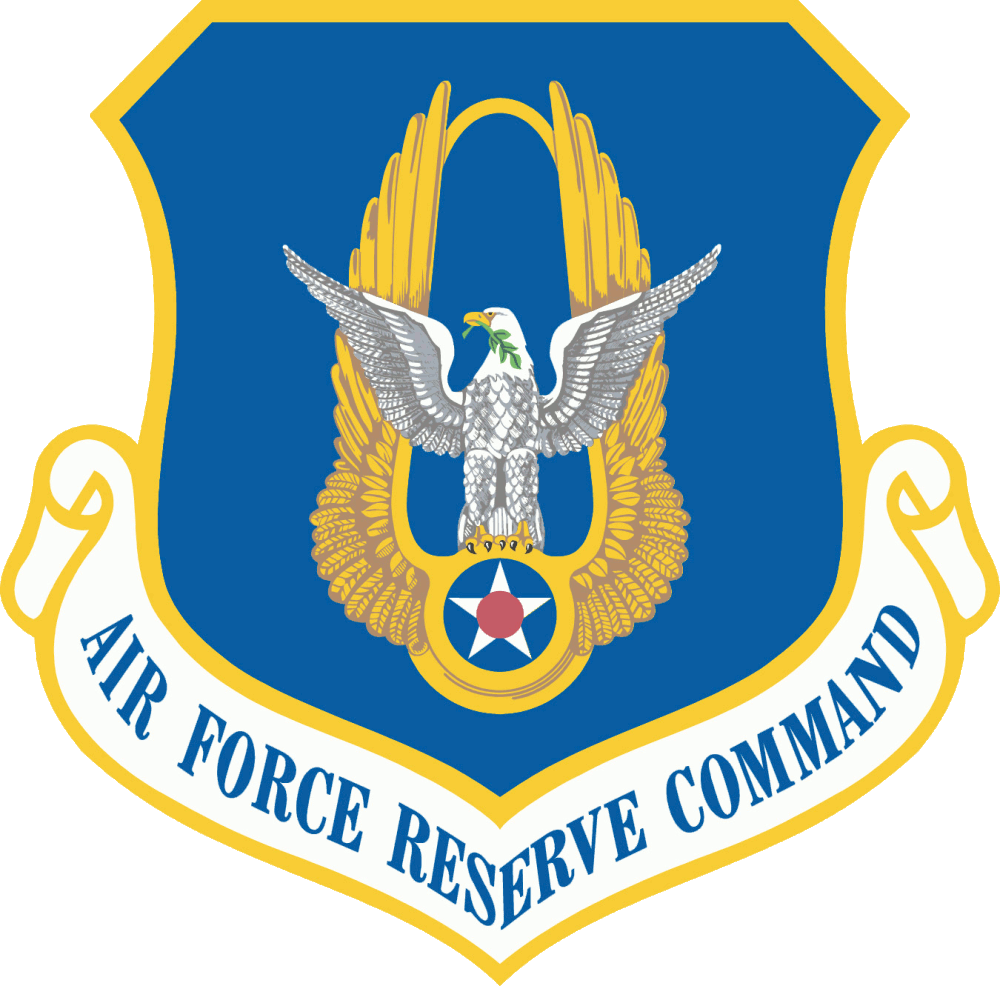
315th Airlift Wing

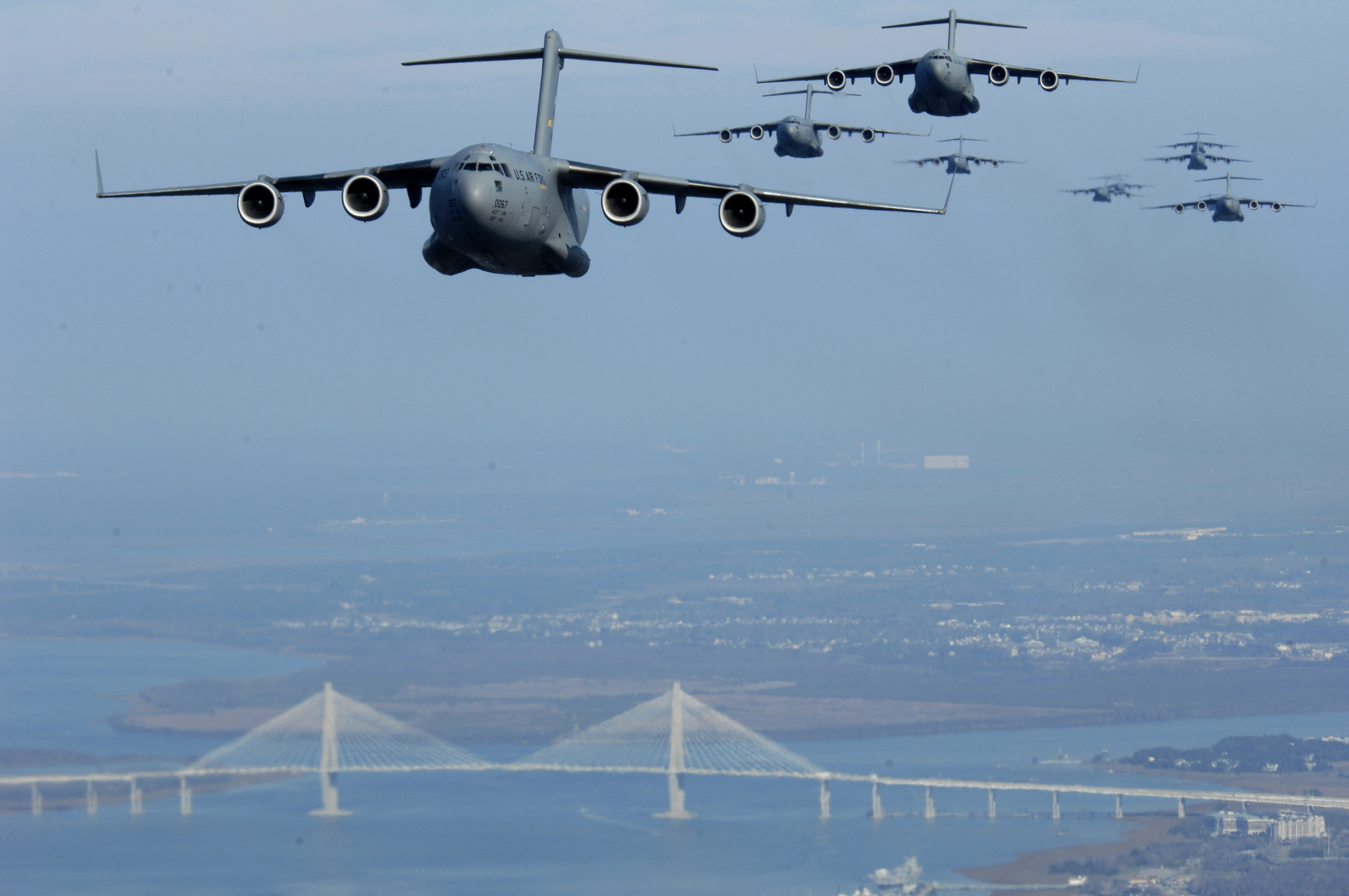
- 315th Airlift Wing C-17 Globemaster IIIs over the Arthur Ravenel Bridge, Charleston, S.C.
- Active: 1952–1955; 1966–1972; 1973–present
- Country: United States
- Branch: United States Air Force
- Role: Airlift
- Part of: Air Force Reserve Command
- Garrison/HQ: Joint Base Lindsey Graham
- Motto: Advenium (Latin for 'I Will Come')
- Engagements: European Theater of Operations; Korean War; Vietnam War
- Decorations: Distinguished Unit Citation; Presidential Unit Citation; Air Force Outstanding Unit Award with Combat "V" Device; Republic of Korea Presidential Unit Citation; Republic of Vietnam Gallantry Cross with Palm
- Website: 315aw.afrc.af.mil/

Commanders
- Current commander: Colonel Edward “Ed” G. Yeash III
- Vice Commander: Colonel Alan J. Partridge
- Command Chief: Chief Master Sergeant Chima O. Ellis

Insignia
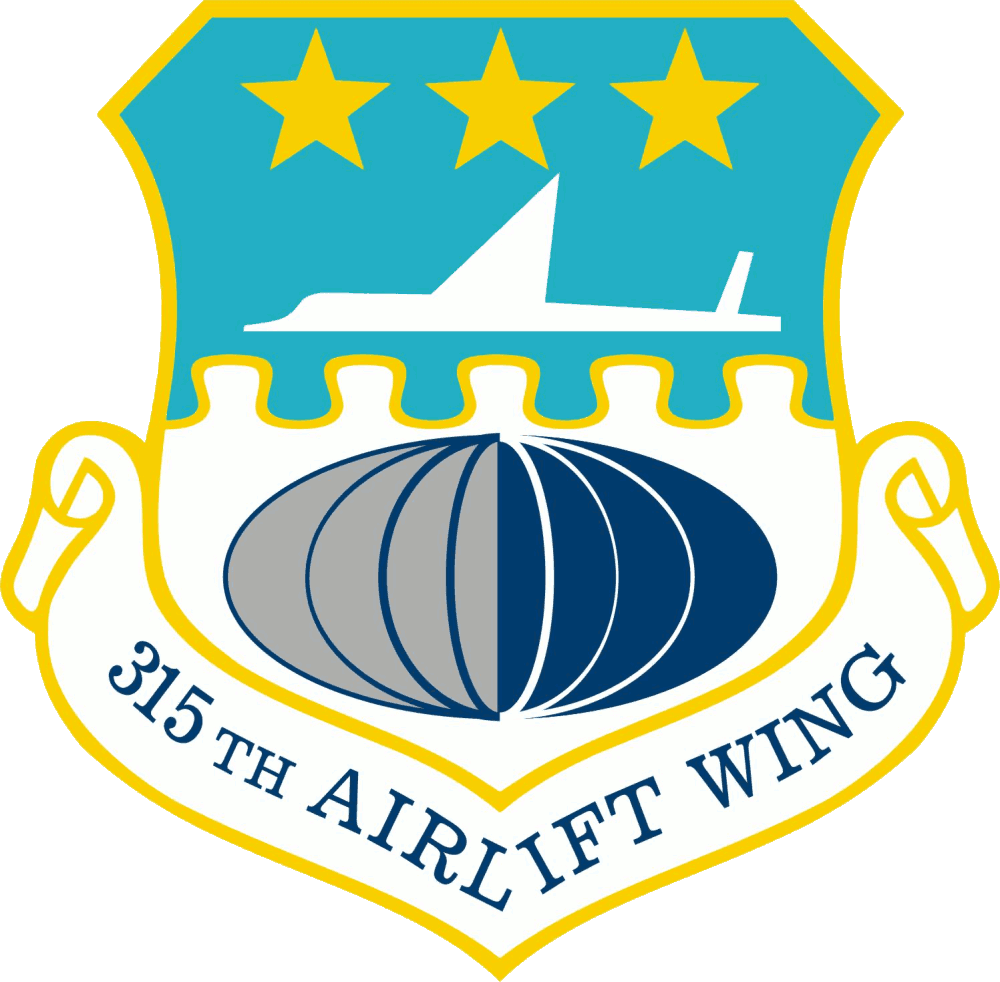
- 315th Airlift Wing emblem

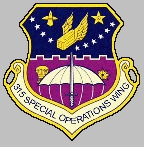
- 315th Special Operations wing emblem

Aircraft flown
- Transport: Boeing C-17 Globemaster III

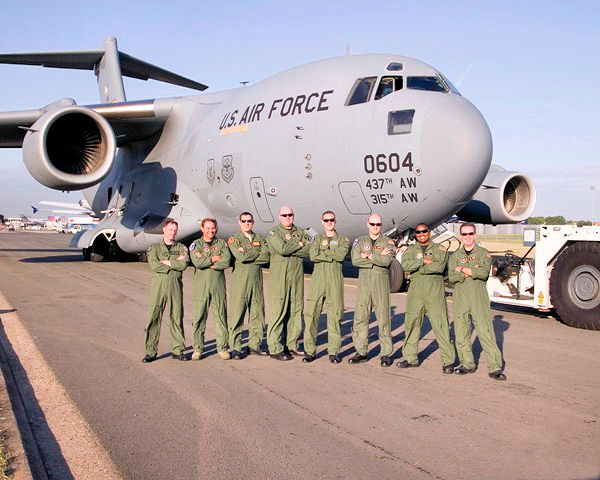
Members of the 315th and 437th Airlift Wings, Joint Base Charleston, S.C., participated in the International Paris Air Show in Le Bourget, France, 18 June 2009.

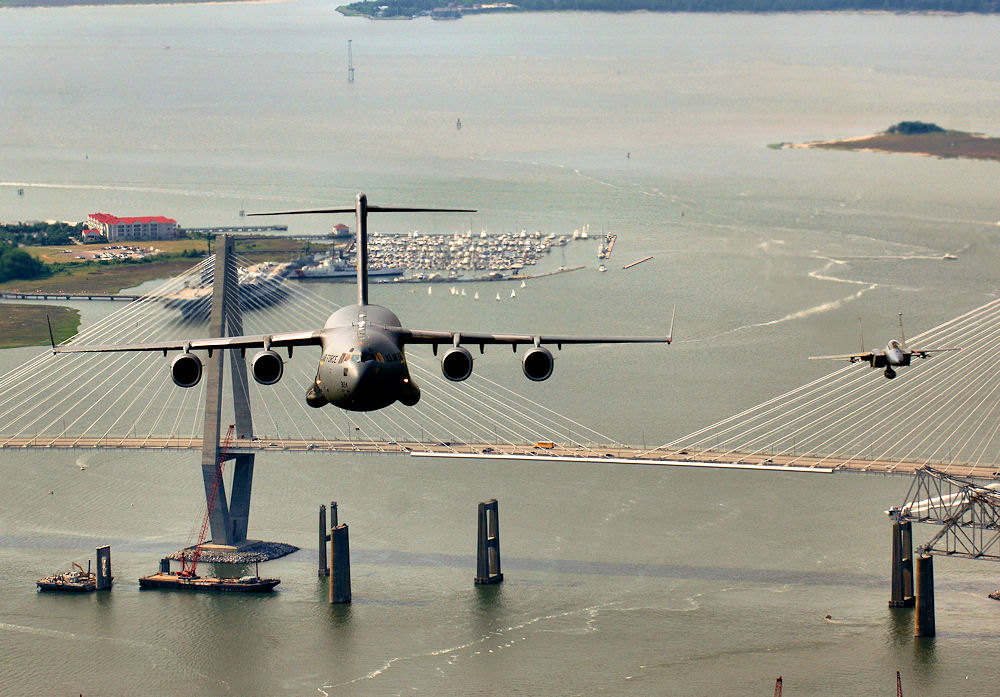
An F-15 Eagle from the 60th Fighter Squadron, Eglin Air Force Base, Fla., escorts a C-17 Globemaster III from the 14th Airlift Squadron, Joint Base Charleston, S.C., as they fly over the USS Yorktown and the Arthur J. Ravenel Jr. Bridge in the Charleston, S.C., area during a local training mission

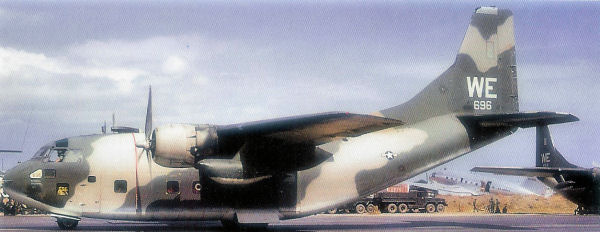
A C-123K of the 19th ACS, 315th ACW, Phan Rang, Vietnam, 1968.

The 315th Airlift Wing is a wing of the United States Air Force Reserve. It is stationed at Joint Base Lindsey Graham (former Joint Base Charleston), in the city of North Charleston, South Carolina, and operates the Boeing C-17 Globemaster III aircraft. If mobilized, the unit would fall under control of Air Mobility Command.

== Mission ==
The mission of the 315th Airlift Wing is to fly airlift missions, and provide expeditionary combat support and aeromedical evacuation personnel as a source of augmentation for the Air Force active force. The Wing also provides personnel and equipment to fill out normal activities of the active-duty 437th Airlift Wing and the 628th Air Base Wing, both also based at Joint Base Charleston. Peacetime missions include humanitarian airlift as part of the Denton Cargo Program.

== Components ==
315th Operations Group

- 300th Airlift Squadron (300 AS)
- 317th Airlift Squadron (317 AS)
- 701st Airlift Squadron (701 AS)
- 315th Aerospace Medicine Squadron (315 AMDS)
- 315th Aeromedical Evacuation Squadron (315 AES)
- 315th Airlift Control Flight (315 ACF)
- 4th Combat Camera Squadron (4 CTCS)

315th Maintenance Group (315 MXG)

- 315th Maintenance Squadron (315 MXS)
- 315th Aircraft Maintenance Squadron (315 AMXS)
- 315th Maintenance Operations Squadron (315 MOS)

315th Mission Support Group (315 MSG)

- 38th Aerial Port Squadron (38 APS)
- 53d Aerial Port Squadron (53 APS)
- 81st Aerial Port Squadron (81 APS)
- 84th Aerial Port Squadron (84 APS)
- 315th Mission Support Squadron (315 MSS)
- 315th Security Forces Squadron (315 SFS)
- 315th Services Flight (315 SVF)
- 315th Logistics Readiness Flight (315 LRF)

== History ==
Established as the 315 Troop Carrier Wing, Medium, on 23 May 1952 under Far East Air Forceces (FEAF) in Japan. Activated on 10 Jun 1952. During the Korean War, the wing flew troop and cargo airlift and airdrop, leaflet drops, spray missions, air evacuation, search and rescue, and other aerial missions in theater as part of FEAF's 315th Air Division. It remained in the Far East after the war to fly transport missions and paratroop training flights in Japan, Korea, French Indo-China, and other points until December 1954, after which it was again inactivated 18 Jan 1955.

Reactivated in 21 Feb 1966 under Pacific Air Forces, the unit was established at Tan Son Nhut Air Base, South Vietnam. It engaged in special operations directly under Seventh Air Force in Saigon, operating Fairchild C-123 Provider aircraft with Air Commando squadrons engaging in unconventional warfare. Moved to Phan Rang Air Base in 1967. Also operated UC-123 aerial spraying aircraft for Operation Ranch Hand defoliation missions. Phased out special operations missions in 1970, and thereafter carried out transport missions within South Vietnam. In 1971, became to train Republic of Vietnam Air Force C-123 aircrews. It was inactivated in South Vietnam in March 1972.

Reactivated in 1973 as a heavy transport wing in the Air Force Reserve, operating the Lockheed C-141 Starlifter aircraft, stationed alongside and using the same airframes as the active-duty 437th Airlift Wing at Charleston Air Force Base, South Carolina. It has since trained Air Force reserve aircrews for strategic airlift, including channel, special assignment, humanitarian, and combat airlift missions. In the 1980s and 1990s, personnel participated in contingency and humanitarian aid airlift operations and exercises worldwide. In 1994, the wing conducted the first McDonnell Douglas C-17 Globemaster III flight with an all-Air Force reserve crew. It also took part in the first combined U.S. – Russian exercise that year. The unit retired its last C-141 in 2001 and has flown the C-17 exclusively since.

=== Lineage ===
- Established as the 315th Troop Carrier Wing, Medium on 23 May 1952

Activated on 10 June 1952
Inactivated on 18 January 1955

- Redesignated 315th Air Commando Wing, Troop Carrier and activated, on 21 February 1966 (not organized)

Organized on 8 March 1966
Redesignated 315th Air Commando Wing on 1 August 1967
Redesignated 315th Special Operations Wing on 1 August 1968
Redesignated 315th Tactical Airlift Wing on 1 January 1970
Inactivated on 31 March 1972

- Redesignated 315th Military Airlift Wing (Associate) on 29 January 1973

Activated in the reserve on 1 July 1973
Redesignated 315th Airlift Wing (Associate) on 1 February 1992
Redesignated 315th Airlift Wing on 1 October 1994

=== Assignments ===
- 315th Air Division (Combat Cargo), 10 June 1952 – 18 January 1955
- Pacific Air Forces, 21 February 1966
- 315th Air Division (Combat Cargo), 8 March 1966 (attached to 2d Air Division, 8 March 1966, Seventh Air Force, 1 April-15 October 1966)
- 834th Air Division, 15 October 1966
- Seventh Air Force, 1 December 1971 – 31 March 1972
- Eastern Air Force Reserve Region, 1 July 1973
- Fourteenth Air Force, 8 October 1976
- Twenty-Second Air Force, 1 July 1993 – September 2011
- Fourth Air Force, September 2011 – present

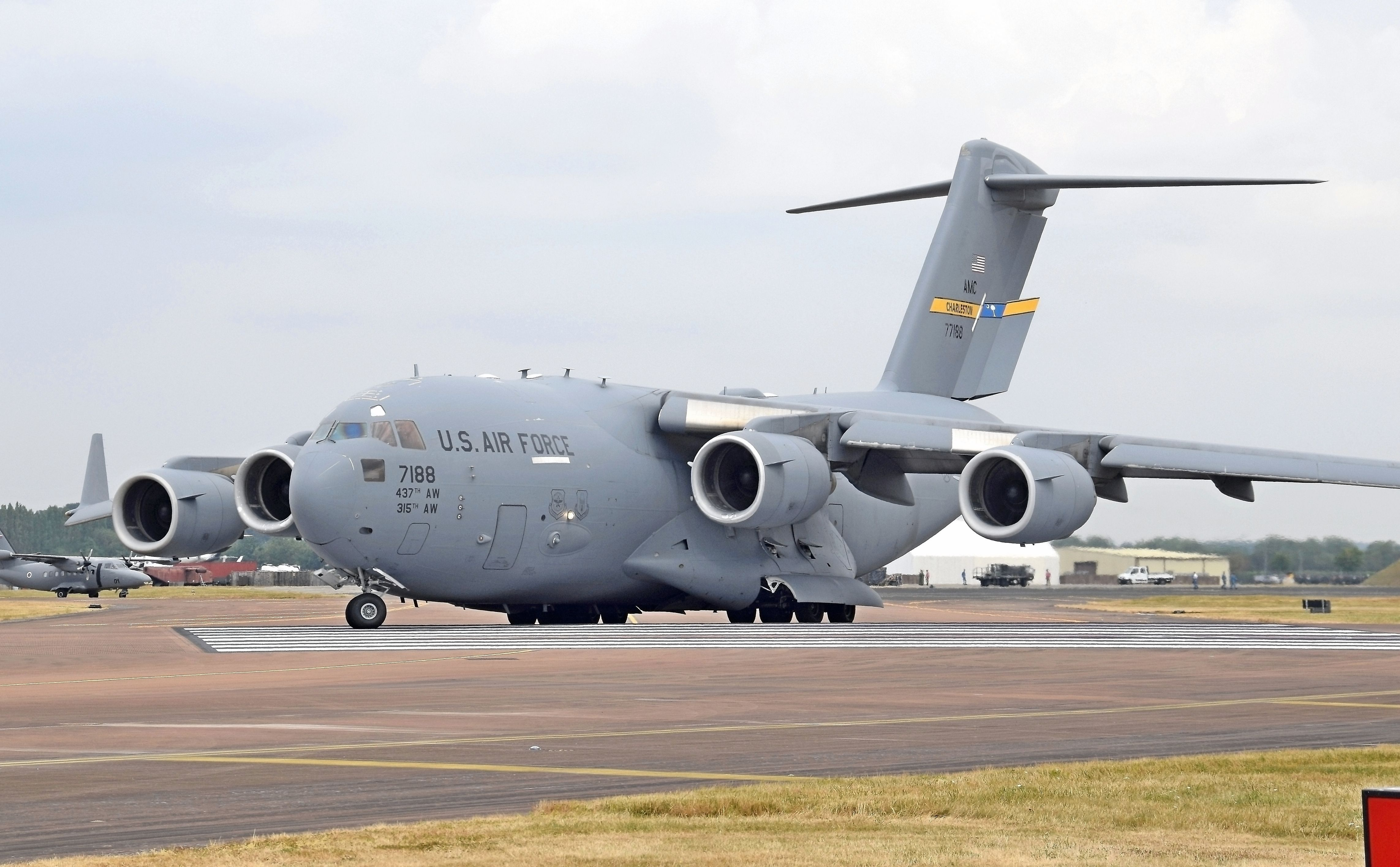
Boeing C-17 Globemaster III crewed by the 315th Airlift Wing taxis for departure at the 2018 RIAT, England

=== Components ===
Groups

- 315th Troop Carrier Group (later, 315 Operations): 10 June 1952 – 18 January 1955; 1 August 1992 – present

Squadrons

- 8th Special Operations Squadron: 31 July 1971 – 15 January 1972 (detached 5–15 January 1972).
- 9th Special Operations Squadron: 30 September 1971 – 29 February 1972 (detached 9 January-29 February 1972)
- 12th Air Commando Squadron (later 12 Special Operations Squadron): 15 October 1966 – 30 September 1970
- 19th Air Commando Squadron (later 19 Special Operations Squadron): 8 March 1966 – 10 June 1971
- 38th Aerial Port Squadron, 1 October 1982 – 1 August 1992
- 300th Military Airlift Squadron (later 300th Airlift Squadron): 1 July 1973 – 1 August 1992
- 309th Air Commando Squadron (later 309th Special Operations Squadron, 309th Tactical Airlift Squadron): 8 March 1966 – 31 July 1970
- 310th Air Commando Squadron (later 310th Special Operations Squadron, 310th Tactical Airlift Squadron): 8 March 1966 – 15 January 1972, attached 16–26 January 1972
- 311th Air Commando Squadron (later 311th Special Operations Squadron, 311th Tactical Airlift Squadron): 8 March 1966 – 5 October 1971
- 317th Airlift Squadron: 1 April-1 August 1992
- 701st Military Airlift Squadron (later 701st Airlift Squadron): 1 July 1973 – 1 August 1992
- 707th Military Airlift Squadron (later 707th Airlift Squadron): 1 July 1973 – 1 August 1992

=== Stations ===
- Brady AB, Japan, 10 June 1952 – 18 January 1955
- Tan Son Nhut Airport, South Vietnam, 8 March 1966
- Phan Rang Air Base, South Vietnam, 15 June 1967 – 31 March 1972
- Charleston Air Force Base (later Joint Base Charleston), South Carolina, 1 July 1973 – – present

=== Aircraft ===
- Curtiss C-46 Commando (1952–1955)
- Fairchild UC-123 Provider (1966–1971)
- Fairchild C-123 Provider (1966–1972)
- Cessna A-37 Dragonfly (1971–1972)
- Cessna O-2 Skymaster (1971–1972)
- Lockheed C-141 Starlifter (1973–2000)
- Boeing C-17 Globemaster III (1993–present)

== Unit emblems ==
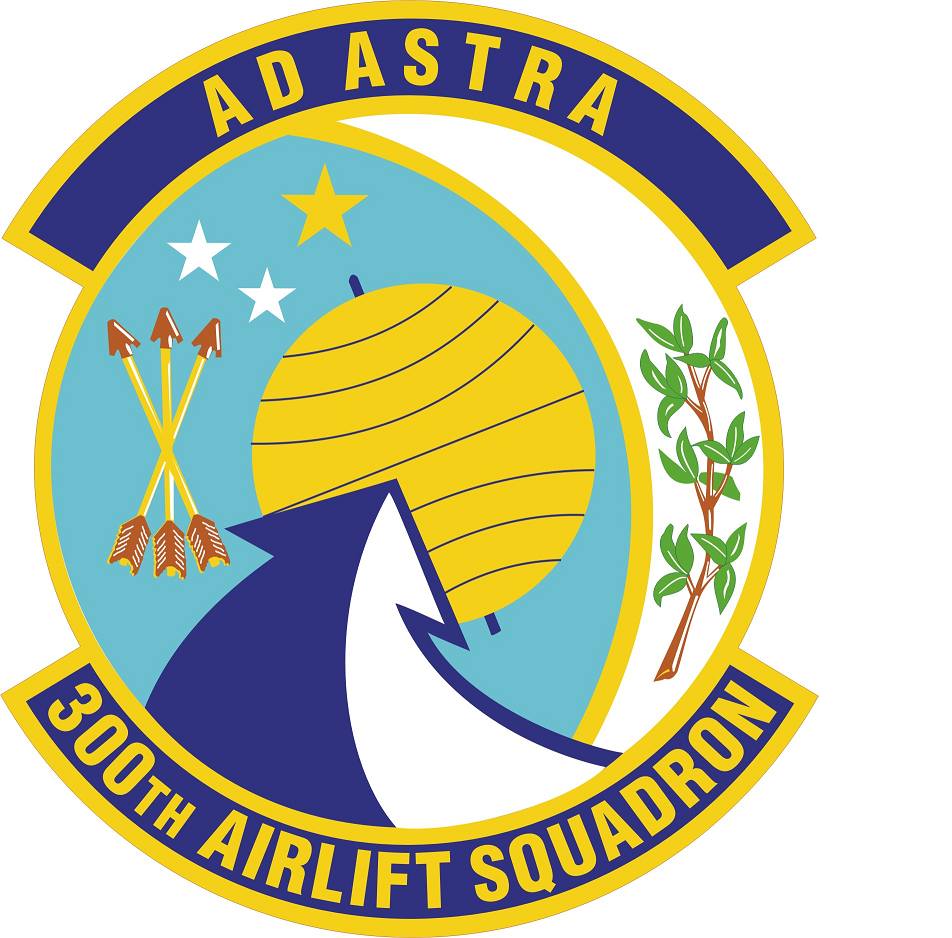
300 AS

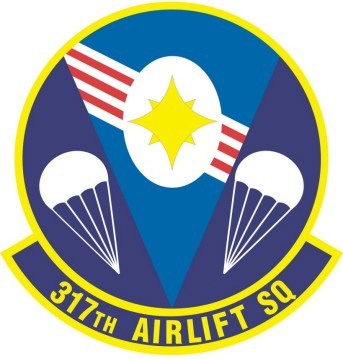
317 AS

701 AS

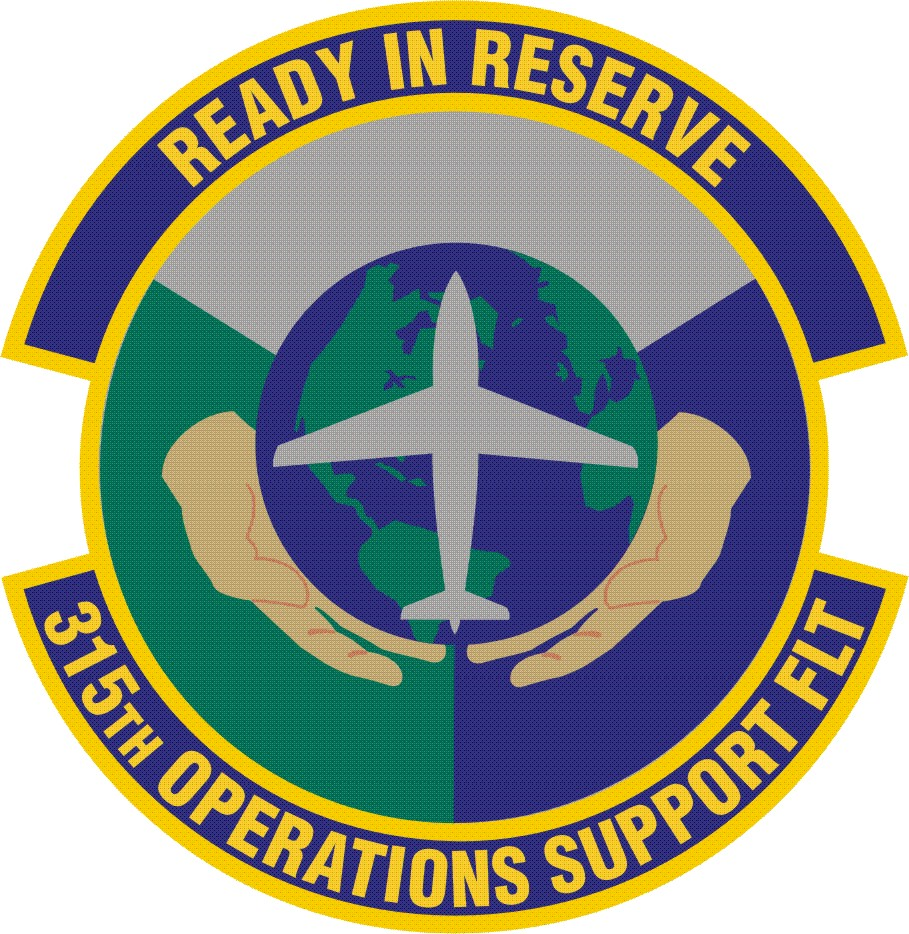
315 OSS

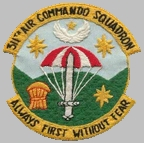
311 ACS

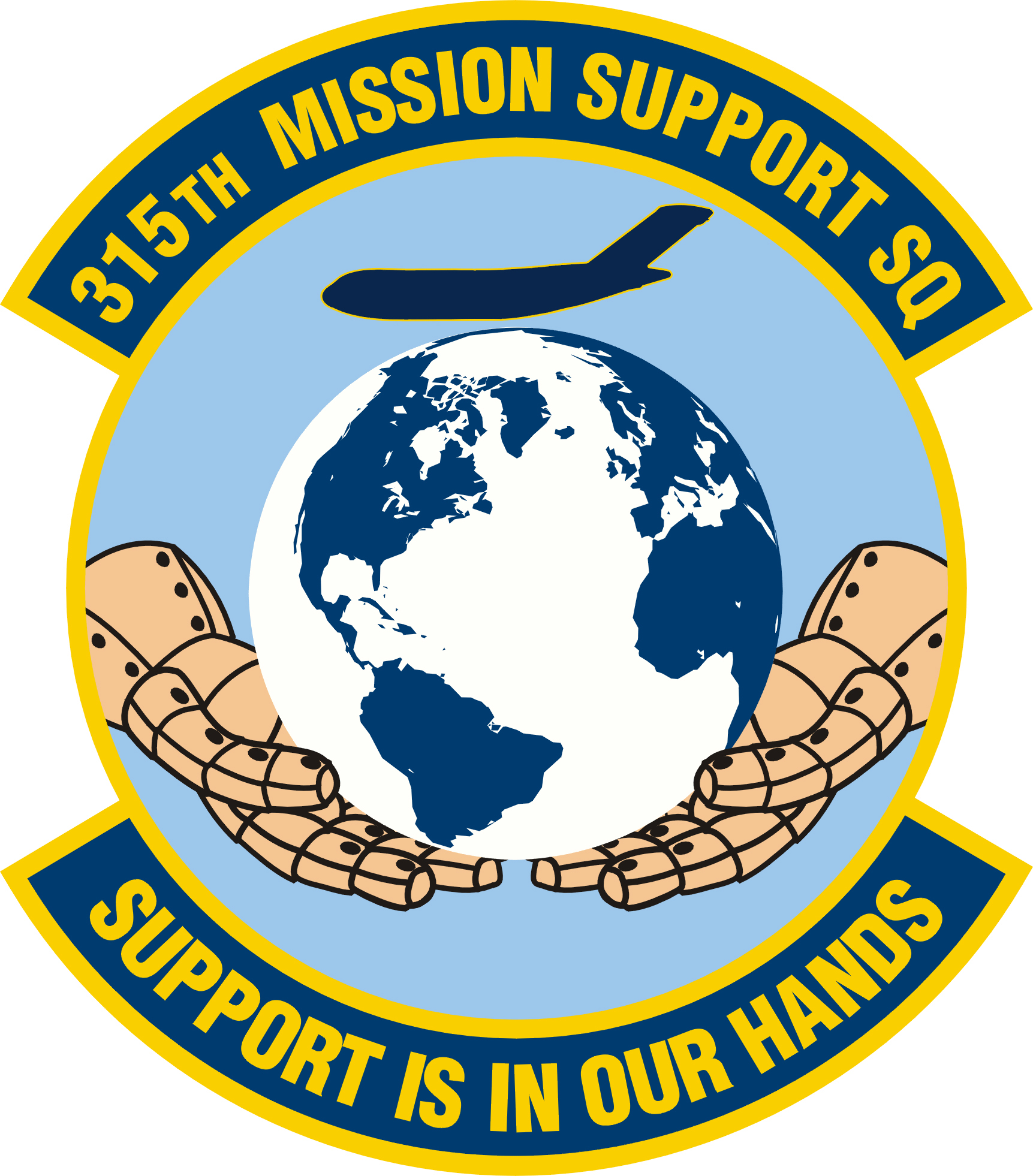
315 MSS

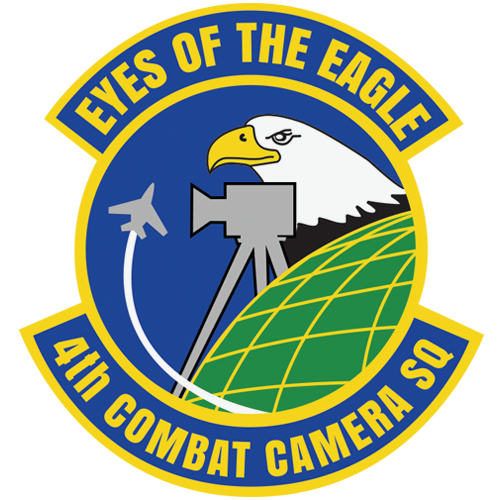
4 CTCS

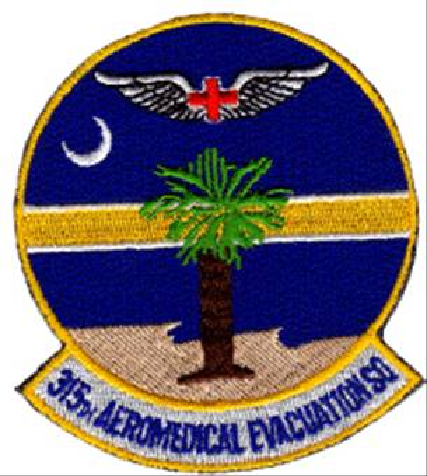
315 AE
