= 4th Combat Camera Squadron =

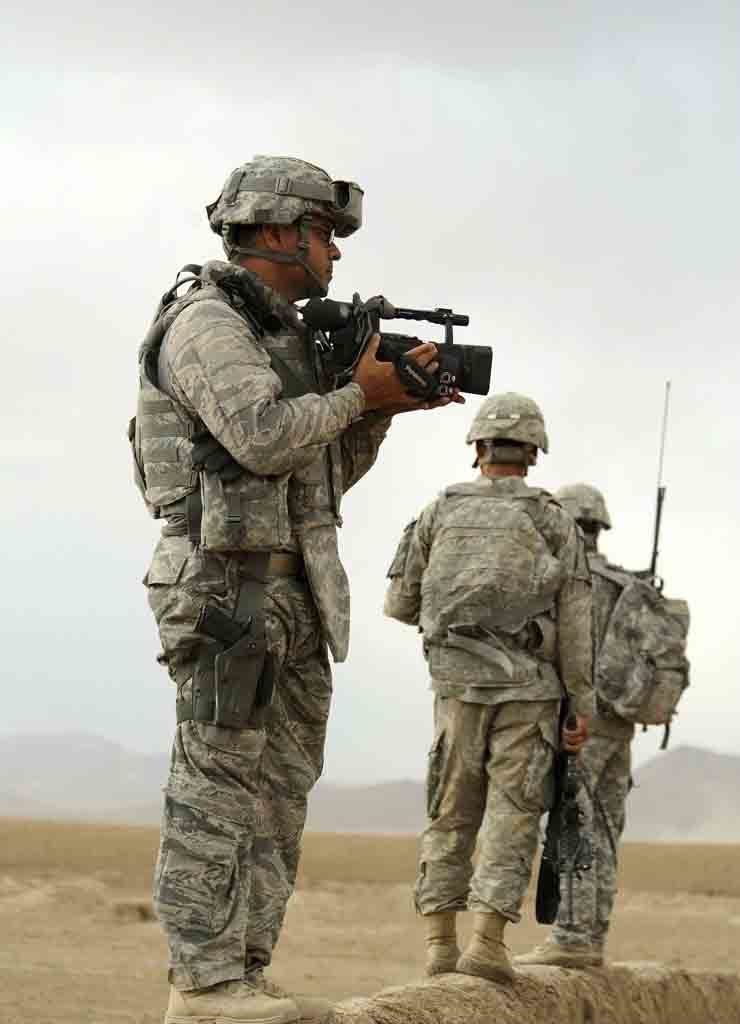
- The 4th Combat Camera Squadron maintains quick-response teams able to embed and operate with tactical units in austere environments for up to thirty days.
- Active: 1943–1945; 1996–2015; 2017–present
- Country: United States
- Branch: U.S. Air Force
- Type: Squadron
- Role: Combat Photo and Video
- Part of: U.S. Air Force Reserves
- Garrison/HQ: Joint Base Charleston, Charleston, South Carolina
- Motto: Eyes of the Eagle
- Engagements: : World War II; European Campaign (1943–1945): Operation Iraqi Freedom (2003–2011); Operation Enduring Freedom (2001–present)

- Decorations: AFOUA

Commanders
- Current Commander: Lieutenant Colonel Michael R. Odle
- Senior Enlisted Leader: Chief Master Sergeant Michelle Harris

Insignia
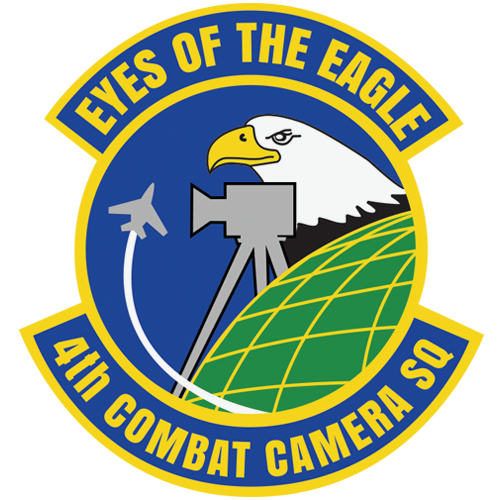
- 4th Combat Camera Squadron Emblem (approved 30 June 1998)

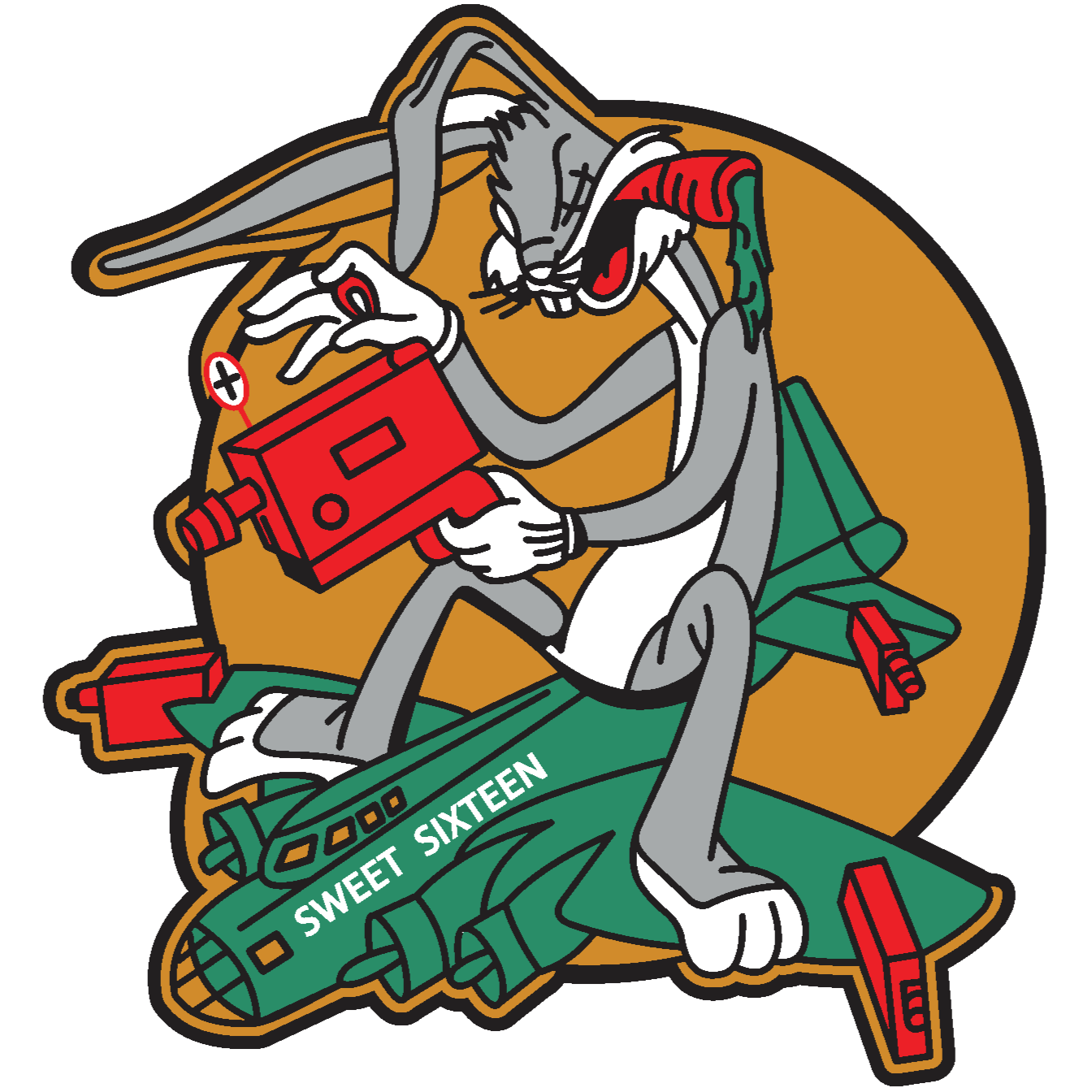
- USAAF 4th Combat Camera Unit Emblem (World War II): The term "Sweet Sixteen" refers to the 16mm film used at the time.

The 4th Combat Camera Squadron (4th CTCS) is a unit of the U.S. Air Force Reserve, 315th Airlift Wing, 315th Operations Group, located at Joint Base Charleston, Charleston, South Carolina.

== Mission ==
The 4th CTCS mission is unique and highly specialized. The Airmen of the 4th CTCS are an operational asset designed to assist in shaping the information landscape, and to help senior Department of Defense officials, combatant commanders, and joint leaders understand, visualize, describe, and direct forces by providing high-quality battlefield video and still imagery.

Additionally, the 4th CTCS manages the U.S. Air Force Reserve's only fully mission-qualified aircrew photographers, a unique asset providing aerial documentation from a variety of USAF and Department of Defense aircraft. The unit supports wartime operations, worldwide crises, contingencies, joint exercises and humanitarian operations.

== History ==
=== First Motion Picture Unit ===
The 4th CTCS, "Eyes of the Eagle," has been bestowed the Lineage and Honors history of the First Motion Picture Unit (1st FMPU), a primary film production unit of the U.S. Army Air Forces activated in Culver City, California in July 1942. It was the first military unit made up entirely of professionals from the film industry. Actors such as Clark Gable, William Holden and Alan Ladd, and directors including Richard L. Bare and John Sturges served with the unit. Future president Ronald Reagan, who transferred from the cavalry reserve, was a captain in the unit.

=== 4th Combat Camera Unit ===
On 16 August 1943, six officers and 23 enlisted men were transferred from the 1st FMPU, to create the new 4th Combat Camera Unit (4th CCU) with Capt. William H. Clothier as the first commanding officer.

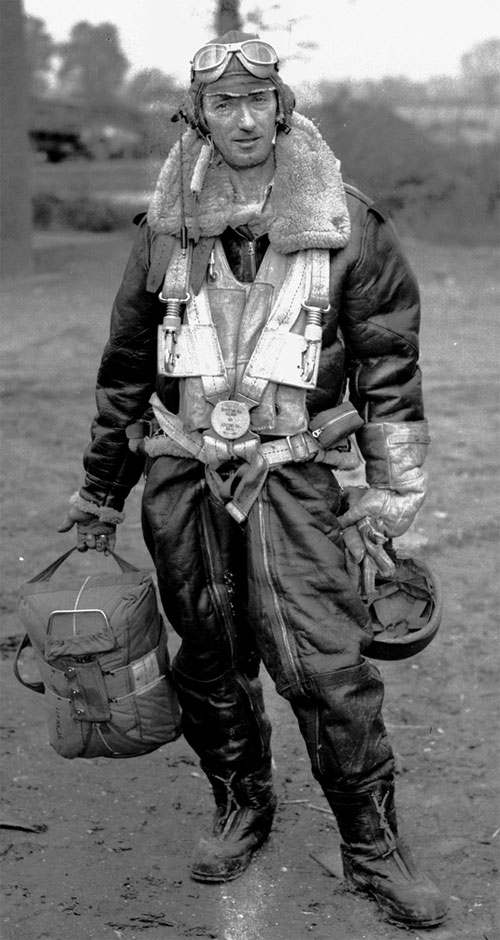
4th Combat Camera Unit member Ron O'Neal makes ready to board his aircraft during WWII.

The 4th CCU was trained by the 1st FMPU at Page Military Academy, a multi-acre site in West Los Angeles. Training included intensive instruction in photography with a variety of motion picture and still cameras, camera maintenance, aerial photography and cinematography under true flight conditions, rigid physical training, ground combat and weapons training.

During World War II, fourteen US Army Air Force Combat Camera Units, including the 4th CCU, provided still and motion picture coverage of the war. Their visual record was used for operational analysis, training, public information, and as a permanent historical record.

In the final months of World War II, a unique team of motion picture professionals, which included members from the 4th CCU, loaded their cameras with color film, and fanned out across Europe to document the final struggle against Hitler's Nazi Germany. From the airways over Germany, to the crossing of the Rhine, the liberation of concentration camps and the fall of Berlin, the 4th CCU far exceeded their orders to photograph the impacts of airpower on the war.

The Army Air Forces wanted the footage for a feature-length documentary "Chasing Hitler," that they planned to release to the public that showed how the Army Air Forces were winning the war in Europe. However, by war's end the $1 million price tag was too high and the 100,020 feet of 16mm colored film (a total of 55 hours), was labeled Top Secret and shelved in government archives.

After the war, military photographic units, such as the 4th CCU, inactivated as the United States turned to peacetime duties.

=== 4th Combat Camera Squadron ===
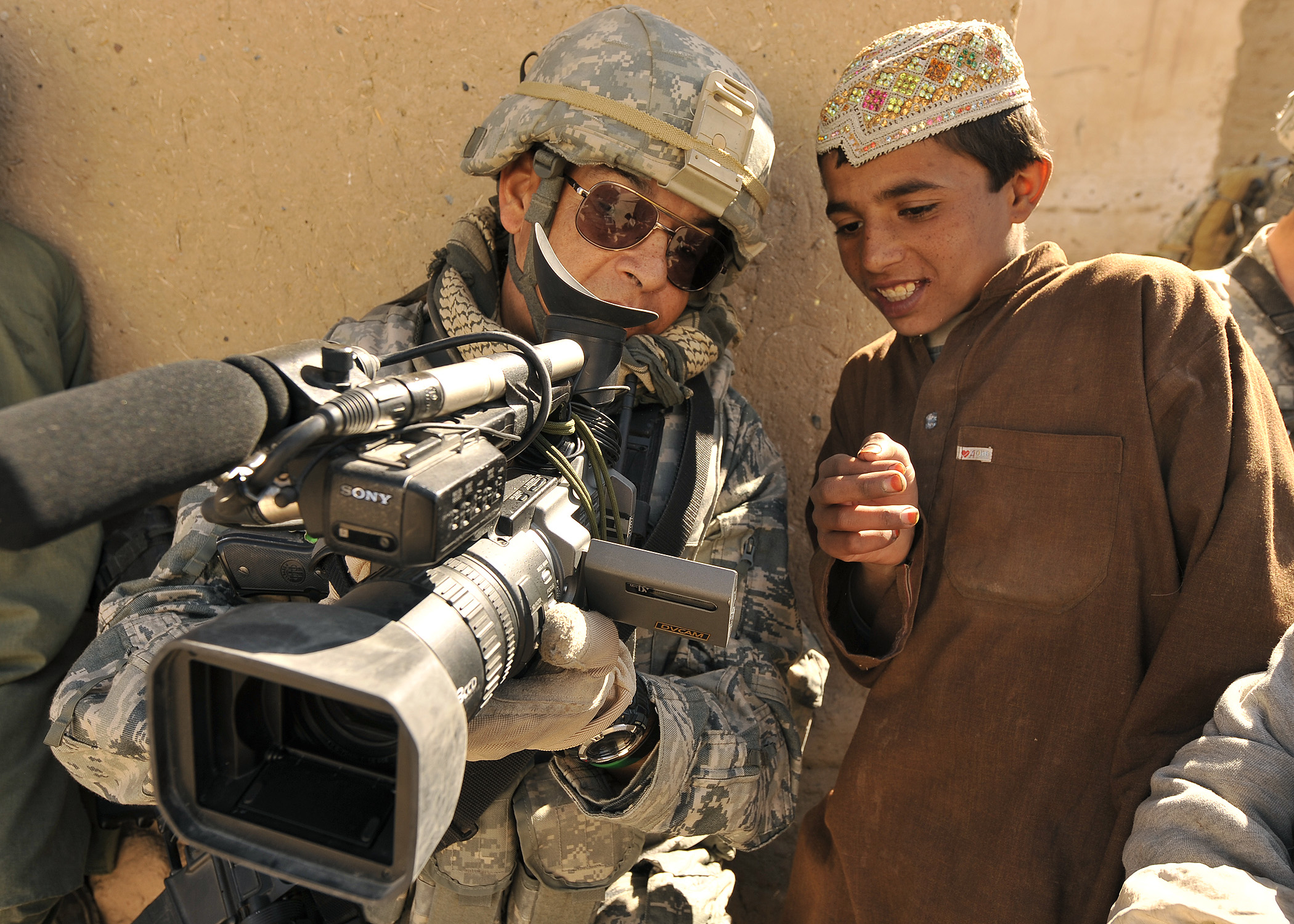
An airman with the 4th Combat Camera Squadron, shows his video recording to a student at the Wazi Muhammad Khan School in Hutal, Afghanistan, 7 January 2010.

In March 1996, the 4th CCU was re-designated the 4th Combat Camera Squadron (4th CTCS) and activated in the U.S. Air Force Reserve at March Air Force Base on 31 March 1996, as the only combat camera squadron in the Air Force Reserve.

On 1 October 2007, the visual information career fields and functions, including combat camera, were merged with the public affairs function under the single umbrella of the Secretary of the Air Force Office of Public Affairs. The following year, on 1 October 2008, four combat camera squadrons, including the 4th CTCS, were aligned under the Air Force Public Affairs Agency (AFPAA).

As a result of the challenging fiscal environment, the 4th CTCS was inactivated on 31 July 2015. During the squadron's 19 years, Airmen documented more than 250 worldwide combat, humanitarian, expeditionary and training missions with still photography and video, including humanitarian aid in Somalia; Desert Storm/Desert Shield in Kuwait, Iraq and Saudi Arabia; peacekeeping efforts in Bosnia and Herzegovina, Croatia, and Kosovo; Operation Iraqi Freedom and Operation Enduring Freedom in Iraq, Afghanistan, Columbia, Southwest Asia, and Hurricanes Katrina and Rita.

=== Today ===
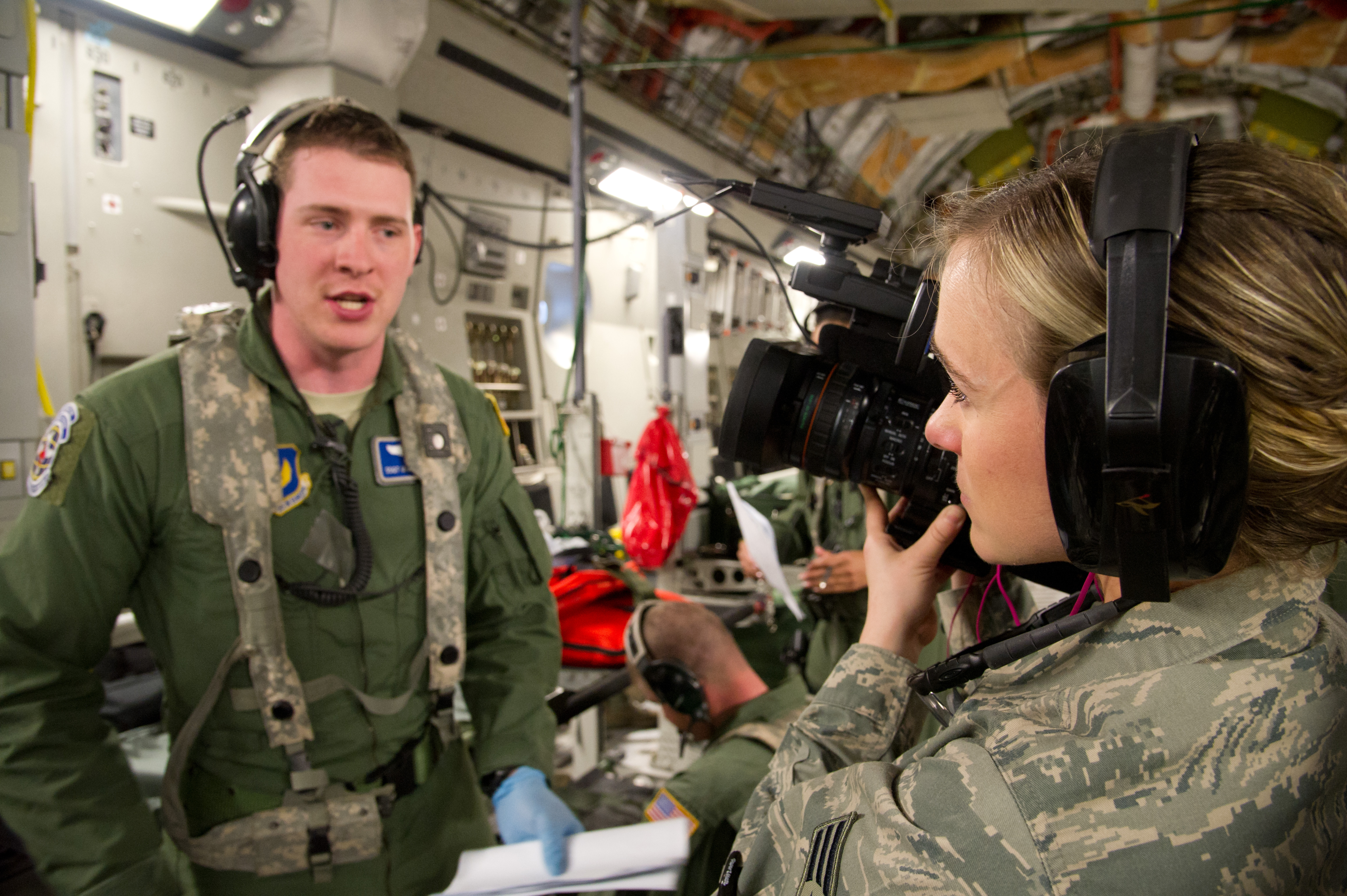
A broadcast journalist with the 4th Combat Camera Squadron interviews an aeromedical service journeyman with the 86th Aeromedical Evacuation Squadron.

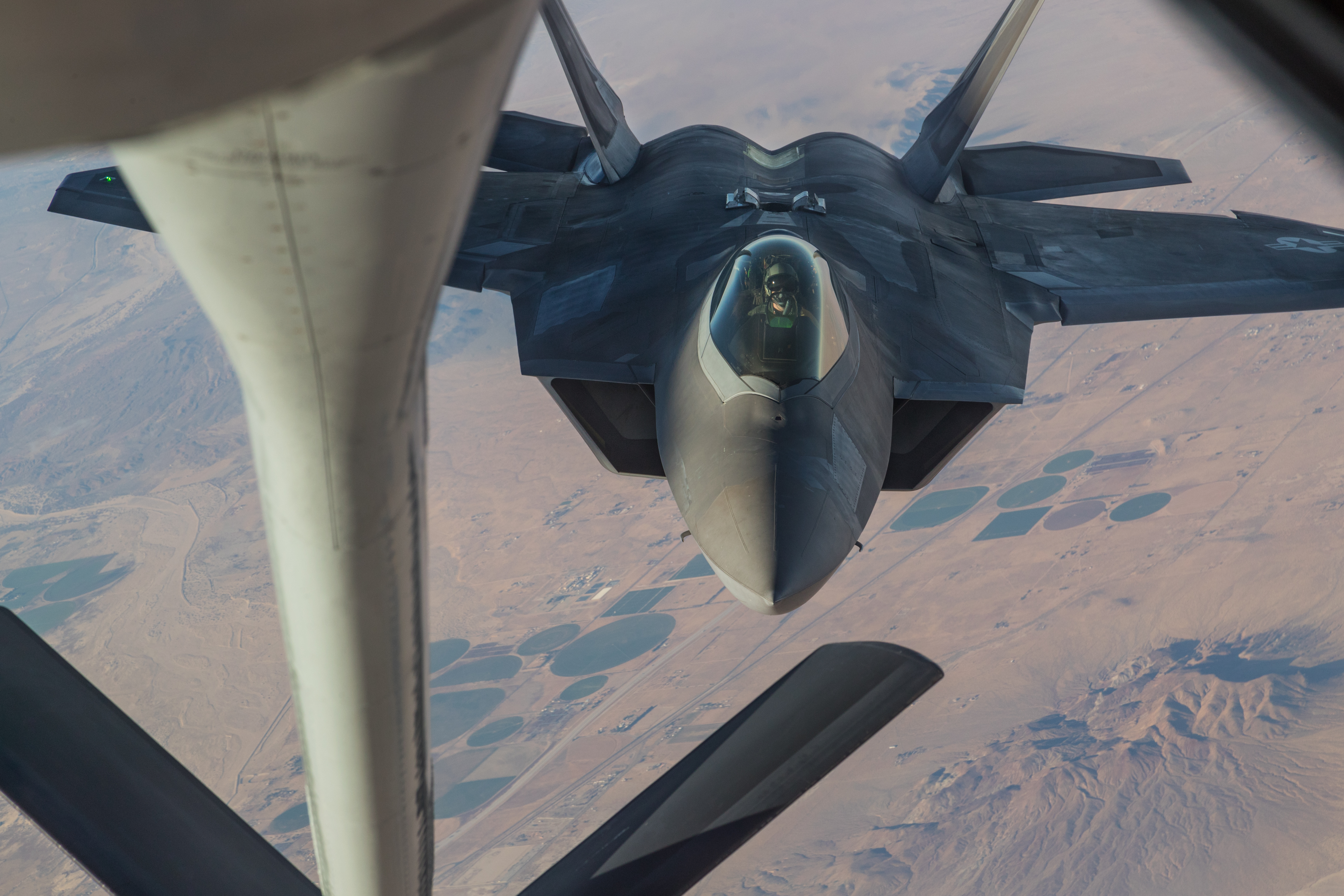
A U.S. Air Force F-22A conducting aerial refueling as documented by a 4th Combat Camera Squadron aerial photographer.

In 2017, the Air Force announced the 4th CTCS would again be activated. However, instead of being located at March Air Reserve Base, California, the unit would be co-located with the active duty's 1st Combat Camera Squadron at Joint Base Charleston, South Carolina. Aligned under the U.S. Air Force Reserve, 315th Airlift Wing, 315th Operations Group, the 4th CTCS is the only combat camera unit aligned under operations and the only unit of its kind in the Air Force Reserve. On 5 May 2017, U.S. Air Force Major Hamilton Underwood assumed command of the newly activated 4th CTCS during an activation and assumption of command ceremony.

Today, whenever, wherever there is a worldwide crisis or disaster, a contingency or wartime operation or a military exercise involving Air Force, joint or multinational services, the highly skilled professional Airmen of the 4th CTCS are capturing the imagery necessary to support operational needs, combat misinformation and disinformation, and provide invaluable visual historical records.

== Lineage ==
- Constituted 4 February 1943, as 4th Army Air Forces Combat Camera Unit and Activated 12 February 1943. Inactivated on 2 December 1945.
- Redesignated: 4th Combat Camera Squadron, 7 March 1996, and activated in the U.S. Air Force Reserve, 31 March 1996. Inactivated on 31 July 2015.
- Activated: 4th Combat Camera Squadron, 3 March 2017.

== Components ==
- First Motion Picture Unit, 12 February 1943
- Ninth Air Force, 17 Nov 1943
- U.S. Air Forces Europe, 13 Nov 1945 – 2 Dec 1945
- 452nd Support Group, 31 March 1996
- 604th Regional Support Group, 1 January 2002
- 452nd Mission Support Group, 1 Oct 2010 – 31 Jul 2015
- 315th Operations Group, 3 March 2017

== Stations ==
- Culver City, CA, 12 Feb – 25 Oct 1943
- Gosfield, England, 18 November 1943
- Marks Hall, England, 4 December 1943
- Ascot (Sunninghill Park), England, 17 December 1943
- St. Savuer Lendelin, France, 5 August 1944
- Force, France, 23 August 1944
- Chantilly, France, 11 September 1944
- Bad Kissingen, Germany, 5 June 1945
- Camp Myles Standish, MA, 1–2 Dec 1945
- March AFB (later, March ARB), CA, 31 March 1996
- Joint Base Charleston, SC, 3 Mar 2017–present

== Awards and Campaign Streamers ==
Award streamer	Award	Dates	Notes
	Outstanding Unit Award	1 Sep 1997 – 31 Aug 1999	4th Combat Camera Squadron
	Outstanding Unit Award	2 Sep 2003 – 1 Sep 2005	4th Combat Camera Squadron
	Outstanding Unit Award	2 Sep 2006 – 1 Sep 2008	4th Combat Camera Squadron
	Outstanding Unit Award	1 Jan 2017 – 31 Dec 2018	4th Combat Camera Squadron

Campaign Streamer	Campaign	Dates	Notes
	Air Offensive, Europe	2 November 1943 – 5 June 1944	4th Combat Camera Unit
	Normandy	6 June 1944 – 24 July 1944	4th Combat Camera Unit
	Northern France	25 July 1944 – 14 September 1944	4th Combat Camera Unit
	Rhineland	15 September 1944 – 21 March 1945	4th Combat Camera Unit
	Ardennes-Alsace	16 December 1944 – 25 January 1945	4th Combat Camera Unit
	Central Europe	22 March 1944 – 21 May 1945	4th Combat Camera Unit
