= 43d Troop Carrier Squadron =

43d Tactical Airlift Training Squadron (formerly 43d Troop Carrier Squadron)
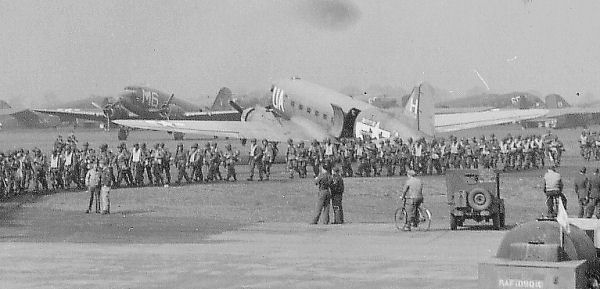
- 315th Troop Carrier Group C-47 Skytrains with squadron plane in foreground
- Active: 1942–1945; 1947–1948; 1952–1955; 1971–1972
- Country: United States
- Branch: United States Air Force
- Role: airlift
- Engagements: European Theater of Operations; Mediterranean Theater of Operations
- Decorations: Distinguished Unit Citation; Republic of Korea Presidential Unit Citation

Insignia
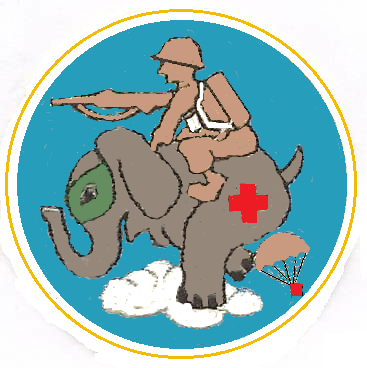
- 43d Troop Carrier Squadron emblem (Note: Approved 3 December 1953.)

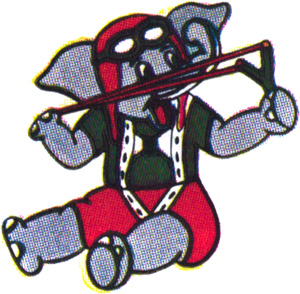
- 43d Troop Carrier Squadron emblem (World War II)
- World War II fuselage code: UA

The 43d Troop Carrier Squadron is an inactive United States Air Force unit. Its last assignment was with the 315th Troop Carrier Group, based at Brady Air Base, Japan. It was inactivated on 18 January 1955.

== History ==
=== World War II ===
Established in early 1942 as a Douglas C-47 Skytrain transport squadron under First Air Force, later trained under I Troop Carrier Command in the eastern United States. Deployed to England in December 1942, being assigned to VIII Air Support Command, Eighth Air Force to provide transport and resupply support to the buildup of the heavy bomber force in England.

Was detached to Twelfth Air Force in Algeria in May 1943 to provide air resupply and transport during the North African Campaign in Algeria and Tunisia. Also performed combat casualty evacuation of wounded personnel to rear areas. Remained under jurisdiction of VIII Air Service Command while in North Africa, providing transport between England and North Africa from its base in Algeria. Returned to England in early 1944 to participate in the buildup of forces prior to the Allied landings in France during D-Day in June 1944.

Engaged in combat operations by dropping paratroops into Normandy on D-Day (6 June 1944) and releasing gliders with reinforcements on the following day. The unit received a Distinguished Unit Citation and a French citation for these missions.

After the Normandy invasion the squadron ferried supplies in the United Kingdom. The squadron also hauled food, clothing, medicine, gasoline, ordnance equipment, and other supplies to the front lines and evacuated patients to rear zone hospitals. It dropped paratroops near Nijmegen and towed gliders carrying reinforcements during the airborne attack on the Netherlands. In December, it participated in the Battle of the Bulge by releasing gliders with supplies for the 101st Airborne Division near Bastogne.

Moved to Belgium in early 1945, and participated in the Western Allied invasion of Germany, participating in the air assault across the Rhine River in March 1945, each aircraft towed two gliders with troops of the 17th Airborne Division and released them near Wesel.

In late May 1945, after V-E Day, the squadron moved to Waller Field, Trinidad and attached to Air Transport Command. From Trinidad, the squadron ferried returning military personnel to Morrison Field, Florida, where they were sent on to other bases or prepared for separation after the war. Inactivated at the end of July 1945.

=== Korean War ===
Apparently not manned, 1947–1948. Activated by Far East Air Force in 1952 as a combat resupply and transport squadron, based in Japan. Provided aerial transportation between Japan and Korea during the Korean War with Curtiss C-46 Commandos. Inactivated in 1955 in Japan.

=== Special operations training ===
The squadron was redesignated the 43d Tactical Airlift Training Squadron and activated at England Air Force Base, Louisiana in September 1971 to train aircrews in special operations airlift operations. As the United States withdrew from Southeast Asia, the squadron was inactivated the following August.

=== Campaigns ===
- Campaigns. World War II: Sicily; Naples-Foggia; Rome-Arno; Normandy, Northern France; Rhineland; Central Europe. Korean War: Korea Summer-Fall, 1952, Third Korean Winter; Korea Summer-Fall, 1953.

== Lineage ==
- Constituted as the 43d Transport Squadron on 30 May 1942

Activated on 15 June 1942
Redesignated 43d Troop Carrier Squadron on 4 July 1942
Inactivated on 31 July 1945

- Activated on 19 May 1947

Inactivated on 10 September 1948

- Redesignated 43d Troop Carrier Squadron, Medium on 23 May 1952

Activated on 10 June 1952
Inactivated on 18 January 1955

- Redesignated 43d Tactical Airlift Training Squadron on 20 July 1971

Activated on 1 September 1971
Inactivated on 31 August 1972

=== Assignments ===
- 315th Transport Group (later 315th Troop Carrier Group), 14 February 1942 – 31 July 1945
- 315th Troop Carrier Group, 19 May 1947 – 10 September 1948
- 315th Troop Carrier Group, 10 June 1952 – 18 January 1955
- 4410th Special Operations Training Group, 1 September 1971 – 31 August 1972

=== Stations ===
- Olmsted Field, Pennsylvania, 15 June 1942
- Bowman Field, Kentucky, 17 June 1942
- Florence Army Air Field, South Carolina, 3 August-11 October 1942
- RAF Aldermaston (AAF-467), England, 1 December 1942 (operated from Blida Airfield, Algeria, 30 May 1943 – 7 March 1944)
- RAF Welford (AAF-474), England, 6 November 1943
- RAF Spanhoe (AAF-493), England, 7 February 1944
- Amiens/Glisy Airfield (B-48), France, 6 April–May 1945
- Waller Field, Trinidad, May-31 July 1945
- Langley Field, Virginia, 19 May 1947 – 10 September 1948
- Brady Air Base, Japan, 20 June 1952 – 18 January 1955
- England Air Force Base, Louisiana, 1 September 1971 – 31 August 1972

=== Aircraft ===
- Douglas C-47 Skytrain, 1942–1945
- Curtiss C-46 Commando, 1952–1955
- Fairchild C-123 Provider, 1971–1972
