= 707th Airlift Squadron =

707th Airlift Squadron

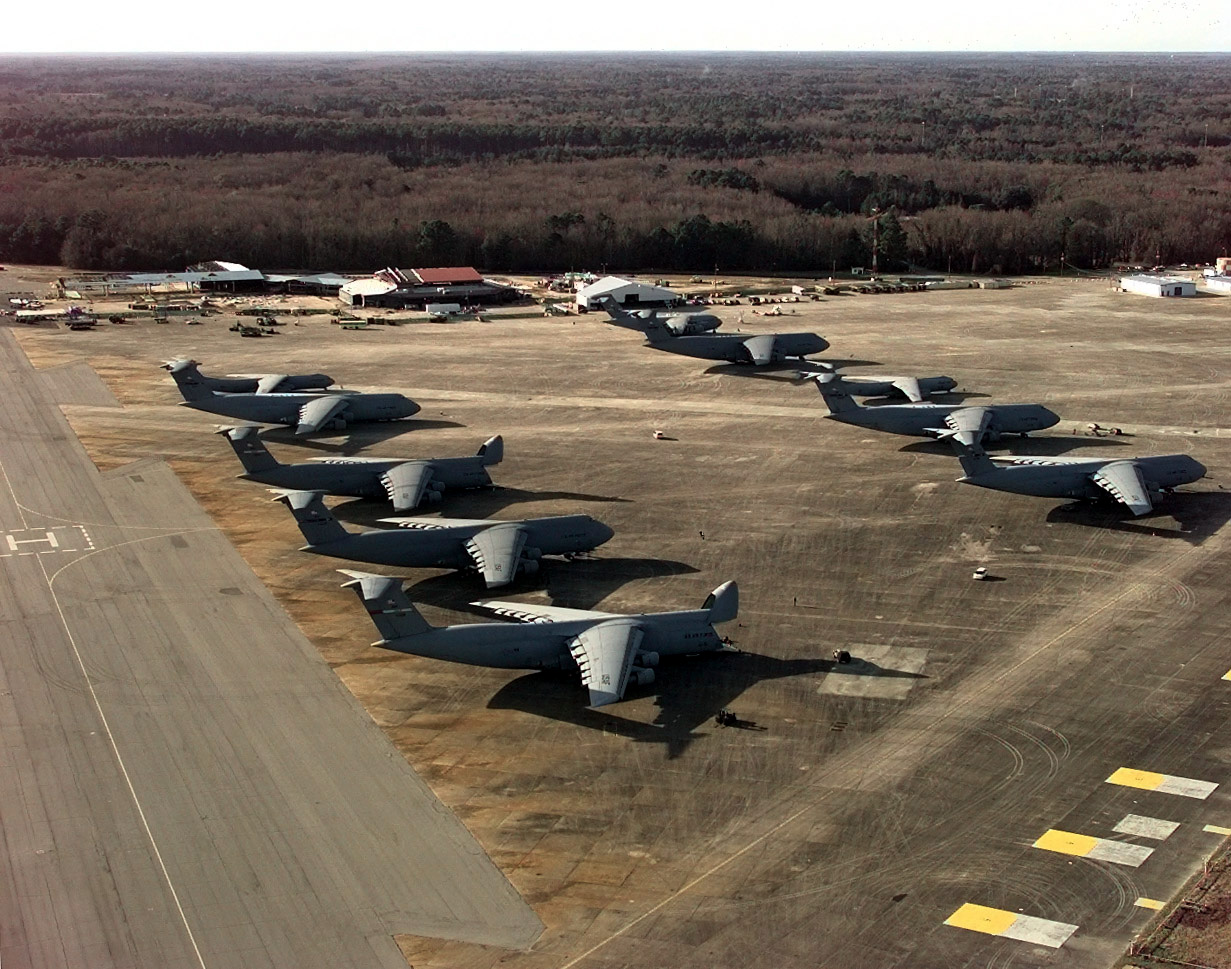
- C-141 Starlifters of the 315th Airlift Wing at Hunter Army Airfield with C-5 Galaxys of the 437th Airlift Wing
- Active: 1943–1944; 1972–1992
- Country: United States
- Branch: United States Air Force
- Role: Airlift
- Motto(s): Rook's Defense
- Engagements: American Theater of World War II
- Decorations: Air Force Outstanding Unit Award; Republic of Vietnam Gallantry Cross with Palm

Insignia
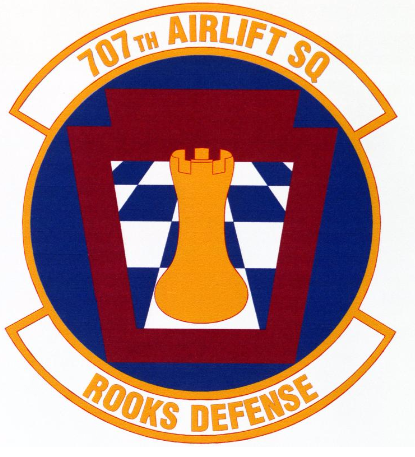
- 707th Airlift Sq emblem (approved c. July 1996

The 707th Airlift Squadron is an inactive United States Air Force Reserve unit. It was last assigned to the 315th Military Airlift Wing at Charleston Air Force Base, South Carolina. It was inactivated on 1 July 2000. The squadron was active during World War II as the 307th Troop Carrier Squadron a training unit that was part of the I Troop Carrier Command.

== History ==
=== World War II ===
The 307th Troop Carrier Squadron was activated as an operational training unit (OTU) in March 1943 and served in this role until July 1943. The OTU program involved the use of an oversized parent unit to provide cadres to "satellite groups". The 307th then served as a replacement training unit (RTU) for glider crews until April 1944. RTUs were oversized units to train individual pilots or aircrews.

However, the United States Army Air Forces found that standard military units, based on relatively inflexible tables of organization were proving less well adapted to the training mission. Accordingly, a more functional system was adopted in which each base was organized into a separate numbered unit. Accordingly, the 307th was disbanded and its mission, personnel, and equipment were absorbed by the 805th AAF Base Unit (Replacement Training Unit, Troop Carrier).

=== Reserve operations ===
The 707th Airlift Squadron was activated at Charleston AFB, South Carolina in 1972 as an Air Force Reserve associate squadron. The squadron did not have aircraft assigned, but flew Lockheed C-141 Starlifter aircraft assigned to the regular United States Air Force 437th Military Airlift Wing (later 437th Airlift Wing). The squadron was inactivated in 2000 as part of the C-141 retirement.

== Lineage ==
307th Troop Carrier Squadron

- Constituted as the 307th Troop Carrier Squadron on 15 March 1943. Activated on 15 March 1943. Disbanded on 14 April 1944.
- Reconstituted on 19 September 1985 and consolidated with the 707th Military Airlift Squadron as the 707th Military Airlift Squadron

707th Airlift Squadron

- Constituted as the 707th Military Airlift Squadron (Associate) on 13 August 1971 and allotted to the reserves. Activated on 1 October 1972.
- Consolidated on 19 September 1985 with 307th Troop Carrier Squadron Redesignated 707th Airlift Squadron (Associate) on 1 February 1992. Redesignated 707th Airlift Squadron on 1 October 1994. Inactivated 1 July 2000.

=== Assignments ===
- 10th Troop Carrier Group, 15 March 1943 – 14 April 1944
- 943d Military Airlift Group, 1 October 1972
- 315th Military Airlift Wing (later 315th Airlift Wing), 1 July 1973
- 315th Operations Group, 1 August 1992 – 1 July 2000

=== Stations ===
- Baer Field, Indiana, 15 March 1943
- Grenada Army Air Field, Mississippi, 6 May 1943
- Lawson Field, Georgia, 5 June 1943
- Grenada Army Air Field, Mississippi, 28 January 1944
- Alliance Army Air Field, Nebraska, 12 March – 14 April 1944.
- Charleston Air Force Base, South Carolina, 1 October 1972 – 1 July 2000

=== Aircraft ===
- Douglas C-47 Skytrain, 1943–1944
- Douglas C-53 Skytrooper, 1943–1944
- Lockheed C-141 Starlifter, 1972–2000
