= 300th Airlift Squadron =

300th Airlift Squadron

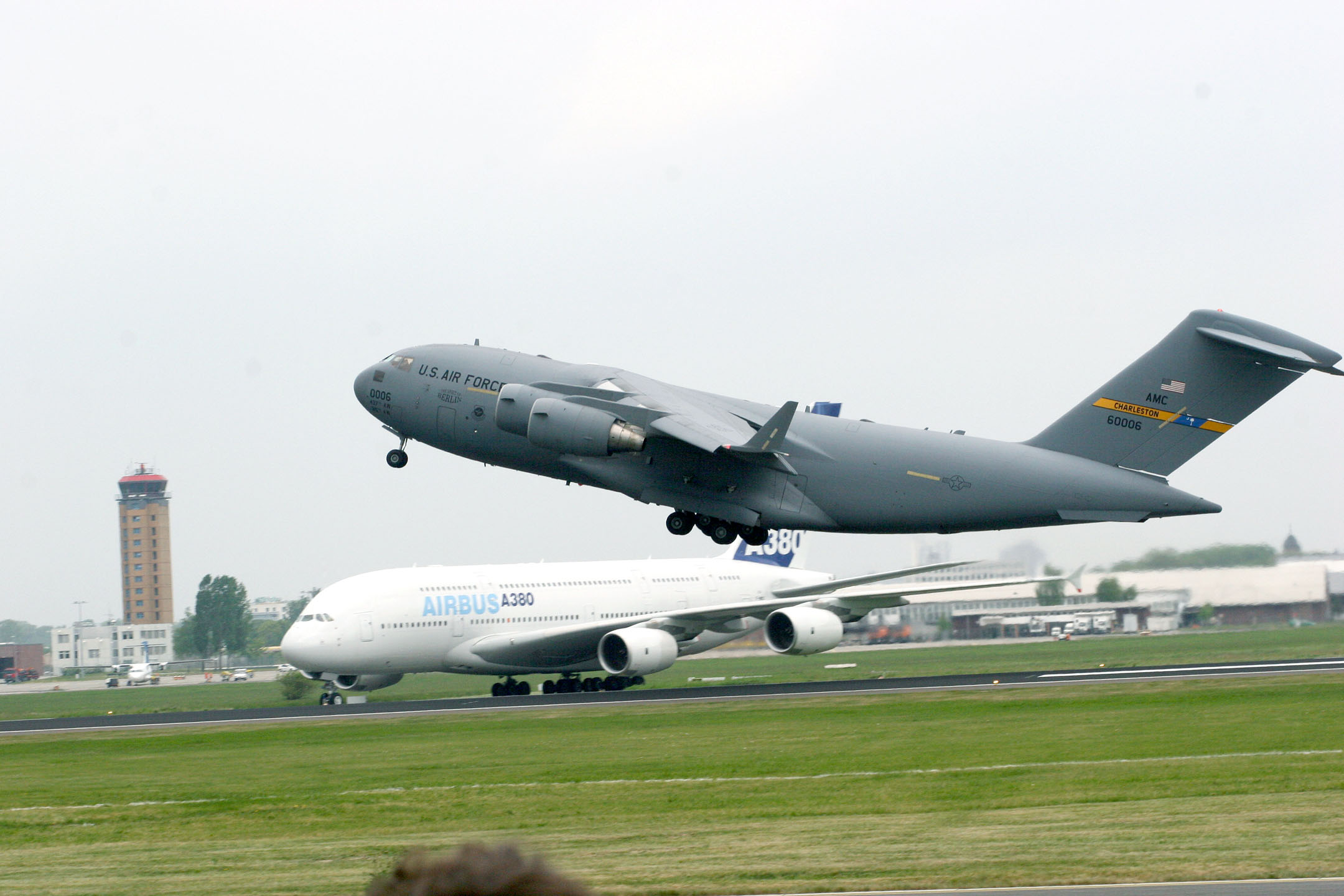
- A Charleston C-17 Globemaster III at the Berlin Airshow
- Active: 1943; 1952–1955; 1969–present
- Country: United States
- Branch: United States Air Force
- Role: Airlift
- Part of: Air Force Reserve Command
- Garrison/HQ: Charleston Air Force Base
- Nickname(s): South Carolina Volunteers South Carolina Privateers
- Motto(s): Ad Astra Latin To the Stars
- Decorations: Air Force Outstanding Unit Award; Republic of Vietnam Gallantry Cross with Palm

Insignia
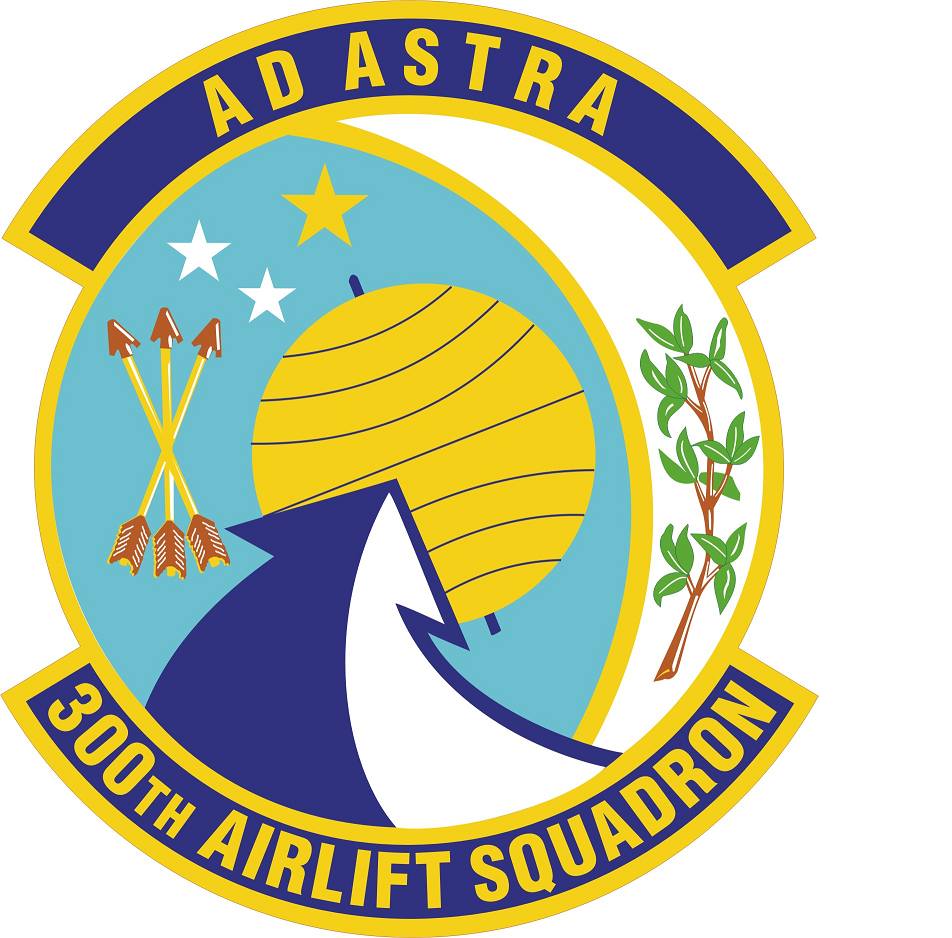
- 300 Military Airlift Sq emblem (approved 25 June 1996)

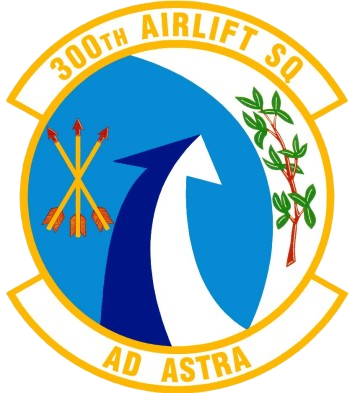
- 300th Military Airlift Squadron emblem (approved 1 August 1978, restored 13 November 2007)

The 300th Airlift Squadron is part of the 315th Airlift Wing at Charleston Air Force Base, South Carolina. It operates Boeing C-17 Globemaster III aircraft supporting the United States Air Force global reach mission worldwide.

== Mission ==
Train and equip C-17 aircrews for global air-land and airdrop operations.

== History ==
=== World War II ===
During World War II the 300th airlifted military supplies from India to Allied forces in Burma and China in 1943.

=== Military Air Transport Service ===
It flew airlift missions within Japan and to Southeast Asia from 1952 to 1955. The squadron airlifted US ex-prisoners of war from Japan to the U.S. following the Korean War and transported French troops wounded in the First Indochina War from Japan to France and Algeria in 1954.

=== Air Force Reserve ===
It has flown worldwide airlift missions since 1969. Specifically, the 300th airlifted U.S. troops to Grenada and U.S. students from Grenada to the U.S. in 1983 and supported the 1989 contingency operation in Panama. Received the Air Force Reserve Aircrew of the Year award twice.

=== Operations ===
- World War II
- Operation Urgent Fury
- Operation Just Cause

1991 mobilized for the Gulf War

== Lineage ==
100th Air Transport Squadron

- Constituted as the 100th Transport Squadron on 4 June 1943

Activated on 21 June 1943
Disbanded on 1 December 1943

- Reconstituted and redesignated 100th Air Transport Squadron, Medium on 20 June 1952

Activated on 20 July 1952
Inactivated on 25 October 1955

- Consolidated with the 300th Military Airlift Squadron as the 300th Military Airlift Squadron on 19 September 1985

300th Airlift Squadron

- Constituted as the 300th Military Airlift Squadron (Associate) on 31 July 1969

Activated in the reserve on 25 September 1969
Consolidated with the 100th Air Transport Squadron on 19 September 1985
Redesignated 300th Airlift Squadron (Associate) on 1 February 1992
Redesignated 300th Airlift Squadron on 1 October 1994

=== Assignments ===
- 29th Transport Group, 21 June – 1 December 1943
- 1503d Air Transport Wing, 20 July 1952
- 1611th Air Transport Group, 9–25 October 1955
- 943d Military Airlift Group, 25 September 1969
- 315th Military Airlift Wing (later 315th Airlift Wing), 1 July 1973
- 315th Operations Group, 1 August 1992 – present

=== Stations ===
- Sookerating Airfield, India, 21 June – 1 December 1943
- Haneda Air Base (later Tokyo International Airport), Japan, 20 Jul 1952 – 8 Oct 1955
- McGuire Air Force Base, New Jersey, 9–25 October 1955
- Charleston Air Force Base, South Carolina, 25 September 1969 – present

=== Aircraft ===
- Douglas C-47 Skytrain (1943)
- Curtiss C-46 Commando (1943)
- Douglas C-54 Skymaster (1952–1955)
- Lockheed C-141 Starlifter (1969–1997)
- McDonnell Douglas C-17 Globemaster III (1997–present)
