= Denton Amendment =

U.S. government humanitarian program

The Denton Amendment, also known as the Denton Cargo Program, is a United States government humanitarian program launched in 1987 that allows for space available on military aircraft to be used to carry humanitarian aid supplies to countries in need and for disaster relief. It was proposed as a change to Title 10 U.S.C. Section 402 by U.S. Senator Jeremiah Denton of Alabama in 1985 to allow for humanitarian aid to be transported internationally, or within the United States at minimal or no added cost to the taxpayers, under the direction of the Secretary of Defense. The program is jointly administered by USAID, the Department of State, the Defense Security Cooperation Agency, and the Department of Defense.

Humanitarian aid cargo is donated by organizations within the United States and handed off to a Denton cargo manager for processing. Cargo must be vetted to ensure it will not conflict with the needs of the intended recipients and will stay off the black market in the countries to which it is delivered, and will not compete with or disadvantage businesses in the location it is delivered.

The primary Denton cargo hub is Joint Base Charleston, South Carolina.
