= 317th Airlift Squadron =

317th Airlift Squadron

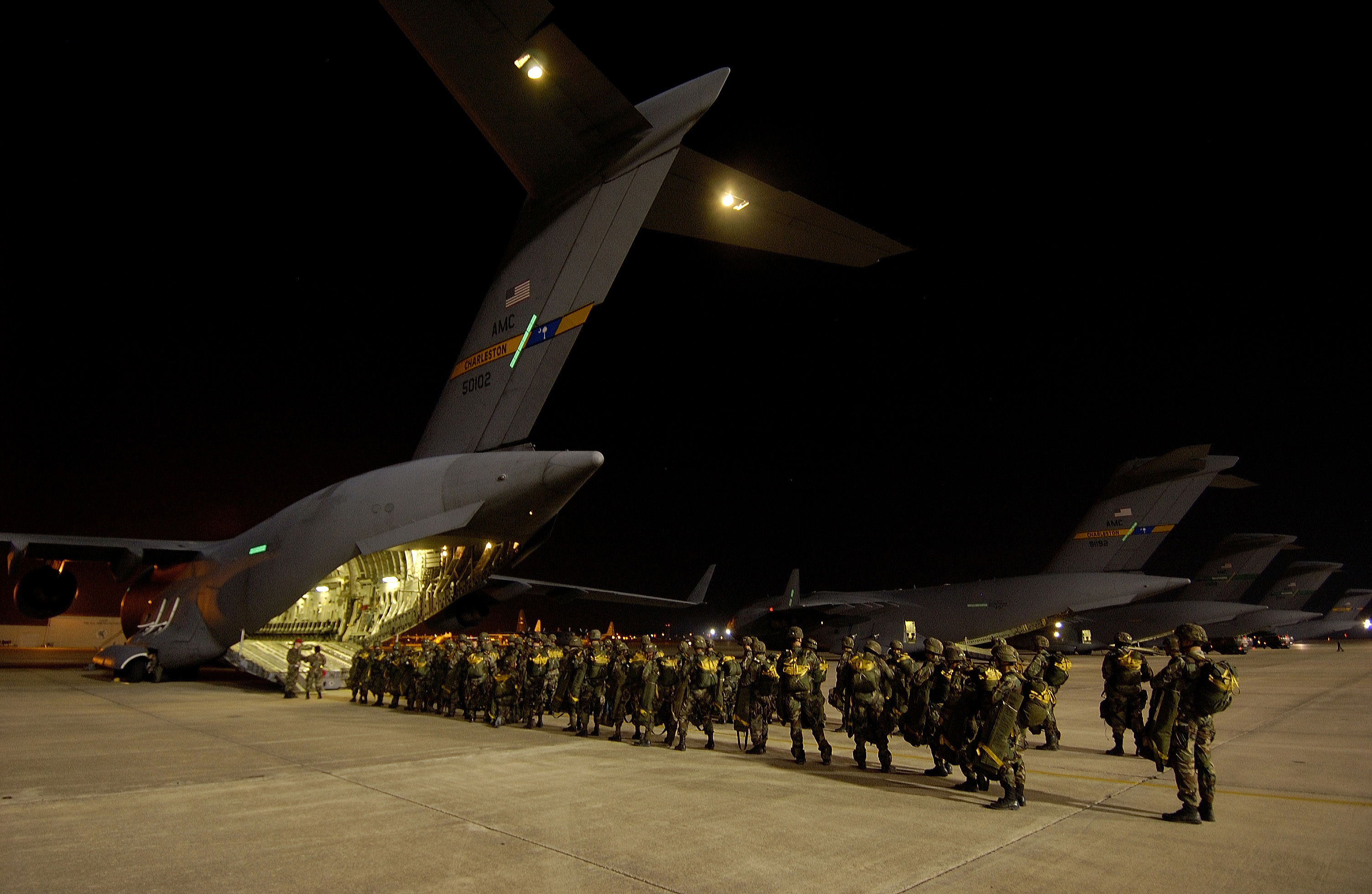
- Paratroopers from the 82d Airborne Division board C-17 Globemaster IIIs from Charleston AFB
- Active: 1943–1944; 1944–1946; 1964–1974; 1992–present
- Country: United States
- Branch: United States Air Force
- Role: Airlift
- Part of: Air Force Reserve Command
- Garrison/HQ: Charleston Air Force Base
- Engagements: China-Burma-India Theater
- Decorations: Air Force Outstanding Unit Award

Commanders
- Current commander: Lieutenant Colonel John Gurrieri

Insignia
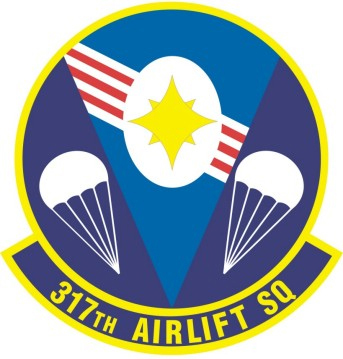
- 317th Airlift Squadron emblem (approved 15 March 1968, revised 23 September 1999)

The 317th Airlift Squadron (317 AS) is part of the 315th Airlift Wing at Charleston Air Force Base, South Carolina. It operates C-17 Globemaster III aircraft supporting the United States Air Force global reach mission worldwide. It continues the histories of three squadrons with airlift missions that bear the number 317.

== Mission ==
The mission of the 317th Airlift Squadron is to recruit, train, and support combat ready aircrews in order to meet global taskings.

== History ==
=== World War II ===
The 317th was first activated as a transport squadron during World War II and airlifted cargo and mail for the Eighth Air Force within the United Kingdom from 1943 to 1944.

The squadron's second activation was as a troop carrier unit. After training in the United States, it moved overseas and airlifted troops and cargo in India and Burma from 11 November 1944 to about August 1945. Through its first eight months in theater, the squadron flew Chinese troops, horses, and mules over The Hump, air dropped supplies, and evacuated wounded. The squadron arrived in theater at a time when British troops were on the offensive in the Chindwin Valley. Because only a few forward airfields were available, a large amount of supplies for these troops had to be airdropped to them. The squadron also airlanded at the forward airfields and evacuated wounded aiding the ground troops in the successful outcome of the campaign.

In December 1944, a decision was made to airlift an entire Chinese division and all of its equipment over The Hump to respond to the Japanese capture of Guilin, which threatened the lifeline to China. The 317th, along with other transport squadrons, spent most of its efforts until 6 January 1945 in supporting this operation, for which it received commendations from the commanding generals of Army Air Forces, India Burma Theater and Tenth Air Force.

The squadron then turned its efforts toward Burma, while its glider section trained British glider pilots. In February, planning was made for glider operations from Sinthe to seize airfields in the Meiktila area. However, British forces seized the airstrip at Thabutkon and after one of the squadron's gliders had landed to inspect the field the squadron began operations to airlift an Indian brigade into the field. For this assault landing the squadron was awarded an arrowhead for its campaign ribbon. In April, the squadron glider section landed eight gliders loaded with engineering equipment into the Lewe airfield to level the field for aircraft operation. An attack the following day by Nakajima Ki-43 "Oscar" fighters resulted in the destruction of five of the gliders. This operation earned the squadron a second arrowhead.

In May 1945, British and Indian forces had driven forward and were closing in on Rangoon. It was determined to conduct an airborne assault to the south of Rangoon to capture or destroy Japanese gun positions. The 317th dropped Gurkha paratroopers at Elephant Point in the first combat airdrop in Asia. The squadron converted from a commando unit in September and provided aerial transportation for US and allied units in China briefly after the war until November 1945.

=== Viet Nam War Era ===
The squadron was again activated as a special operations airlift unit at Hurlburt Field with a mission of training C-123 Provider aircrews for combat in the Vietnam War in 1964. In 1966, the 317th moved to England AFB and a few months later converted to training crews involved in other forms of special air warfare until 1973.

=== Present Day ===
Since reactivation in the Air Force Reserve in the spring of 1992, the squadron has flown worldwide airlift missions. It flew humanitarian airlift missions to Washington DC and New York City, NY, after the terrorist attack on the US, 11 September 2001.

== Lineage ==
317th Transport Squadron

- Constituted as 317th Transport Squadron (Cargo and Mail) on 25 October 1943

Activated on 28 October 1943
Disbanded on 9 April 1944

- Consolidated on 19 September 1985 with 317th Transport Squadron and 317th Special Operations Squadron as 317th Special Operations Squadron

317th Troop Carrier Squadron

- Constituted as 317th Troop Carrier Squadron, Commando on 1 May 1944

Activated on 1 May 1944
Redesignated as 317th Troop Carrier Squadron on 29 September 1945
Inactivated on 28 February 1946

- Reconstituted on 19 September 1985 and consolidated with 317th Troop Carrier Squadron and 317th Special Operations Squadron as 317th Special Operations Squadron

317th Airlift Squadron

- Constituted as 317th Air Commando Squadron, Troop Carrier on 6 April 1964 and activated

Organized on 1 July 1964
Redesignated as 317th Air Commando Squadron, Utility on 15 June 1966
Redesignated as 317th Special Operations Squadron on 8 July 1968
Inactivated on 30 April 1974

- Consolidated on 19 September 1985 and with 317th Troop Carrier Squadron and 317th Transport Squadron
- Redesignated as 317th Airlift Squadron (Associate) on 20 February 1992

Activated on 1 April 1992
Redesignated as 317th Airlift Squadron on 1 October 1994

=== Assignments ===
- Eighth Air Force, 28 October 1943 – 9 April 1944
- 2d Air Commando Group, 1 May 1944
- Tenth Air Force, 10 September 1945
- US Army Forces, India-Burma Theater, ca. January-28 February 1946.
- 1st Air Commando Wing (later 1st Special Operations Wing), 1 July 1964
- 4410th Combat Crew Training Wing, 15 July 1969
- 1st Special Operations Wing, 15 April 1970 – 30 April 1974
- 315th Airlift Wing, 1 April 1992 – present

From:

=== Stations ===
- Camp Griffiss, England (1943–1944)
- Camp Mackall, North Carolina, 1 May 1944
- Alachua Army Air Field, Florida, 7 June 1944
- Dunnellon Army Air Field, Florida, 21 June 1944
- Camp Mackall, North Carolina, 15 August 1944
- Baer Field, Indiana, 29 August 1944 – 10 September 1944
- Sylhet, India, 2 November 1944 (Note: Now Bangla Desh.)

Detachment operated from Tulihal, India, 11 November 1944 – 18 November 1944

- Bikram, India, 30 November 1944
- Myitkyina, Burma, 5 December 1944
- Kalaikunda Airfield, India, 6 January 1945

Detachments operated from Dinjan, India, 8 January 1945 – 13 January 1945, and Bikram, 22 January 1945 – 30 January 1945

- Palel, India, 7 February 1945
- Kalaikunda Airfield, India, 13 April 1945

A detachment operated from Akyab, Burma, 29 April 1945 – 1 May 1945, and Comilla, India, 3 May 1945 – 20 May 1945

- Ledo, India, 1 June 1945
- Liangshan, China, 10 September 1945
- Hsian (Xi'an), China, 25 September 1945
- Kunming Airport, China, 3 November 1945
- Salua Airstrip, India, 10 November 1945
- Hijli Base Area, India, 18 December 1945 (Note: This move was for housing only. The squadron continued to operate from the Salua Airstrip "Abstract, History of 317th Troop Carrier Squadron Dec 1945". Air Force History Index.)
- Titagurh, India, 12 January 1946 – 28 February 1946.
- Hurlburt Field, Florida, 1 July 1964
- England Air Force Base, Louisiana, 15 January 1966
- Hurlburt Field, Florida, 15 April 1970 – 30 April 1974
- Charleston Air Force Base, South Carolina (1992 – present)

From:

=== Decorations ===

Air Force Outstanding Unit Award

1 June 1964 – June 1965
15 April 1970 – 15 April 1971
1 July 1993 – 30 June 1995
1 July 1995 – 30 June 1997

1 July 1998 – 30 June 2000
1 September 1998 – 31 August 2000
11 September 2001 – 30 September 2003
1 August 2005 – 31 July 2007

=== Campaigns ===
- China-Burma-India Theater

India-Burma
China Defensive
Central Burma with two Arrowheads
China Offensive

== Aircraft operated ==
- CG-4 Waco (1944–1945)
- CG-15 Waco (1944–1945)
- C-47 Skytrain (1944–1945, 1966–1970)
- C-46 Commando (1945)
- C-123 Provider (1964–1965, 1972–1973)
- U-10 Super Courier (1966–1973)
- AC-47 Spooky (1967–1968)
- T-28 Trojan (1967–1968)
- UH-1 Iroquois (1970–1974)
- CH-3 Jolly Green Giant (1973–1974)
- C-141 Starlifter (1992–1993)
- C-17 Globemaster III (1993 – present)

From:
