= Michael W. Wooley =

United States Air Force general

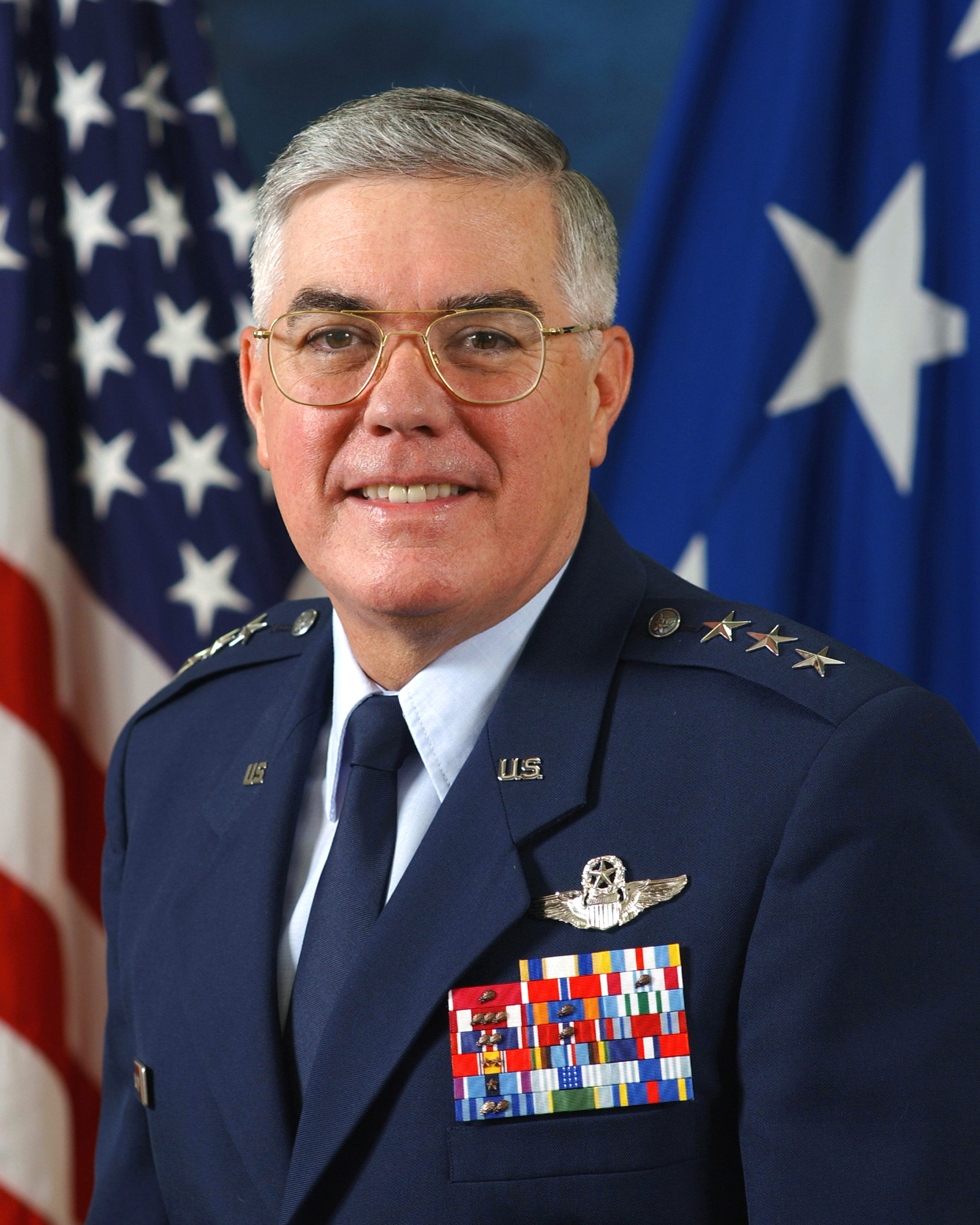
- Alma mater: Northeast Louisiana University; Squadron Officer School Webster University; Air Command and Staff College USAF Air War College; Industrial College of the Armed Forces
- Military career
- Allegiance: United States
- Branch: United States Air Force
- Service years: 1972–2007
- Rank: Lieutenant General
- Commands: Air Force Special Operations Command; Third Air Force; Tanker Airlift Control Center; 86th Airlift Wing; 375th Airlift Wing; 17th Military Airlift Squadron
- Awards: Air Force Distinguished Service Medal; Defense Superior Service Medal; Legion of Merit (2); Bronze Star Medal

Lieutenant General Michael W. Wooley is a retired United States Air Force officer. He finished his career as the commander of the Air Force Special Operations Command (AFSOC), a component of the United States Special Operations Command. At the time of his retirement, the command included approximately 12,900 active-duty, reserve, Air National Guard, and civilian professionals.

== Early life and education ==
Wolley received a Bachelor of Science degree in business administration from Northeast Louisiana University in 1972. He also completed undergraduate pilot training at Vance Air Force Base in Oklahoma. He then attended Squadron Officer School, by correspondence, graduating in 1976.

He received a Master of Science degree in business and management from Webster University in 1981. In 1983, Wooley graduated from the Air Command and Staff College. He graduated from the USAF Air War College in 1985 and the Industrial College of the Armed Forces in 1992.

He completed the Executive Program for General Officers of the Russian Federation and the United States in 1999 and the Black Sea Security Program in 2003, both at the John F. Kennedy School of Government of Harvard University in 1999.

== Military career ==
Wooley is a command pilot with more than 4,000 flying hours. He received his first commission from Officer Training School. He commanded the 17th Military Airlift Squadron, the 375th and 86th Airlift Wings, and the Tanker Airlift Control Center.

At United States Forces Korea, Wooley was responsible for formulating strategy and policy for matters about the Republic of Korea and Northeast Asia. He became the Commander of the Third Air Force which was stationed at the Royal Air Force base in Mildenhall, Suffolk, England.

He was promoted to Brigadier General in 1997, Major General in 2000, and Lieutenant General in 2004. His final commission was as the commander of the Air Force Special Operations Command (AFSOC), a component of the United States Special Operations Command. At the time of his retirement, the command included approximately 12,900 active-duty, reserve, Air National Guard, and civilian professionals.

=== Promotions ===
- Second Lieutenant – September 20, 1972
- First Lieutenant – September 20, 1974
- Captain – September 20, 1976
- Major – December 3, 1980
- Lieutenant Colonel – March 1, 1986
- Colonel – November 1, 1991
- Brigadier General – September 1, 1997
- Major General – October 1, 2000
- Lieutenant General – August 1, 2004

=== Assignments ===
- October 1972–September 1973: student and distinguished graduate enrolled in undergraduate pilot training at Vance Air Force Base in Oklahoma
- October 1973–November 1974: C-141 tanker and transport unit training at Altus Air Force Base in Oklahoma; land survival training at Fairchild Air Force Base in Washington; and water survival training at Homestead Air Force Base in Florida
- November 1974–May 1979: C-141A co-pilot, first pilot, aircraft commander, instructor, and aide-de-camp with the 20th Military Airlift Squadron at the Charleston Air Force Base in South Carolina
- May 1979–August 1982: readiness initiatives analyst with the headquarters of Military Airlift Command at Scott Air Force Base in Illinois
- August 1982–June 1983: student at the Air Command and Staff College at Maxwell Air Force Base in Alabama
- June 1983–February 1984: C-141 pilot with the 41st Military Airlift Squadron at the Charleston Air Force Base in South Carolina
- February 1984–February 1985: C-141 assistant chief pilot and special airlift mission planner with the 41st Military Airlift Squadron at the Charleston Air Force Base
- February 1985–June 1985: chief of current operations and airlift director with the 41st Military Airlift Squadron at the Charleston Air Force Base
- June 1985–August 1987: assistant operations officer and, later, operations officer with the 41st Military Airlift Squadron at the Charleston Air Force Base
- August 1987–July 1989: commander of the 17th Airlift Squadron at the Charleston Air Force Base
- July 1989–April 1990: chief of the Foreign Clearance Section and chief of the International Treaties Section of the Arms Control and International Negotiations Division of the Directorate of Plans, Deputy Chief of Staff for Plans and Operations at the Headquarters of the U.S. Air Force in Washington, D.C.
- April 1990–August 1991: secretary for Joint Chiefs of Staff and National Security Council Matters of the Directorate of Plans, Deputy Chief of Staff for Plans and Operations at the Headquarters of the U.S. Air Force in Washington, D.C.
- August 1991–July 1992: student at the Industrial College of the Armed Forces at Fort Lesley J. McNair in Washington, D.C.
- July 1992–August 1994: chief of strategy and policy with U.S. Forces Korea at the Yongsan Army Garrison in Seoul, South Korea
- August 1994–November 1995: chief of the Inspections Division with the Office of the Inspector General, Headquarters Air Mobility Command at Scott Air Force Base in Illinois
- November 1995–May 1997: commander of the 375th Airlift Wing at Scott Air Force Base
- May 1997–July 1998: vice commander of the Air Force Special Operations Command at Hurlburt Field in Florida
- July 1998–January 2000: commander of the 86th Airlift Wing and Kaiserslautern Military Community at Ramstein Airbase in Germany
- January 2000–June 2002: commander of the Tanker Airlift Control Center, Headquarters Air Mobility Command at Scott Air Force Base
- June 2002–June 2004: commander of the Third Air Force at the Royal Air Force base in Mildenhall, Suffolk, England
- July 2004–November 2007: commander of Air Force Special Operations Command at Hurlburt Field in Florida

=== Flight information ===
Wooley is rated as a command pilot. He has accumulated more than 4,000 flight hours. He has flown the following aircraft:

- Bell Boeing CV-22 Osprey
- Learjet C-21
- Lockheed AC-130H
- Lockheed C-130E Hercules
- Lockheed C-141A/B Starlifter
- Lockheed EC-130E
- Lockheed MC-130E
- McDonnell Douglas C-9A Nightingale
- Pilatus U-28A Draco
- Sikorsky MH-53J
- Sikorsky MH-60G Hawk

== Awards and decorations ==
US Air Force Command Pilot Badge

Air Force Distinguished Service Medal
Defense Superior Service Medal
Legion of Merit with one bronze oak leaf cluster
Bronze Star Medal
Defense Meritorious Service Medal with oak leaf cluster
Meritorious Service Medal with three oak leaf clusters
Air Medal with oak leaf cluster
Joint Service Commendation Medal
Air Force Outstanding Unit Award with two oak leaf clusters
Air Force Organizational Excellence Award with oak leaf cluster
Combat Readiness Medal
National Defense Service Medal with two bronze service stars
Armed Forces Expeditionary Medal
Kosovo Campaign Medal
Humanitarian Service Medal with service star
Air Force Overseas Short Tour Service Ribbon
Air Force Overseas Long Tour Service Ribbon
Air Force Longevity Service Award with one silver and two bronze oak leaf clusters
Small Arms Expert Marksmanship Ribbon
Air Force Training Ribbon
Order of National Security Merit Sam-Il Medal (Republic of Korea)
