= 437th Airlift Wing =

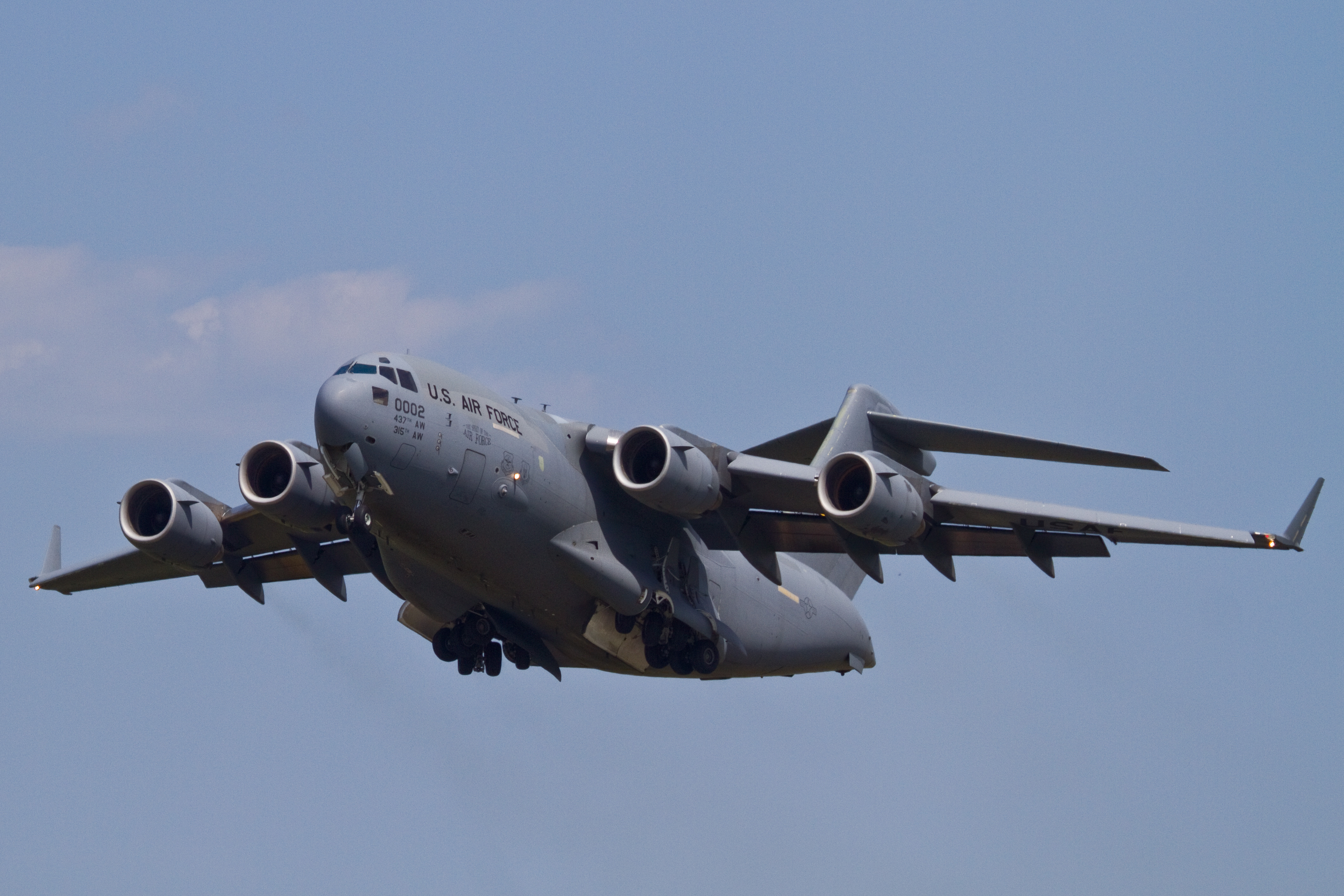
- 437th Airlift Wing C-17A Globemaster III
- Active: 10 May 1949 - Present
- Country: United States
- Branch: United States Air Force
- Type: Wing
- Role: Airlift
- Size: 47 - C-17A Globemaster III
- Part of: Air Mobility Command
- Garrison/HQ: Charleston Air Force Base, SC
- Mottos: Safely provide precise, reliable airlift...anywhere, anytime!
- Mascot: Minuteman
- Engagements: World War II; European Campaign (1944 - 1945): Korean War (1950 - 1952); Vietnam War (1955-1975); Operation Urgent Fury, Grenada (24 October - 19 December 1983); Operation Just Cause, Panama (18 - 29 December 1989); Persian Gulf War (1990 - 1995); Global war on terrorism (2001 - Present)
- Decorations: Distinguished Unit Citation; Air Force Meritorious Unit Award; Air Force Outstanding Unit Award; Republic of Korea Presidential Unit Citation

Commanders
- Current commander: Colonel Patrick K. McClintock
- Command Chief: Chief Master Sergeant James Cromwell

Insignia
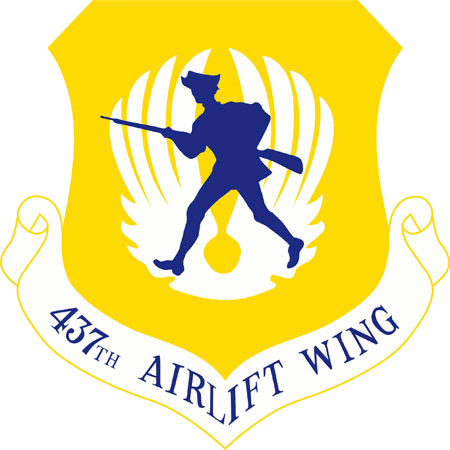
- 437th Airlift Wing Emblem

Aircraft flown
- Transport: C-17 Globemaster III

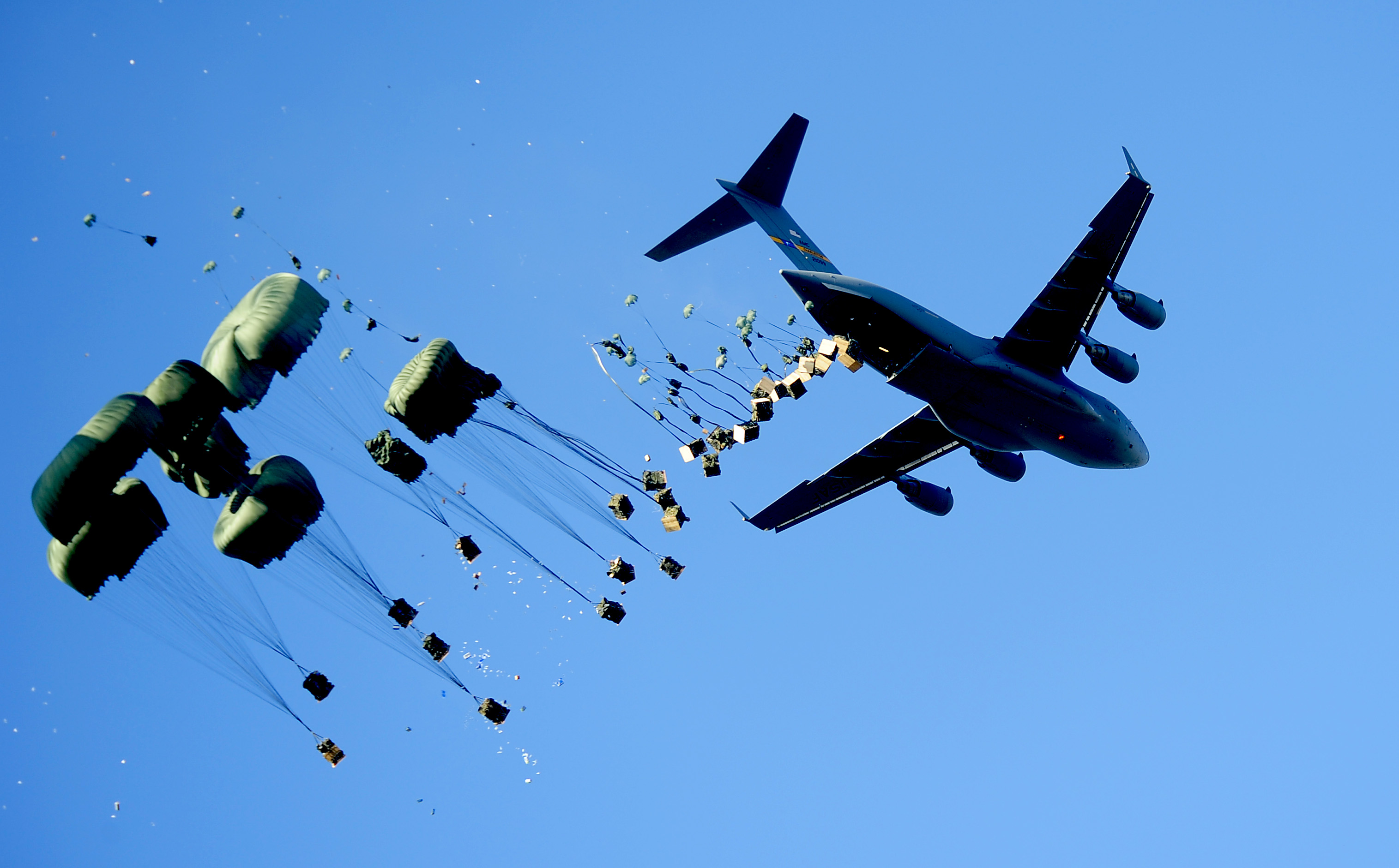
C-17 of the 437th AW airdrops pallets of water and food to Mirebalais, Haiti, 21 Jan 2010

The 437th Airlift Wing (437 AW) is an active unit of the United States Air Force, assigned to 21st Air Force, Air Mobility Command. It is the mission wing at Charleston Air Force Base, Joint Base Lindsey Graham (former Joint Base Charleston), in the City of North Charleston, South Carolina.

The 437 AW is responsible for flying and maintaining the C-17 Globemaster III jet cargo aircraft. Its mission is to command assigned airlift and supporting units; provide for the airlift of troops and passengers, military equipment, cargo and aeromedical airlift and to participate in operations involving the airland or airdrop of troops, equipment and supplies when required.

== Units ==
437th Operations Group (437 OG)

- 14th Airlift Squadron (14 AS)
- 15th Airlift Squadron (15 AS)
- 16th Airlift Squadron (16 AS)
- 437th Special Operations Squadron (437 SOS)
- 437th Operations Support Squadron (437 OSS)

437th Maintenance Group (437 MXG)

- 437th Aerial Port Squadron (437 APS)
- 437th Aircraft Maintenance Squadron (437 AMXS)
- 437th Maintenance Operations Squadron (437 MOS)
- 437th Maintenance Squadron (437 MXS)

== History ==
For additional lineage and history, see 437th Operations Group

Established as 437 Troop Carrier Group on 15 Apr 1943 and activated on 1 May 1943. The unit trained with cargo planes in Indiana, Missouri, and North Carolina. In Jan 1944, the group deployed to England, where it prepared for the invasion of Nazi-occupied Europe.

During the Normandy campaign, the 437 released gliders over Cherbourg Naval Base and carried troops, weapons, ammunition, rations, and other supplies for the 82nd Airborne Division during Operation Neptune. The group received a Distinguished Unit Citation (DUC) for these actions. The group deployed to Italy in Jul 1944 and participated in Operation Dragoon, the Allied invasion of southern France in Aug 1944 dropping paratroops of the 1st Airborne Task Force.

During Operation Market Garden in Sep 1944, the group released gliders carrying troops and equipment for the airborne attack in the occupied Netherlands. In Dec 1944, the group re-supplied the 101st Airborne Division in the Bastogne area of Belgium during the Battle of the Bulge. After moving to France in Feb 1945, the unit released gliders in support of an American crossing of the Rhine River called Operation Varsity on 24 March 1945. The 437 Troop Carrier Group continued supplying American forces until the end of the war. After victory in Europe in May 1945, the group evacuated prisoners of war and displaced persons.

=== Korean War ===
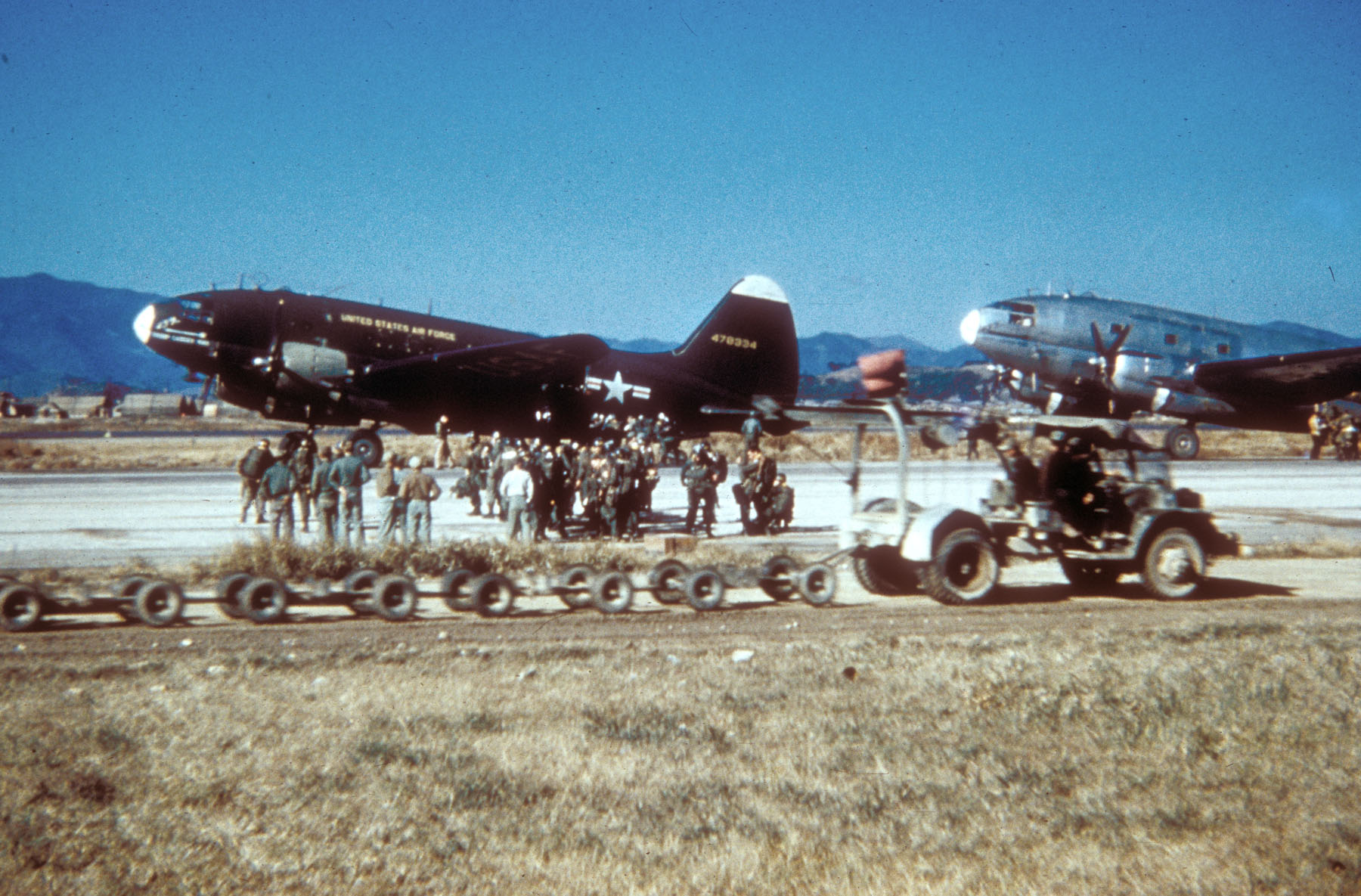
437th Troop Carrier Wing C-46Ds during the Korean War.

The 437th stood up as a wing and trained in the reserve from June 1949 to August 1950. On 15 August 1950, the main contingent of the 437th Troop Carrier Wing was called up for active service in the Korean War.

Moved to Shaw AFB, South Carolina, At that time 1,441 men were assigned to the 437th Troop Carrier Wing, and began a training program. On 15 October, the day before the 437th left Shaw, it got up to its full wartime strength of 1,569. Most of the additional men came from the Regular Air Force, including 60 from Sewart AFB, Tennessee, and another 59 fresh from basic training at Lackland AFB. The Wing had a total of forty-eight C-46s, obtained from various units.

Augmented by a few maintenance personnel, the command and operations elements of the wing deployed their C-46s to Japan. They arrived at Brady AB, Kyushu, Japan, at sundown on 8 November, just as the main body of the wing, which had crossed the Pacific aboard ship, marched in from the railroad station. The maintenance force quickly removed the long-range fuel tanks which had been installed for the overwater flight. Thirty-six hours after the first plane had landed, the 437th Troop Carrier Wing sent its first three planes on a routine combat cargo mission to Pyongyang Airfield (K-21) in North Korea, at the time under United Nations control.

The 437th Troop Carrier Wing conducted operations for Combat Cargo Command, a provisional organization assigned to the Fifth Air Force, for support and administration. During the last 52 days of 1950, the wing flew almost 3,500 hours, conducting more than 1,500 effective combat sorties carrying passengers, cargo, or patients. When the 437th arrived in the theater, United Nations forces were driving north, and the U.S. Air Force was using airfields at Sinanju and Yonpo in North Korea. As the Chinese Communist forces struck south, however, the 437th helped evacuate these bases. Soon 437th aircrews were helping move everything out of the airstrips near Pyongyang, and by year's end they were evacuating Kimpo Air Base near Seoul, South Korea.

In December 1950, the 437th acquired the responsibility for conducting Combat Cargo Command's scheduled courier operation, connecting all the major Japanese and Korean air bases and strips. As the U.N. forces pressed their attack in the early months of 1951, it became necessary to augment the Army's overburdened supply system with airdrops of supplies. On 24 February the 437th conducted the first of many missions to resupply frontline U.S. Eighth Army troops. The wing participated in its first combat personnel airborne drop on 23 March 1951, at Munsan-ni. The unit and the C-119 Flying Boxcar-equipped 314th Troop Carrier Wing conducted a week's intensive training preparing to drop the 187th Regimental Combat Team at Chunchon. Then on 21 March, forty-eight hours before it was to go, the mission was changed, not an unusual circumstance in fluid battlefield conditions. The 187th was now to be dropped at Munsan-ni instead of Chunchon, and that, on the morning of the 23d, not the 21st.

Weather on the 23d was perfect, and for 30 minutes before the drop, B-26s of the 3d and 452d Bomb Wings softened up the objective area with 500-pound air-burst bombs and low-level strafing and rocket attacks. In addition to 55 C-46s, the 437th provided several crew members who had recently transitioned into C-119s to augment the 314th's crews. The wing's planes dropped 1,446 troops and 15 1/2 tons of ammunition, food, and signal equipment. Enemy interference was meager, and the wing suffered no injuries to personnel nor damage to aircraft.

On 25 January 1951, Far East Air Forces discontinued Combat Cargo Command and activated the 315th Air Division (Combat Cargo). Like its predecessor, the 315th was directly subordinated to Far East Air Forces. The 437th Troop Carrier Wing's tour of active military service ended on 10 June 1952, when it was inactivated and returned to the control of the Air Force Reserve. Its personnel, then all active force replacements, and its equipment were transferred to the concurrently activated 315th Troop Carrier Wing (Medium) at Brady AB, Japan.

=== Cold War ===
The 1608th Air Transport Wing based at Charleston AFB S.C. flew cargo support missions throughout the world from 1955 to 1966 which included among others downrange support for the space missions in the early 60's transporting the space capsules back to Cape Canaveral.

During this period the 1608th consisted of the 3rd and 17th Air Transport Squadrons flying C-124s and the 41st and 76th squadrons flying C-130s. The 3rd squadrons C-124s performed troop airlift missions moving U.N troops from Europe to the combat zones of the Congo War in 1961. The 1608th's aircraft were instrumental in providing airlift for the Vietnam War buildup in the early 60s.

Missions involving Panama, Granada, the planned invasion of Cuba and other hot spots in the world were performed by the 1608th during this time period.

The 437th Military Airlift Wing replaced the 1608th Air Transport Wing, in 1966, as the Military Airlift Command host wing at Charleston Air Force Base, South Carolina. It has since flown joint training missions with Army forces, aeromedical evacuation missions, mercy and humanitarian missions as needed, and airlifted personnel, cargo, and mail worldwide, primarily to Europe, the Middle East and Africa, but also to South America. The 437th converted from the C-124 Globemaster to the C-141 Starlifter in 1965 and was the first Air Force unit to receive the C-5 Galaxy in 1970. The wing flew both aircraft until 1973 when its C-5s were transferred to Dover AFB, Delaware and Dovers C-141s were moved to Charleston. It has participated in numerous tactical operations and exercises, particularly those of NATO. Wing aircrews have been augmented by attached Reserve aircrews from the 315th Airlift Wing. From 1966 to the early 1970s, the wing also flew numerous missions to the Far East and Southeast Asia.

The wing deployed support personnel and provided airlift of personnel and equipment for operations in Grenada, 24 October–19 December 1983; Panama, 18–29 December 1989, and added Russia as a special mission destination in 1988.

=== The 1990s and beyond ===
The wing airlifted personnel and equipment and provided support personnel after the Iraqi invasion of Kuwait in 1990, and in the leadup to the Gulf War of 1991. It flew humanitarian missions to Russia in 1992, and to Somalia and other regions of Africa from 1992 to 1994.

The 437th received its first C-17 in June 1993. It routinely supported humanitarian and contingency operations in the Balkans, 1993–1999. The wing has also conducted long range humanitarian air drops into Afghanistan during Operation Enduring Freedom beginning in October 2001 and later regularly supported deployments to other Global War on Terrorism operations, as well as Operation Iraqi Freedom from March 2003. On 8 January 2010, the 437th transferred host unit responsibilities to the newly established 628th Air Base Wing as part of the Department of Defense Joint Basing Initiative. The 437th Airlift Wing remains at Charleston Air Force Base as the supported Mission wing.

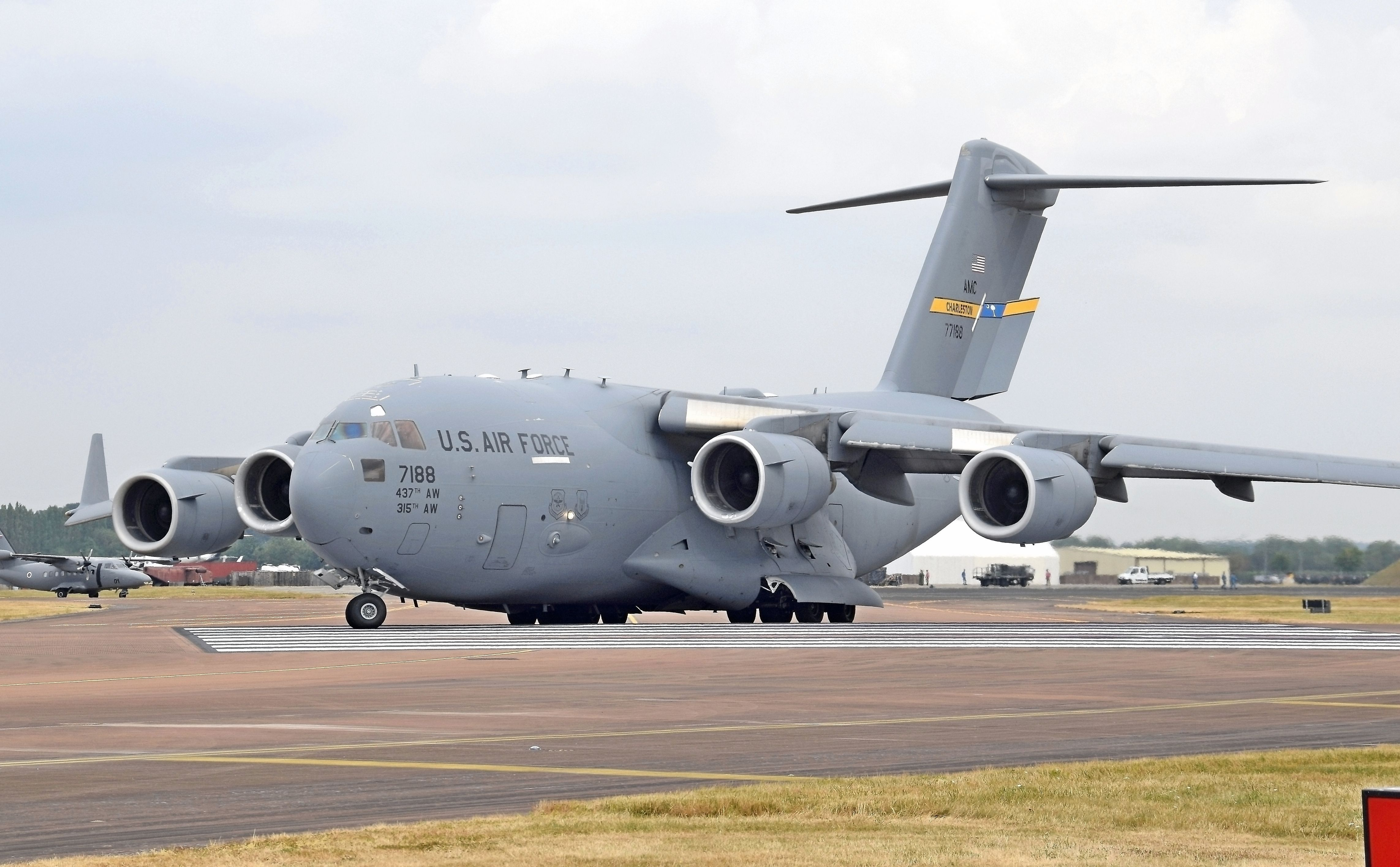
Boeing C-17 Globemaster III of the 437th Airlift Wing taxiing for departure at the 2018 RIAT, England

=== Lineage ===
- Established as 437th Troop Carrier Wing, Medium, on 10 May 1949

Activated in the Reserve on 27 June 1949
Ordered to active service on 10 August 1950
Inactivated on 10 June 1952

- Activated in the Reserve on 15 June 1952

Inactivated on 16 November 1957

- Redesignated 437th Military Airlift Wing, and activated, on 27 December 1965

Organized on 8 January 1966, assuming personnel and equipment of 1608th Air Transport Wing (MATS) which was discontinued.
Redesignated 437th Airlift Wing on 1 October 1991.
Support functions incorporated into the 628th Air Base Wing On 8 January 2010.

=== Assignments ===
- Tenth Air Force, 26 June 1949
- Tactical Air Command, 14 August 1950
- Fifth Air Force, 8 November 1950

Attached to FEAF Combat Cargo Command, Provisional, 8 November 1950–

- 314th Air Division, 1 December 1950

Remained attached to FEAF Combat Cargo Command, Provisional, through 24 January 1951

- 315th Air Division (Combat Cargo), 25 January 1951 – 10 June 1952
- Tenth Air Force, 15 June 1952 – 16 November 1957
- Military Air Transport Service (later, Military Airlift Command), 27 December 1965
- Twenty-First Air Force, 8 January 1966 – 1 October 2003
- Eighteenth Air Force, 1 October 2003–present

=== Components ===
Groups

- 437th Troop Carrier (later, Operations) Group: 27 June 1949 – 10 June 1952; 15 June 1952 – 16 November 1957; 1 October 1991–present

Squadrons

- 3d Military Airlift Squadron: 8 January 1966 – 1 August 1973
- 17th Military Airlift Squadron: 8 January 1966 – 8 April 1969; 1 August 1987 – 1 October 1991
- 20th Military Airlift Squadron: 1 August 1973 – 1 October 1991
- 41st Military Airlift Squadron: 8 January 1966 – 1 October 1991
- 76th Military Airlift Squadron: 8 January 1966 – 1 October 1991
- 1300th Military Airlift Squadron: 1 March 1978 – 1 December 1982

=== Stations ===
- Chicago-Orchard Airport (later, O'Hare Field-Chicago International Airport), Illinois, 27 June 1949
- Shaw AFB, South Carolina, 14 August–16 October 1950
- Brady Air Base, Japan, 8 November 1950 – 10 June 1952
- O'Hare International Airport, Illinois, 15 June 1952 – 16 November 1957
- Charleston AFB, South Carolina, 8 January 1966–present)

=== Aircraft ===
- C-46 Commando, 1949–1952; 1952–1957
- C-47 Skytrain, 1955–1957
- C-119 Flying Boxcar, 1957
- C-124 Globemaster II, 1966–1969
- C-130 Hercules, 1966–1967
- C-141 Starlifter, 1966–2000
- C-5 Galaxy 1970–1973
- C-17 Globemaster III, 1993–present

== Expeditions ==
- Korean War
- Vietnam War
- Operation Urgent Fury
- Operation Just Cause
- Operation Desert Shield
- Operation Desert Storm
- Operation Enduring Freedom
- Operation Iraqi Freedom
- Operation New Dawn

== Unit shields ==
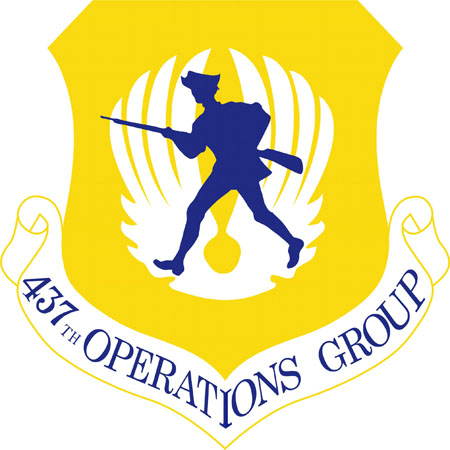
437 OG

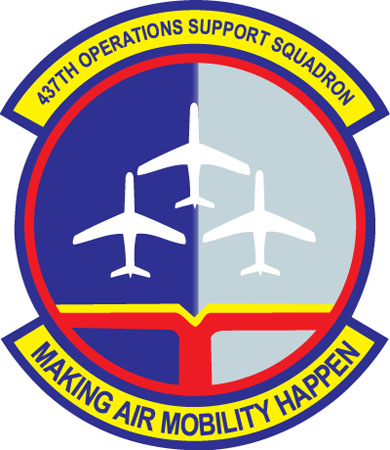
437 OSS

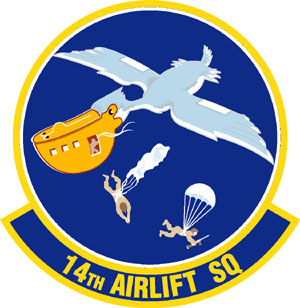
14 AS

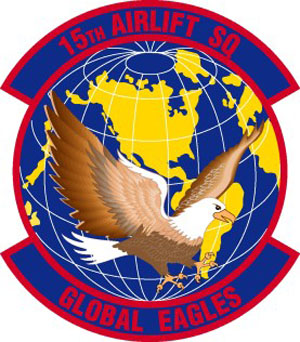
15 AS

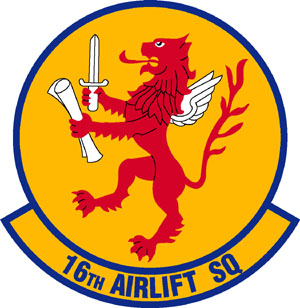
16 AS

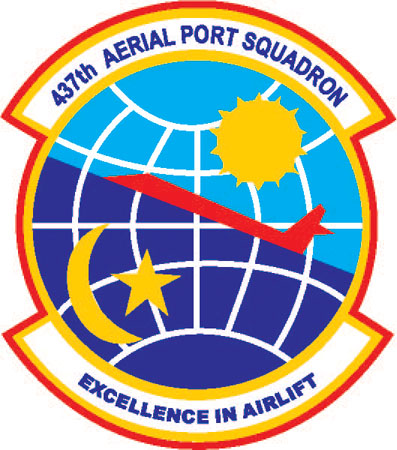
437 APS

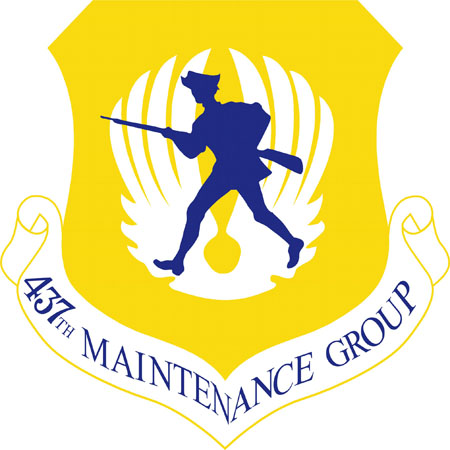
437 MXG

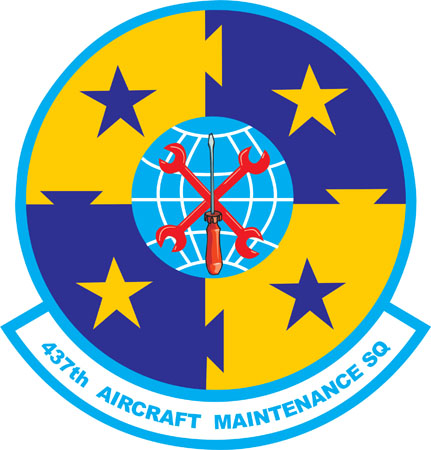
437 AMXS

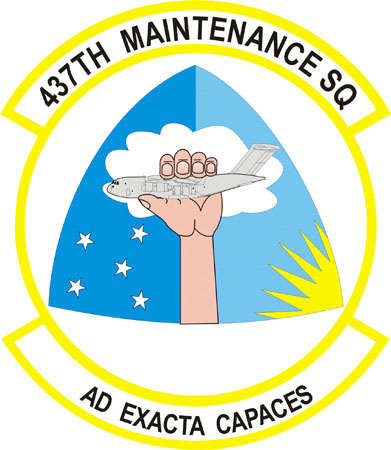
437 MXS

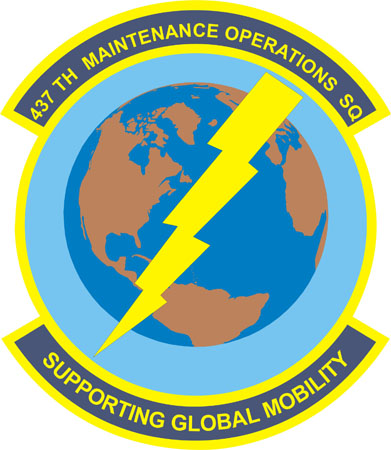
437 MOS
