= 76th Airlift Squadron =

76th Airlift Squadron

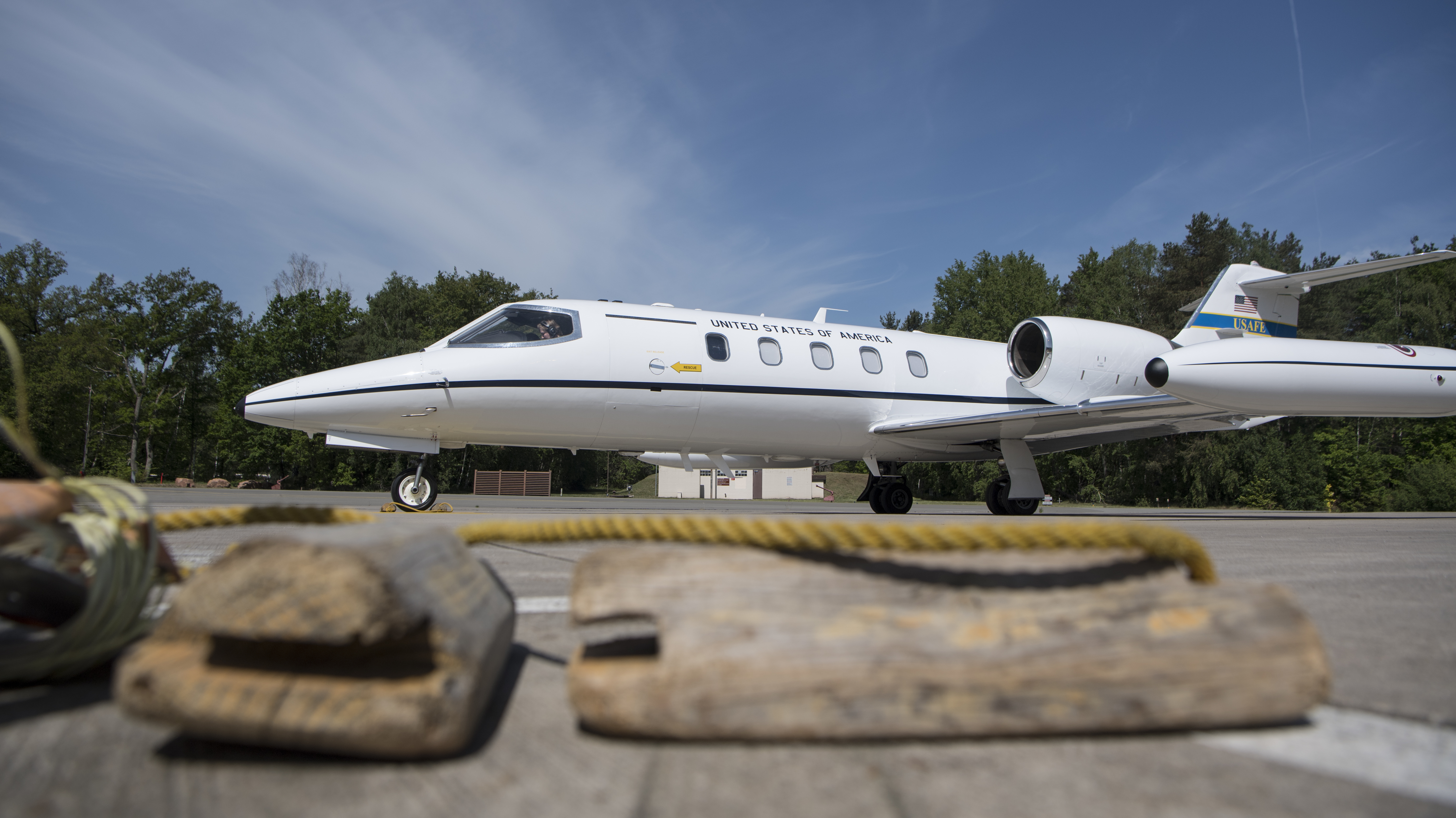
- A squadron Learjet C-21A at Ramstein AB in 2020
- Active: 1943–1944; 1952–present
- Country: United States
- Branch: United States Air Force
- Role: Airlift
- Part of: United States Air Forces in Europe – Air Forces Africa: Third Air Force; 86th Airlift Wing; 86th Operations Group
- Garrison/HQ: Ramstein Air Base, Germany
- Motto: Safety Spirit Service
- Engagements: Persian Gulf War
- Decorations: Air Force Outstanding Unit Award with Combat "V" Device; Air Force Outstanding Unit Award; Republic of Vietnam Gallantry Cross with Palm

Insignia
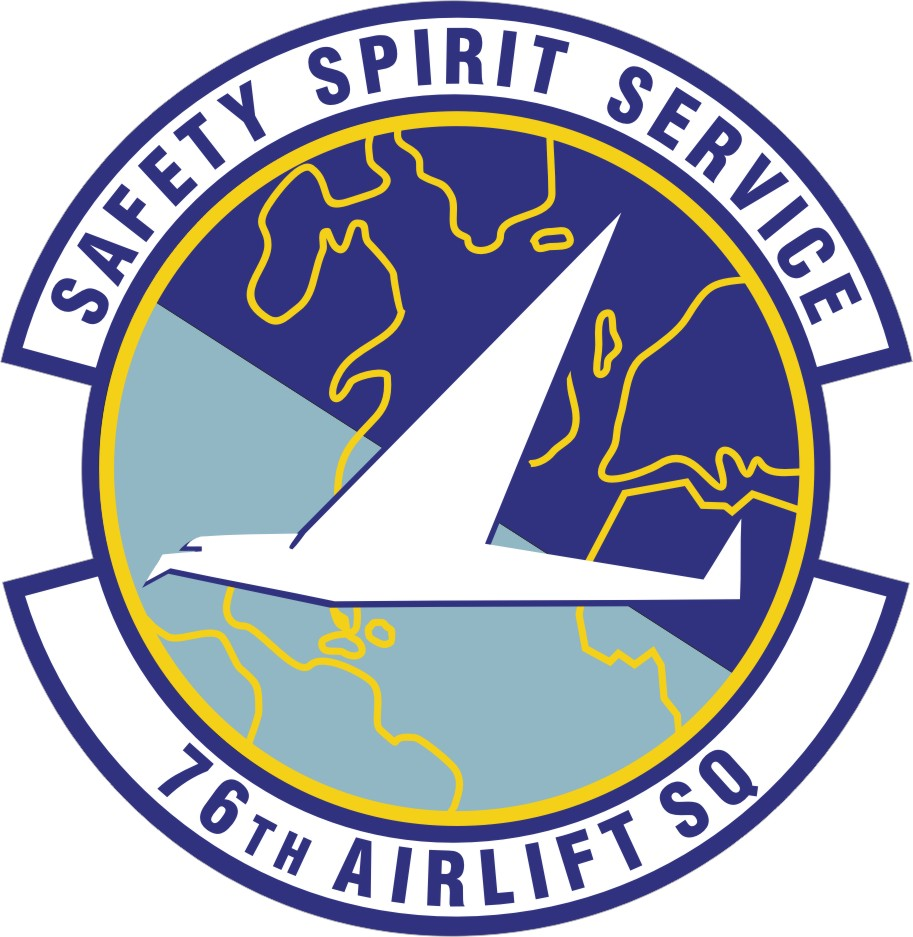
- 76th Airlift Squadron emblem (approved 11 February 1958)

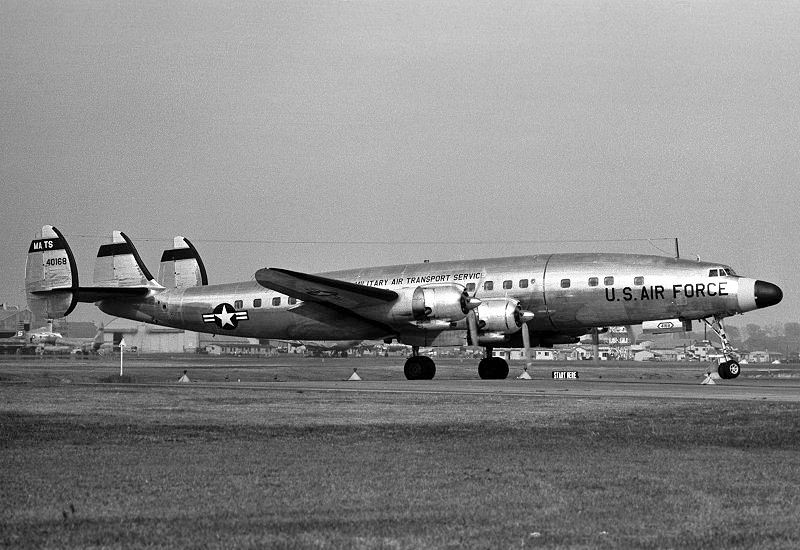
Lockheed C-121C-LO Super Constellation 54-0168

The 76th Airlift Squadron is part of the 86th Airlift Wing at Ramstein Air Base, Germany. It operates executive airlift aircraft, including the Learjet C-21A and Gulfstream C-37A Gulfstream V.

The squadron was first activated during World War II as the 76th Ferrying Squadron its primary mission was training aircrews on transport aircraft and it was redesignated the 76th Transport Transition Squadron in 1943. The squadron was disbanded in a general reorganization of Army Air Forces training units in the spring of 1944.

The squadron was reconstituted as the 76th Air Transport Squadron in July 1952, flying the Douglas C-54 Skymasters it had flown during the war. When Military Air Transport Service ended its airlift operations at Kelly Air Force Base, Texas in 1956, the squadron moved to Charleston Air Force Base, South Carolina, from which it performed global airlift missions until 1993, when it moved to Ramstein and assumed its current mission.

== Mission ==
Conduct executive airlift missions.

== History ==
=== World War II ===
The squadron was first activated in February 1943 at Homestead Army Air Base, Florida as the 76th Ferrying Squadron. It trained flight crews on a variety of multi-engine transport aircraft as part of Air Transport Command's 2d Operational Training Unit (OTU). Despite its name, the 2d OTU acted primarily as a Replacement Training Unit, training pilots and aircrews, although just before it was disbanded, the first three Bomber Support Squadrons were activated at Homestead. However, the Army Air Forces found that standard military units, based on relatively inflexible tables of organization were not well adapted to the training mission. Accordingly, it adopted a more functional system in which each base was organized into a separate numbered unit. The 2d OTU and its components were disbanded and replaced at Homestead by the 563d AAF Base Unit, which continued the transport training mission for the remainder of the war.

=== Global Airlift ===
The squadron was reconstituted as the 76th Air Transport Squadron and activated with Douglas C-54 Skymasters at Kelly Air Force Base, Texas in July 1952, replacing the 1289th Air Transport Squadron, which was simultaneously discontinued. As Military Air Transport Service increasingly moved its airlift operations from the central United States to the coasts and the Skymaster was withdrawn from service, the squadron moved to Charleston Air Force Base, South Carolina in February 1956 and began to operate Lockheed C-121 Constellations. The squadron transported United Nations troops during the Suez Crisis in November 1956. As the 76th Military Airlift Squadron, it supported operations in Southeast Asia from 1966 through 1973, and later participated in the evacuation of Saigon in May 1975. It participated in Operation Urgent Fury, the 1983 replacement of a revolutionary government of Grenada with a constitutional one, and in Operation Just Cause, the 1989 incursion into Panama to oust Manuel Noriega. It provided airlift for The Gulf War from August 1990 through December 1991. The squadron moved to Ramstein Air Base, Germany as the number of Lockheed C-141 Starlifters at Charleston was reduced.

=== Executive airlift ===
At Ramstein, the squadron has provided operational support airlift with a variety of passenger aircraft.

==== Secretary of Commerce Incident ====
On 3 April 1996, 76th Boeing CT-43 Bobcat (Flight IFO-21) crashed on approach to Dubrovnik Airport, Croatia, while on an official trade mission. The aircraft, originally built as T-43A navigational trainer and later converted into an executive transport aircraft, was carrying United States Secretary of Commerce Ron Brown and 34 other people, including The New York Times Frankfurt bureau chief Nathaniel C. Nash. While attempting an instrument approach, the airplane crashed into a mountainside. Air Force Technical Sergeant Shelly Kelly survived the initial impact, but died en route to hospital. Everyone else on board died at the scene of the crash. Unlike civilian 737s, the military CT-43A version was equipped with neither a flight data recorder nor a cockpit voice recorder.

== Lineage ==
- Constituted as the 76th Ferrying Squadron (Special) on 30 January 1943

Activated on 8 February 1943
Redesignated as 76th Transport Transition Squadron on 4 June 1943
Disbanded on 31 March 1944

- Reconstituted and redesignated 76th Air Transport Squadron, Medium on 20 June 1952

Activated on 20 July 1952
Redesignated 76th Military Airlift Squadron on 8 January 1966
Redesignated 76th Airlift Squadron on 1 October 1991

=== Assignments ===
- 2d Operational Training Unit, 8 February 1943 – 31 March 1944
- 1700th Air Transport Group, 20 July 1952
- 1608th Air Transport Group, 1 February 1956
- 1608th Air Transport Wing, 18 January 1963
- 437th Military Airlift Wing, 8 January 1966
- 437th Operations Group, 1 October 1991
- 86th Operations Group, 1 October 1993 – present

=== Stations ===
- Homestead Army Air Base, Florida, 8 February 1943 – 31 March 1944
- Kelly Air Force Base, Texas, 20 July 1952
- Charleston Air Force Base, South Carolina, 1 February 1956
- Ramstein Air Base, Germany, 1 October 1993 – present

=== Aircraft ===
- Douglas C-49 (1943)
- Cessna AT-17 Bobcat (1943)
- Curtiss C-46 Commando (1943)
- Douglas C-54 Skymaster (1943–1944, 1952–1956)
- Lockheed C-60 Lodestar (1943–1944)
- Consolidated C-87 Liberator Express (1943–1944)
- Consolidated B-24 Liberator (1943–1944)
- Lockheed C-121 Constellation (1956–1963)
- Lockheed C-130 Hercules (1963–1966)
- Lockheed C-141 Starlifter (1966–1993)
- Gulfstream C-20A (1993-2002)
- Gulfstream C-20H (2002–2017)
- Learjet C-21A (1993–present)
- Gulfstream C-37A Gulfstream V (2010–present)
- Boeing C-40B Clipper (2005–2019)
- Boeing CT-43 Bobcat (1993–96)
- McDonnell Douglas VC-9A (1996-2003)
