= 1608th Air Transport Wing =

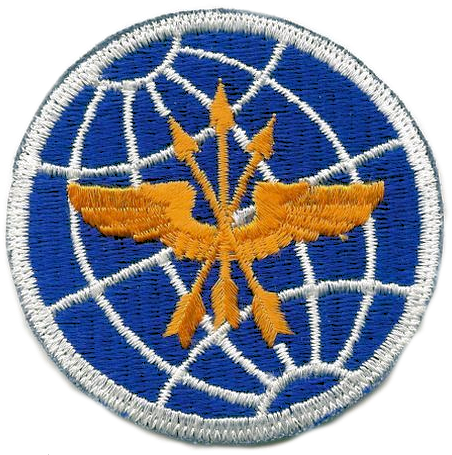
1608th Air Transport Wing

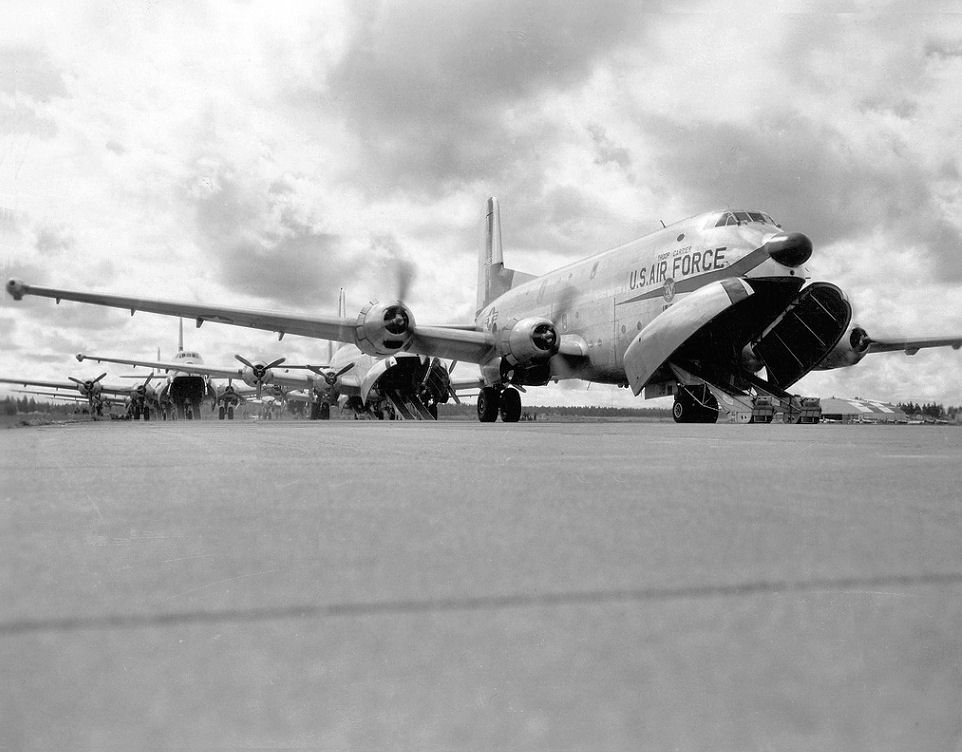
- C-124C Globemaster IIs loading cargo about 1960
- Active: 1955–1966
- Country: United States
- Branch: United States Air Force
- Role: Airlift
- Motto: Safety – Service
- Decorations: Air Force Outstanding Unit Award (Note: Award for wing elements participating in 1963 Deep Freeze Task Force.)

Insignia
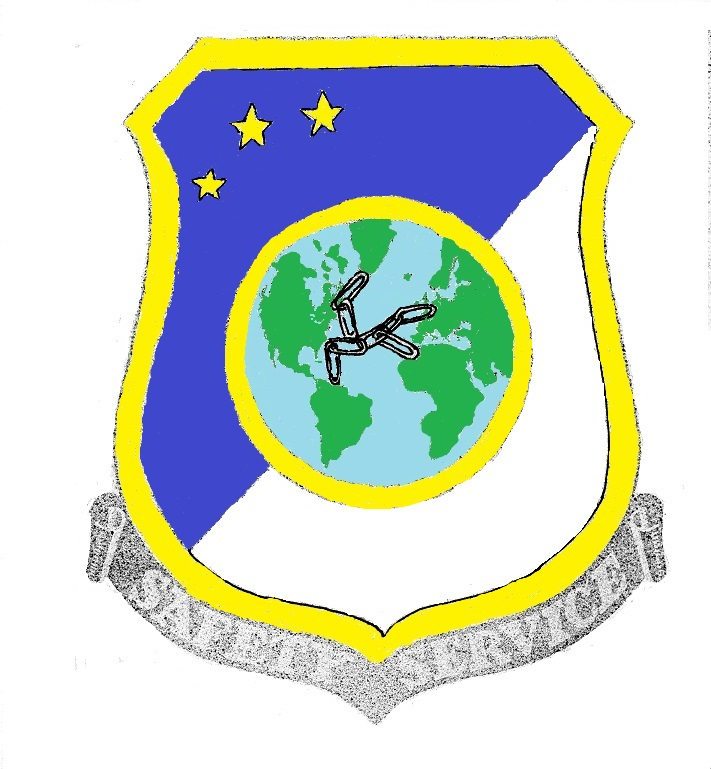
- 1608th Air Transport Wing emblem

The 1608th Air Transport Wing is a discontinued United States Air Force unit. It was last assigned to the Eastern Transport Air Force of Military Air Transport Service at Charleston Air Force Base, South Carolina. It performed strategic airlift missions until it was discontinued on 8 January 1966 and replaced by the 437th Military Airlift Wing of Military Airlift Command, which inherited its honors, but not its lineage or history.

== History ==
The wing was established in 1955 at Charleston Air Force Base, South Carolina When Military Air Transport Service expanded its operations there after assuming jurisdiction of the base from Tactical Air Command three months earlier.

The 1608th was initially established as a Douglas C-54 Skymaster medium transport unit, transporting cargo within the United States to other USAF stations. It was upgraded to heavy transport wing and re-equipped with long-range intercontinental Douglas C-124 Globemaster IIs for cargo transportation and Lockheed C-121 Constellations for passenger overseas transportation. The wing established an aerial port in 1956 for embarkation to and from the United States as well as large air terminal for transshipment of cargo. The 1608th received Lockheed C-130E Hercules transports in 1962 to replace its C-121s. It added jet Lockheed C-141 Starlifters in 1965 to replace the C-124s.

In 1963, the wing supported Operation Deep Freeze, earning an Air Force Outstanding Unit Award for all wing elements deployed to support the operation.

As the host for Charleston the wing supported Air Weather Service and Air Rescue Service squadrons and aircraft as well as Air Defense Command interceptor aircraft and other air defense units.

The wing was discontinued on 8 January 1966. Its equipment and personnel were reassigned to the 437th Military Airlift Wing the same date. Its history and honors (although not its lineage) were bestowed on the 437th to indicate that its replacement was only a conversion from a major command controlled (MAJCON) wing to an Air Force controlled (AFCON) wing. Its component units with the number 1608 were replaced by units with the new wing's number with the exception of the 1608th USAF Dispensary, which was reassigned to the 437th.

== Lineage ==
Designated as the 1608th Air Transport Wing, Medium
Organized on 1 March 1955
Redesignated 1608th Air Transport Wing, Heavy on 24 November 1957
Discontinued on 8 January 1966

=== Assignments ===
- Atlantic Division, Military Air Transport Service (later Eastern Transport Air Force), 1 March 1965 – 8 January 1966

=== Components ===
Groups

- 1608th Air Base Group, 1 July 1955 – 8 January 1966
- 1608th Air Transport Group, 1 March 1955 – 18 January 1963
- 1608th Maintenance Group, 1 July 1955 – 18 January 1963

Operational Squadrons

- 3d Air Transport Squadron, 18 January 1963 – 8 January 1966
- 17th Air Transport Squadron, 18 January 1963 – 8 January 1966
- 41st Air Transport Squadron, 18 January 1963 – 8 January 1966
- 76th Air Transport Squadron, 18 January 1963 – 8 January 1966

Support Squadrons

- 1608th Air Base Squadron, 1 March 1955 – 1 July 1955
- 1608th Air Terminal Squadron (later 1608th Aerial Port Squadron), 1 March 1955 – 31 March 1955, 1 January 1957 – 8 January 1966
- 1608th Communications and Electronics Maintenance Squadron, 18 January 1963 – 8 January 1966
- 1608th Field Maintenance Squadron, 18 January 1963 – 8 January 1966
- 1608th Organizational Maintenance Squadron, 18 January 1963 – 8 January 1966
- 1618th Organizational Maintenance Squadron, 18 January 1963 – 8 January 1966
- 1628th Organizational Maintenance Squadron, 1 July 1965 – 8 January 1966

Miscellaneous Units

- Aerial Port of Embarkation, Charleston Air Force Base, 3 January 1956 – 8 January 1966
- 1608th USAF Dispensary, 1 March 1955 – 8 January 1966

=== Stations ===
- Charleston Air Force Base, South Carolina, 1 March 1955 – 8 January 1966

=== Aircraft ===
- Douglas VC-47D Skytrain, 1954–1966
- Beechcraft C-45 Expeditor, 1954–1955
- Beechcraft T-34A Mentor, 1954
- Douglas C-54 Skymaster, 1954–1955
- Lockheed C-121C Constellation, 1955–1963
- Douglas C-124 Globemaster II, 1957–1965
- Lockheed C-130E Hercules, 1962–1966
- Lockheed C-141 Starlifter, 1965–1966
- Sikorsky H-19 Chickasaw, 1954–1960
- Kaman H-43 Huskie, 1960–1966
