= 41st Military Airlift Squadron =

- A 437th Military Airlift Wing C-141B Starlifter aircraft airdropping supplies to an outpost near the North Pole
- Active: 1942–1943; 1953–1991
- Country: United States
- Branch: United States Air Force
- Role: Airlift
- Motto: Toujours Pret (French for 'Always Ready')

Insignia
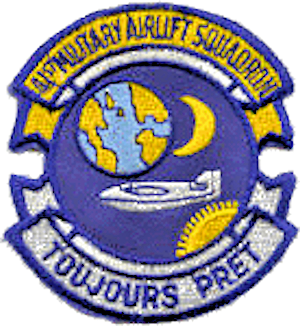
- Patch with 41st Military Airlift Squadron emblem

The 41st Military Airlift Squadron is an inactive United States Air Force unit. It was last assigned to the 437th Military Airlift Wing, Military Airlift Command, stationed at Charleston Air Force Base, South Carolina, where it was inactivated on 1 October 1991.

== History ==
The unit was activated as the 41st Ferrying Squadron (later 41st Transport Squadron) at Accra Airfield, British Gold Coast (Ghana), West Africa, in Aug 1942. It ferried various aircraft, including A-20s, A-30s, B-17s, B-24s, B-25s, B-26s, B-34s, P-38s, P-40s, C-46s, and C-53s, to destinations in England, North Africa, the Middle East, Iran and India. It also provided a maintenance service for transient aircraft until disbanded on 30 September 1943.

The squadron was reactivated in July 1952 at Wheelus Field, Libya. It flew Douglas C-54 Skymasters to Egypt, Saudi Arabia and Cyprus; it also operated the base transport control center. Nine months after activation, the 41st undertook transient maintenance. It ceased flying operations on 1 Apr 1954 to prepare to move to the United States. By 13 Apr, it had completed the move to Charleston Air Force Base, South Carolina and made its first scheduled flight on 10 May. Over the next fourteen months, its C-54s flew to Goose Bay Airport, Labrador; Torbay, Newfoundland; Port Lyautey, Morocco; Tripoli, Libya; England; West Germany; Thule, Greenland; Bermuda; the Azores and France.

The squadron converted to the Lockheed C-121C Constellation between 15 September and 31 December 1955, and added destinations in the Caribbean and Central America to its operations. In November–December, it flew the first of many missions in support of the UN, transporting peace-keeping forces from Columbia and India to Beirut, Lebanon, to enforce a Middle East cease-fire between Egypt and Israel. The airlift of Hungarian refugees from West Germany to the United States in Dec 1956 was only one of many humanitarian missions flown.

In 1962 the 41st transferred its C-121s to Air National Guard units and received its first Lockheed EC-130E Hercules on 11 August. During the 1960s, the squadron annually flew airlift missions to the Antarctic in support of U.S. scientific bases there. In the spring of 1965, it helped airlift troops, equipment and supplies to the Dominican Republic in support of the U.S.-backed government. In May 1965, it flew the first airlift mission to Vietnam. Redesignated 41st Airlift Squadron in January 1966, it converted to Lockheed C-141 Starlifter aircraft in February–May 1967, and expanded operations to destinations all over the world. Flights to Southeast Asia in support of combat operations became much more frequent, only ceasing with the withdrawal of the U.S. in January 1973. The squadron frequently flew support missions for presidential trips, including President Richard M. Nixon's visit to the People's Republic of China in February 1972.

The squadron participated in the airlift of military supplies to Israel during the Yom Kippur War in October–November 1973. It flew missions in support of the evacuation and resettlement of Southeast Asian refugees, as the Communists took over South Vietnam and Cambodia between April and June 1975. Between 23 and 29 Oct 1983, it airlifted replacement troops and equipment to Beirut after a terrorist attack on U.S. Marines' barracks killed 241 men. The 41st IBS provided airlift support for the Grenada operation from 24 Oct to 19 Dec 1983. In recent years, the squadron has participated regularly in tactical air-drop exercises with the Army, and provided support for the U.S. Navy as well.

It was inactivated in 1992 as part of the drawdown of the USAF after the end of the Cold War.

=== Lineage ===
- Constituted as the 41st Ferrying Squadron on 9 July 1942

Activated on 17 August 1942
Redesignated: 41st Transport Squadron on 24 March 1943
Disbanded on 30 September 1943
Reconstituted and redesignated 41st Air Transport Squadron, Medium on 20 June 1952
Activated on 20 July 1952
Redesignated 41st Air Transport Squadron, Heavy on 1 July 1955
Redesignated 41st Military Airlift Squadron on 8 January 1966
Inactivated on 1 April 1992

=== Assignments ===
- 12th Ferrying (later, 12th Transport) Group, 17 August 1942 – 30 September 1943
- 1603d Air Transport Wing, 20 July 1952
- 1602d Air Transport Wing, 1 January 1953
- 1608th Air Transport Group, 13 April 1954
- 1608th Air Transport Wing, Heavy, 18 January 1963
- 437th Military Airlift Wing, 8 January 1966
- 437th Operations Group, 1 October 1991 – 1 April 1992

=== Stations ===
- Accra Airfield, British Gold Coast, 17 August 1942 – 30 September 1943
- Wheelus Air Base, Libya, 20 July 1952
- Charleston Air Force Base, South Carolina, 13 April 1954 – 1 April 1992

=== Aircraft ===
- Douglas C-54 Skymaster, 1952–1955
- Lockheed C-121 Constellation, 1955–1962
- Lockheed C-130E Hercules, 1962–1967
- Lockheed C-141 Starlifter, 1967–1992
