= 83d Troop Carrier Squadron =

- Active: 1943-1957
- Country: United States
- Branch: United States Air Force

The 83d Troop Carrier Squadron is an inactive United States Air Force unit. Its last assignment was with the 437th Troop Carrier Group, based at O'Hare International Airport, Illinois. It was inactivated on 16 November 1957.

== History ==
Activated in May 1943 under I Troop Carrier Command and equipped with C-47 Skytrains. Trained in various parts of the eastern United States until the end of 1943. Deployed to England and assigned to IX Troop Carrier Command, Ninth Air Force.

Prepared for the invasion of Nazi-occupied Europe. During the Normandy campaign, the group released gliders over Cherbourg Naval Base and carried troops, weapons, ammunition, rations, and other supplies for the 82nd Airborne Division in Operation Neptune.

Deployed to Italy in July 1944 and participated in the Allied invasion of southern France in August 1944 dropping paratroops of the 1st Airborne Task Force.

During Operation Market Garden in September 1944, the group released gliders carrying troops and equipment for the airborne attack in the occupied Netherlands. In December 1944, the group re-supplied the 101st Airborne Division in the Bastogne area of Belgium during the Battle of the Bulge. After moving to France in February 1945, the unit released gliders in support of an American crossing of the Rhine River called Operation Varsity in March 1945.

Evacuated wounded personnel to rear-zone hospitals. After V-E Day, the group evacuated prisoners of war and displaced persons to relocation centers. Returned to the United States in August 1945, became a transport squadron for Continental Air Command until inactivation in November 1945.

Postwar the squadron was activated in the air force reserve in 1947 at Orchard Place Airport, Illinois, operating C-46 Commandos for Tactical Air Command Eighteenth Air Force. Inactivated at the start of the Korean War in 1950, its aircraft and personnel being used as fillers for active duty units, then inactivated.

Reactivated as part of Far East Air Force in 1951 in Japan. Equipped with C-119 Flying Boxcars and engaged in combat operations in the Korean Peninsula. Dropped 2nd Ranger Infantry Company (Airborne) troops near Munsan-Ni, inactivated in June 1952 as part of a reorganization of airborne troop carrier units in Japan

Returned to reserve status, reactivated at O'Hare International Airport, Illinois in June 1952. Inactivated in November 1957 as a result of the closure of O'Hare to military air traffic.

=== Operations and decorations ===
- Combat Operations. Airborne assaults on Normandy, southern France, the Netherlands, and Germany; relief of Bastogne; transportation of personnel and cargo in ETO and MTO during World War II, and between Japan and Korea during Korean War; airborne assault on Munsan-ni, Korea.
- Campaigns.

World War II: Rome-Arno; Normandy; Northern France; Rhineland; Ardennes-Alsace; Central Europe.
Korean War: First UN Counteroffensive; CCF Spring Offensive; UN Summer-Fall Offensive, Second Korean Winter, Korea Summer-Fall, 1952.

- Decorations: Distinguished Unit Citation: France, [6-7] Jun 1944. Republic of Korea Presidential Unit Citation: 1 Jul 1951-[10 Jun 1952].

=== Lineage ===
- Constituted 83d Troop Carrier Squadron on 15 Apr 1943

Activated on 1 May 1943
Inactivated on 15 Nov 1945

- Activated in the reserve on 3 Sep 1947

Re-designated 83d Troop Carrier Squadron (Medium) on 27 Jun 1949
Inactivated on 1 Aug 1950

- Activated on 26 Jan 1951

Inactivated on 10 Jun 1952.

- Activated in the reserve on 15 June 1952

Inactivated on 16 Nov 1957.

=== Assignments ===
- 437th Troop Carrier Group, 1 May 1943 – 15 Nov 1945
- Second Air Force, 3 Sep 1947
- Tenth Air Force, 1 Jul 1948
- 437th Troop Carrier Group, 27 Jun 1949 – 1 Aug 1950
- 437th Troop Carrier Group, 26 Jan 1951 – 10 Jun 1952
- 437th Troop Carrier Group, 15 Jun 1952 – 16 Nov 1957

=== Stations ===
- Baer Field, Indiana, 1 May 1943
- Sedalia Army Air Field, Missouri, 8 Jun 1943
- Pope Field, North Carolina, 9 Oct 1943
- Baer Field, Indiana, 31 Dec 1943-Jan 1944
- RAF Balderton (AAF-482), England, 20 Jan 1944
- RAF Ramsbury (AAF-469), England, 6 Feb 1944

Operated from Montalto Di Castro Airfield, Italy, 19 Jul-23 Aug 1944

- Coulommiers-Voisins Airfield (A-58), France, Feb-Jul 1945
- Baer Field, Indiana, 13 Aug 1945
- Marfa Army Airfield, Texas, 14 Sep-15 Nov 1945
- Orchard Place Airport, Illinois, 3 Sep 1947 – 1 Aug 1950
- Tachikawa AB, Japan, 26 Jan 1951
- Brady AB, Japan, Mar-10 Jun 1952
- O'Hare International Airport, Illinois, 15 Jun 1952 – 16 Nov 1957

=== Aircraft ===
- C-47 Skytrain, 1943–1945, 1947–1949
- C-46 Commando, 1949–1950, 1955–1957
- C-119 Flying Boxcar, 1951-1952
