= 437th Operations Group =

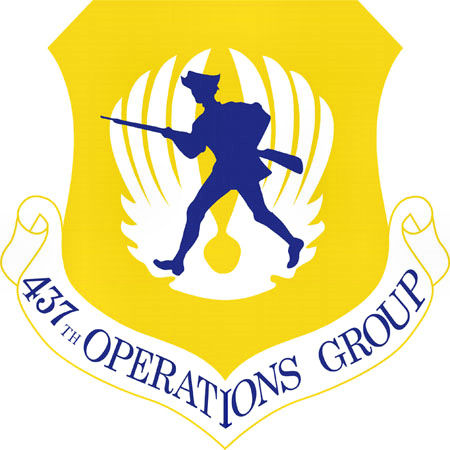
- Emblem of the 437th Operations Group
- Country: United States
- Branch: United States Air Force

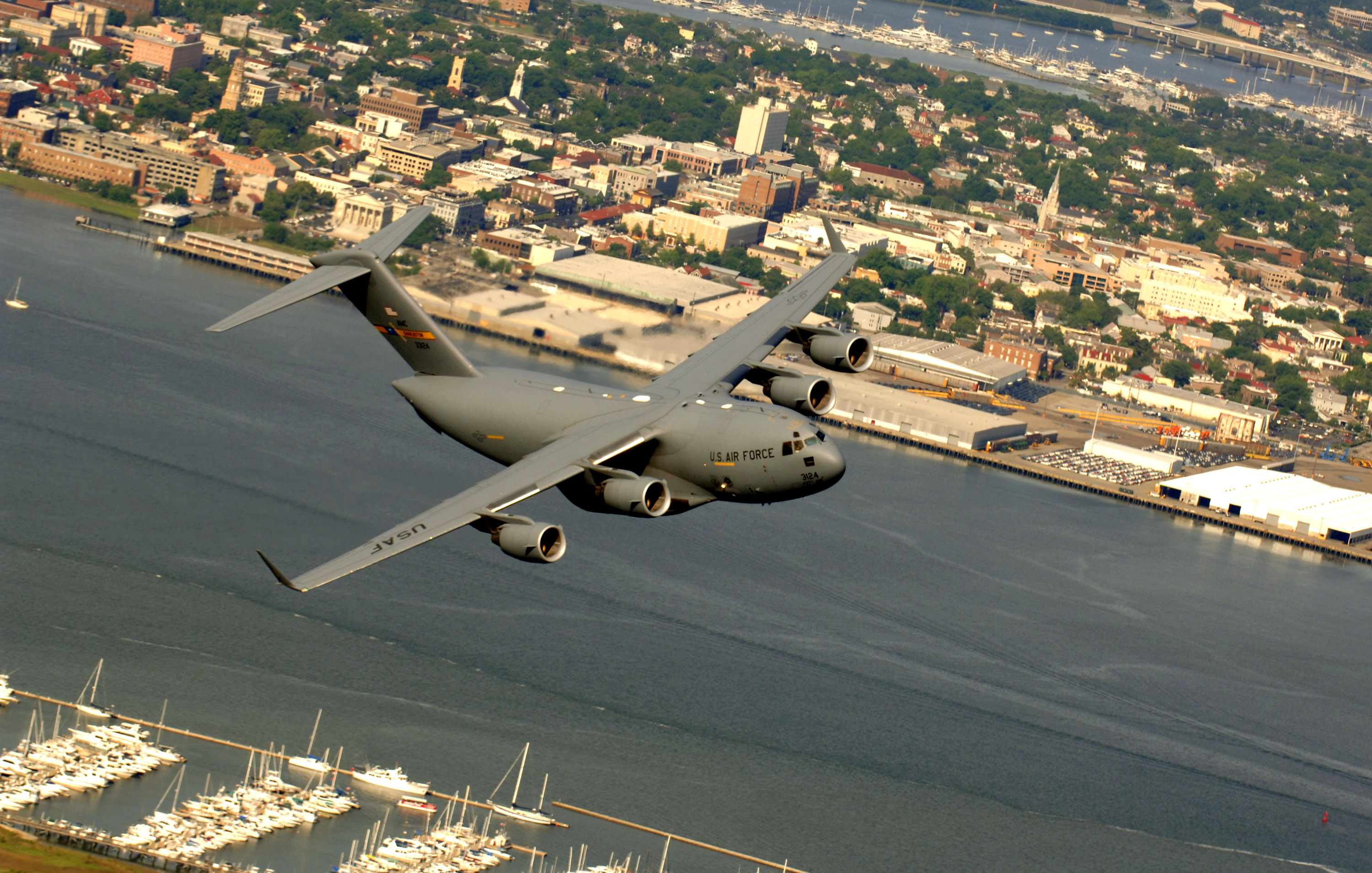
A C-17 Globemaster III from the 14th Airlift Squadron, Charleston Air Force Base, S.C., flies over downtown Charleston, S.C., during a training mission

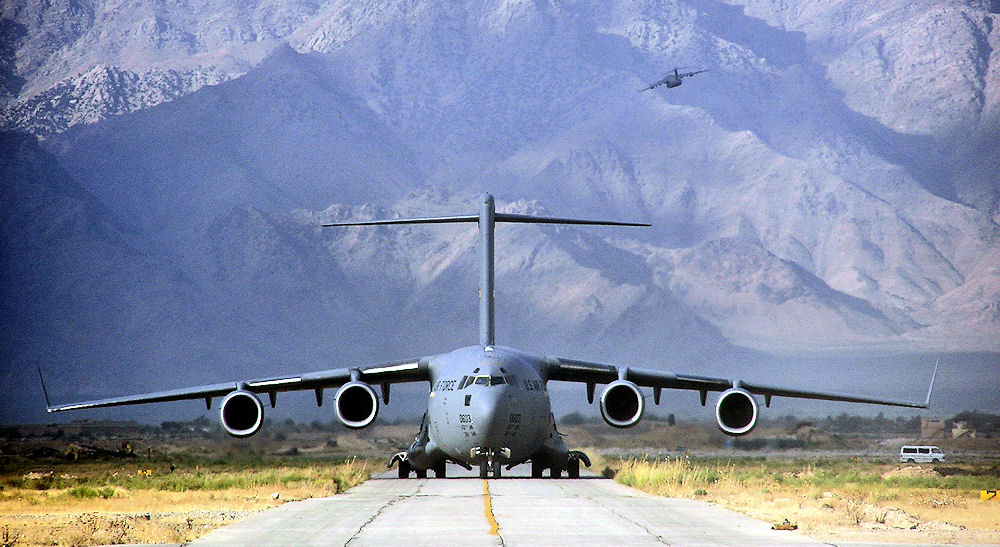
A C-17 Globemaster III from Charleston Air Force Base, S.C., moves up the taxiway as another begins its climb over the mountains surrounding Bagram Air Base, Afghanistan

The 437th Operations Group (437 OG) is an active United States Air Force unit. It is the flying component of the Eighteenth Air Force 437th Airlift Wing, stationed at Charleston Air Force Base, South Carolina.

The unit's World War II predecessor unit, the 437th Troop Carrier Group was a C-47 Skytrain transport unit assigned to Ninth Air Force in Western Europe. During the Normandy campaign, the group released gliders over Cherbourg and carried troops, weapons, ammunition, rations, and other supplies for the 82nd Airborne Division in Operation NEPTUNE. For these actions, the group received a Distinguished Unit Citation.

== Overview ==
The 437 OG is responsible for flying the C-17 Globemaster III jet cargo aircraft, the newest aircraft in the AMC airlift system.

== Units ==
The group consists of the following units:

- 14th Airlift Squadron
- 15th Airlift Squadron
- 16th Airlift Squadron
- 437th Operations Support Squadron

== History ==
For additional lineage and history, see 437th Airlift Wing

=== World War II ===
From May–December 1943, the 437th Troop Carrier Group trained with C-47 Skytrain cargo planes in Indiana, Missouri, and North Carolina. In January 1944, the group deployed to England, where it prepared for the invasion of Nazi-occupied Europe. During the Normandy campaign, the group released gliders over Cherbourg Naval Base and carried troops, weapons, ammunition, rations, and other supplies for the 82nd Airborne Division in Operation Neptune. For these actions, the group received a Distinguished Unit Citation.

The air echelon deployed to Italy in July 1944 and participated in the Allied invasion of southern France in August 1944 dropping paratroops of the 1st Airborne Task Force. During Operation Market Garden in September 1944, the group released gliders carrying troops and equipment for the airborne attack in the occupied Netherlands. In December 1944, the group re-supplied the 101st Airborne Division in the Bastogne area of Belgium during the Battle of the Bulge. After moving to France in February 1945, the unit released gliders in support of an American crossing of the Rhine River called Operation Varsity in March 1945. The 437th continued to supply the offensive forces in April, while also evacuating wounded personnel to rear-zone hospitals. After V-E Day, the group evacuated prisoners of war and displaced persons to relocation centers. The group then returned to the United States and was inactivated.

=== Cold War ===
Trained as a reserve unit until August 1950, when it was ordered to active duty because of the outbreak of war in Korea and later moved to Japan in November 1950. Between December 1950 and June 1952, the group airlifted ammunition, rations, aircraft parts, gasoline, and other war supplies from Japan to United Nations bases in Korea, while evacuating wounded troops from Korea to hospitals in Japan. During 1951, the 437th also dropped paratroops and flew re-supply and reinforcement missions in support of the Eighth Army in Korea. Between January–June 1952, the group transported battlefield replacements and evacuated troops on leave. From June 1952 – November 1957, the group again served as Reserve training organization flying C-46s.

=== Modern era ===
Activated as part of Objective Organization adoption by 437 AW in October 1991. Assumed control of operational squadrons. Routinely deployed aircraft and aircrews in support of humanitarian and contingency operations in the Balkans, Southwest Asia, Africa, Russia, and provided disaster relief support, 1992–2001. Supported Global War on Terrorism contingencies from October 2001–.

=== Lineage ===
- Established as 437 Troop Carrier Group on 15 April 1943

Activated on 1 May 1943
Inactivated on 15 November 1945

- Redesignated 437 Troop Carrier Group, Medium, on 10 May 1949

Activated in the Reserve on 27 June 1949
Ordered to active duty on 10 August 1950
Inactivated on 10 June 1952

- Activated in the Reserve on 15 June 1952

Inactivated on 16 November 1957
Redesignated: 437 Military Airlift Group on 31 July 1985 (Remained inactive)

- Redesignated: 437 Operations Group on 24 September 1991

Activated on 1 October 1991.

=== Assignments ===
- I Troop Carrier Command, 1 May 1943
- 50th Troop Carrier Wing, February 1944
- 53d Troop Carrier Wing, 17 February 1944
- 50th Troop Carrier Wing, 10 July 1945
- U.S. Forces European Theater, 18 July 1945
- I Troop Carrier Command, 6 August 1945
- IX Troop Carrier Command, 4–15 November 1945
- 437th Troop Carrier Wing, 27 June 1949 – 10 June 1952; 15 June 1952 – 16 November 1957
- 437th Airlift Wing, 1 October 1991–present

=== Stations ===
- Baer Field, Indiana, 1 May 1943
- Sedalia Army Air Field, Missouri, 8 June 1943
- Pope Field, North Carolina, 10 October 1943
- Baer Field, Indiana, 29 December 1943–c. 12 January 1944
- RAF Balderton (AAF-482), England, January 1944
- RAF Ramsbury (AAF-469), England, 5 February 1944

Air echelon deployed to: Montalto Di Castro Airfield, Italy, July–August 1944
Air echelon deployed to: RAF Chilbolton (AAF-404), England, 1–6 September 1944

- Coulommiers-Voisins Airfield (A-58), France, 24 February – 28 July 1945
- Baer Field, Indiana, 15 August 1945
- Marfa Army Airfield, Texas, 14 September – 15 November 1945
- Chicago-Orchard Airport (later, O'Hare Field-Chicago International Airport), Illinois, 27 June 1949
- Shaw AFB, South Carolina, 14 August – 16 October 1950
- Brady Air Base, Japan, 8 November 1950 – 10 June 1952
- O'Hare International Airport, Illinois, 15 June 1952 – 16 November 1957
- Charleston AFB, South Carolina, 1 October 1991–present

=== Components ===
- 14th Airlift Squadron: 1 April 1992–present
- 15th Airlift Squadron: 1 October 1993–present
- 16th Airlift Squadron: 1 October 1993 – 29 September 2000; 1 July 2002–present
- 17th Airlift Squadron: 1 October 1991 – 25 June 2015
- 20th Airlift Squadron: 1 October 1991 – 1 October 1993
- 36th Airlift Squadron: 1 December 1991 – 1 October 1993
- 76th Airlift Squadron: 1 October 1991 – 1 October 1993
- 41st Tactical Airlift Squadron: 1 October 1991 – 1 April 1992
- 83d Troop Carrier Squadron (T2): 1 May 1943 – 15 November 1945; 27 June 1949 – 10 June 1952; 15 June 1952 – 16 November 1957
- 84th Troop Carrier Squadron (Z8): 1 May 1943 – 15 November 1945; 27 June 1949 – 10 June 1952; 15 June 1952 – 16 November 1957
- 85th Troop Carrier Squadron (90): 1 May 1943 – 15 November 1945; 27 June 1949 – 10 June 1952; 15 June 1952 – 1 July 1957
- 86th Troop Carrier Squadron (5K): 1 May 1943 – 15 November 1945; 27 June 1949 – 1 August 1950; 26 January 1951 – 10 June 1952.

=== Aircraft ===
- C-47 Skytrain, 1943–1945
- C-53 Skytrooper, 1943–1945
- C-109 Liberator Express, 1945
- CG-4A Waco, 1943–1945
- Horsa glider, 1944
- C-46 Commando, 1949–1952; 1952–1957
- C-119 Flying Boxcar, 1951
- C-141 Starlifter, 1991–2000
- C-17 Globemaster III, 1993–present
