= 17th Airlift Squadron =

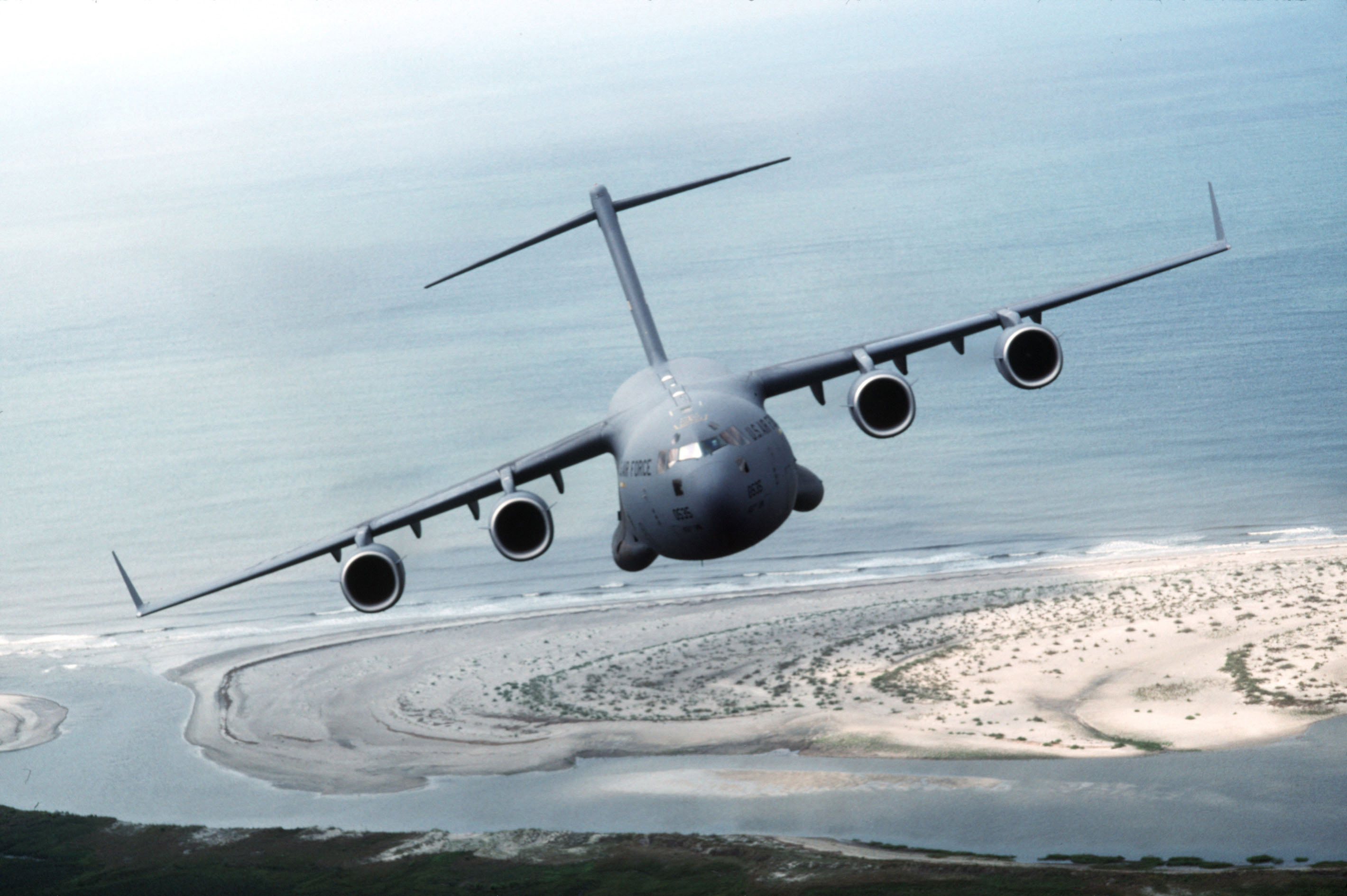
- 17th Squadron C-17 Globemaster III
- Active: 1942–1943; 1954–1969; 1987–2015
- Country: United States
- Branch: United States Air Force
- Role: Airlift
- Mottos: Anything, Anywhere, Anytime
- Engagements: Desert Storm
- Decorations: Air Force Outstanding Unit Award; Republic of Vietnam Gallantry Cross with Palm

Insignia
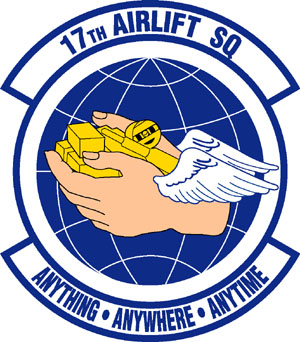
- 17th Airlift Squadron emblem (Note: Approved 27 October 1959.) (Note: Emblem description: On an Air Force Blue globe, grid lines White, issuing from the top of a white scroll, two hands flesh tone, winged at the wrists white, bearing supplies or cargo Air Force Golden Yellow; outlines and details Air Force Blue throughout.)

The 17th Airlift Squadron was most recently one of four active duty Boeing C-17A Globemaster III units at Charleston Air Force Base, South Carolina. The squadron was first activated during World War II as the 17th Air Corps Ferrying Squadron, redesignating as the 17th Transport Squadron a few months later. Until disbanding in 1943, it transported cargo and ferried aircraft in the Pacific.

The squadron was again activated in 1945 as the 17th Air Transport Squadron in 1954 at Charleston. When Military Air Transport Service became Military Airlift Command, the squadron became the 17th Military Airlift Squadron. (Note: The 17th Military Airlift Squadron should not be confused with the 17th Tactical Airlift Squadron, a different unit that had a similar name.) The 17th was inactivated in 1969 as the C-124 Globemaster II was retired from active service. The squadron reactivated as a strategic airlift unit in 1987.

== History ==
=== World War II ===
Constituted 17th Air Corps Ferrying Squadron on 18 February 1942. Activated on 27 April 1942 at Hamilton Field, California flying Curtiss C-46 Commando transporters. Redesignated 17th Transport Squadron on 19 March 1943. Disbanded on 31 October 1943.

=== Cold War strategic airlift ===
Reconstituted, and redesignated 17th Air Transport Squadron, Medium, on 22 March 1954. Activated on 18 Jul 1954 with Douglas C-54 Skymasters at Charleston Air Force Base, South Carolina. It performed worldwide airlift beginning 1954

Redesignated 17th Air Transport Squadron, Heavy, on 18 June 1958 with Douglas C-124 Globemaster IIs; 17th Military Airlift Squadron on 8 Jan 1966. Inactivated on 8 Apr 1969. It flew missions to Southeast Asia, 1964–1969.

=== Jet airlift ===
Activated on 1 Aug 1987.

Redesignated 17th Airlift Squadron on 1 Oct 1991, flying C-141s. It supported operations in Panama, 18–29 December 1989, and in Southwest Asia, August 1990 – December 1991 It supported operations in Afghanistan, September 2001 – June 2015 and in Iraq, 2003 – June 2015

It also supported humanitarian missions, including tsunami relief in India and Sri Lanka; Pakistan earthquake relief; Hurricane Katrina relief in the United States; and evacuated American Citizens from Lebanon

On 17 January 1995, the 17th Airlift Squadron was declared the first operationally ready C-17 squadron.

The 17th was the first unit to set up forward deployed C-17 operations, at the start of Operation Enduring Freedom.

The 17th Airlift Squadron recently stepped up to the plate once more and created another expeditionary squadron. For the first time, two C-17 squadrons deployed in forward theater locations, supporting Operation Iraqi Freedom, and Enduring Freedom. The 817th area of Responsibility split. On 1 June 2006, the 816th Expeditionary Airlift Squadron was created and launched its first crew 15 minutes later.

Unlike previous C-17 deployments, this one actually had the squadron itself doing all the flying from "an undisclosed location in Southwest Asia." The 17th helped initiate a whole new concept in C-17 operations in that this was the first time that the airframe was employed like traditional intratheater airlift assets such as the C-12, C-20, C-21 or the C-130. However, unlike traditional tactical airlift assets that are under the direct command of the theater commander, the 817th EAS is headquartered out of theater.

The ceremony marking the inactivation of the 17th Airlift Squadron was held on 25 June 2015 at Joint Base Charleston, South Carolina.

== Lineage ==
- Constituted as the 17th Air Corps Ferrying Squadron on 18 February 1942

Activated on 27 April 1942
Redesignated 17th Transport Squadron on 19 March 1943
Disbanded on 31 October 1943

- Reconstituted and redesignated 17th Air Transport Squadron, Medium on 22 March 1954

Activated on 18 July 1954
Redesignated 17th Air Transport Squadron, Heavy on 18 June 1958
Redesignated 17th Military Airlift Squadron on 8 January 1966
Inactivated on 8 April 1969

- Activated on 1 August 1987

Redesignated 17th Airlift Squadron on 1 October 1991
Inactivated c. 25 June 2015

=== Assignments ===
- Army Air Forces Ferrying Command (later Air Transport Command), 27 April 1942
- 11th Ferrying Group (later 11th Transport Group), 28 July 1942 – 31 October 1943
- 1608th Air Transport Group, 18 July 1954
- 1608th Air Transport Wing, 18 January 1963
- 437th Military Airlift Wing, 8 January 1966 – 8 April 1969
- 437th Military Airlift Wing, 1 August 1987
- 437th Operations Group, 1 October 1991 – c. 25 June 2015

=== Stations ===
- Hamilton Field, California, 27 April 1942 – 31 October 1943
- Charleston Air Force Base, South Carolina, 18 July 1954 – 8 April 1969
- Charleston Air Force Base, South Carolina, 1 August 1987 – c. 25 June 2015

=== Aircraft ===
- Curtiss C-46 Commando, 1942–1943
- Douglas C-47 Skytrain, 1942–1943
- Douglas C-54 Skymaster, 1954–1958
- Douglas C-124 Globemaster II, 1958–1969
- Lockheed C-141 Starlifter, 1987–1993
- Boeing C-17 Globemaster III, 1993–2015

=== Awards and campaigns ===
==== Decorations ====
Air Force Outstanding Unit Awards:

- 1 January 1963 – 1 February 1964
- 11 July 1966 – 10 July 1967
- 11 July 1967 – 10 July 1968
- 11 July 1968 – 8 April 1969
- 1 July 1988 – 30 June 1989
- 1 July 1989 – 30 June 1990
- 21 September 1989 – 31 October 1989

Republic of Vietnam Gallantry Cross with Palm: 1 April 1966 – 8 April 1969

==== Service Streamers ====
World War II American Theater

==== Campaign streamers ====
Southwest Asia: Defense of Saudi Arabia; Liberation and Defense of Kuwait

==== Armed Forces Expeditionary Streamers ====
Panama, 1989–1990
