= 304th Expeditionary Airlift Squadron =

304th Expeditionary Airlift Squadron

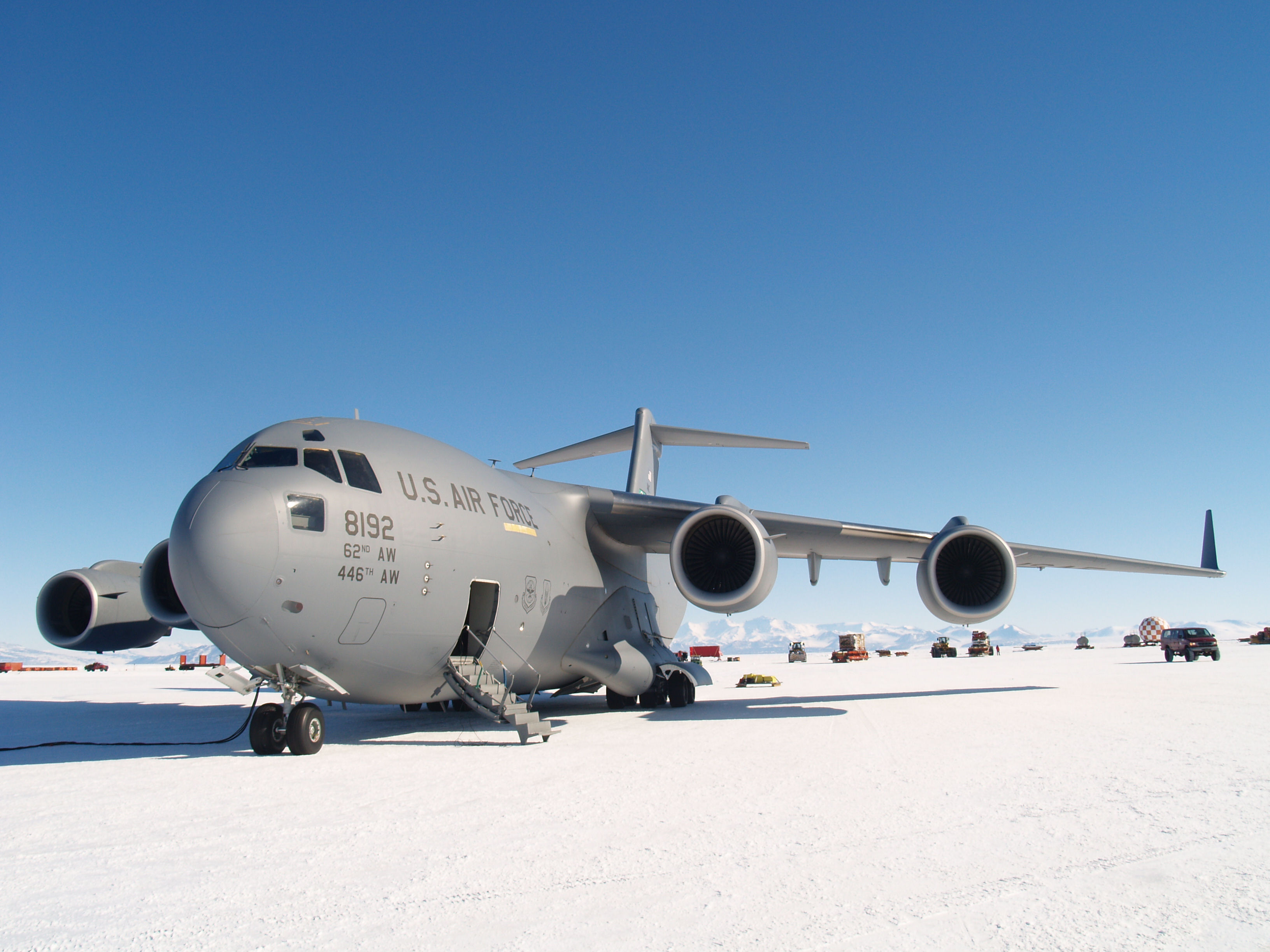
- Squadron C-17 Globemaster III on the ice runway at McMurdo Station, Antarctica, 21 November 2011.
- Active: 1943–1946; 1949–1951; 1952–1955; 1957–1974; 2003–2004; 2005–2006; 2007–present
- Country: United States
- Branch: United States Air Force
- Role: Airlift
- Part of: Air Mobility Command
- Engagements: Mediterranean Theater of Operations; European Theater of Operations
- Decorations: Distinguished Unit Citation Air Force Outstanding Unit Award Republic of Vietnam Gallantry Cross with Palm

Insignia
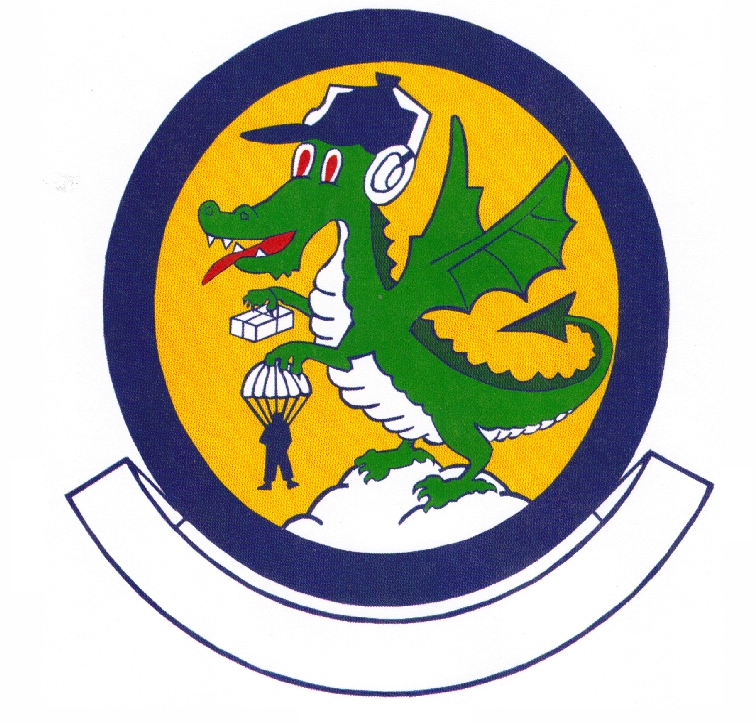
- 304th Expeditionary Airlift Squadron emblem (Note: Approved 6 August 1962.)

The 304th Expeditionary Airlift Squadron is a provisional United States Air Force unit. It is assigned to the 13th Air Expeditionary Group, based at Hickam Air Force Base, Hawaii.

== Mission ==
The 304th operates the Boeing C-17 Globemaster III airlifter in support of Joint Task Force-Support Forces Antarctica (JTF-SFA). The squadron provides the bulk of the air resupply between New Zealand and Antarctica. It also provides intercontinental transport of personnel and cargo to and from the United States.

The squadron consists of aircraft and personnel deployed to New Zealand from the 62d and 446th Airlift Wing at Joint Base Lewis-McChord, Washington.

== History ==
=== World War II ===
The squadron was first activated as the 304th Troop Carrier Squadron in September 1943 under I Troop Carrier Command and equipped with Douglas C-47 Skytrains. It trained in various parts of the eastern United States until early 1944. The squadron deployed to England and became part of IX Troop Carrier Command.

The unit prepared for the invasion of Nazi-occupied Europe. It began operations by dropping paratroops of the 101st Airborne Division in Normandy on D-Day on 6 June 1944 and releasing gliders with reinforcements on the following day. The unit received a Distinguished Unit Citation and a French citation for these missions. After the Normandy invasion the squadron ferried supplies in the United Kingdom.

After moving to France in September, during Operation Market Garden, the unit dropped paratroops of the 82nd Airborne Division near Nijmegen and towed gliders carrying reinforcements. In December, it participated in the Battle of the Bulge by releasing gliders with supplies for the 101st Airborne Division near Bastogne.

When the Allies made the air assault across the Rhine River in March 1945, each aircraft of the squadron towed two gliders with troops of the 17th Airborne Division and released them near Wesel. The squadron also hauled food, clothing, medicine, gasoline, ordnance equipment, and other supplies to the front lines and evacuated patients to rear zone hospitals. It converted from C-47s to Curtiss C-46 Commandos and used the new aircraft to transport displaced persons from Germany to France and Belgium after V-E Day. It was inactivated in Germany in September 1946.

=== Reserve and mobilization for the Korean War ===
Postwar the squadron was activated in the air force reserve in 1949 at Fairfax Field, Kansas, operating Curtiss C-46 Commandos. It was called to active duty and activated during the Korean War in 1951. Its aircraft and personnel were used as fillers for active duty units, and the squadron was inactivated.

=== Reactivation in the reserve ===
The unit reformed in the reserve in 1952, moving to Richards-Gebaur Air Force Base near Kansas City in 1955. Conducted routine reserve training operating Douglas C-124 Globemaster IIs flying worldwide transport missions beginning in 1961. The squadron was called to active duty due to the Berlin Crisis of 1961, but returned to reserve service in the late summer of 1962.

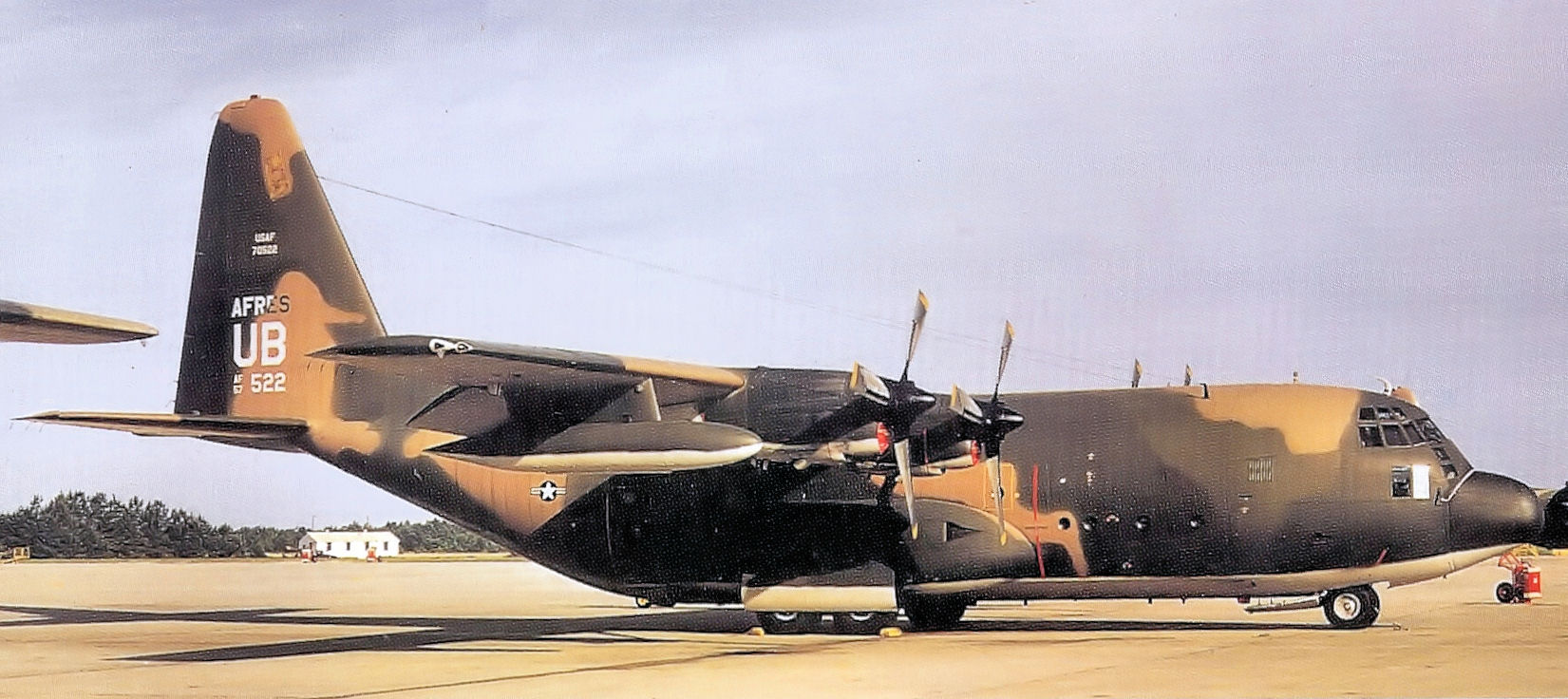
304th Tactical Airlift Squadron C-130 Hercules (Note: Aircraft is Lockheed C-130A-55-LM Hercules, serial 57-522 at Richards-Gebaur Air Force Base, Missouri in 1974.)

The squadron converted to the Lockheed C-130 Hercules aircraft on 27 October 1971. It routinely flew airlift support missions to the Pacific region and Southeast Asia from 1964 until 1972. It was inactivated on 30 June 1974 when personnel and equipment was merged into the 303d Tactical Airlift Squadron.

=== Awards and decorations ===
- Campaigns: World War II: Rome-Arno; Southern France; Normandy; Northern France; Rhineland; Central Europe.
- Decorations: Distinguished Unit Citation: France, [6-7] Jun 1944. Air Force Outstanding Unit Award: 1 Aug 1967-25 Oct 1968. Republic of Vietnam Gallantry Cross with Palm: 1 Apr 1966-19 May 1972.

== Lineage ==
- Constituted as the 304th Troop Carrier Squadron on 25 May 1943

Activated on 1 September 1943
Inactivated on 30 September 1946

- Redesignated 304th Troop Carrier Squadron, Medium' on 10 May 1949

Activated in the reserve on 27 June 1949
Ordered into active service on 10 March 1951
Inactivated on 12 March 1951

- Activated in the reserve on 15 June 1952

Inactivated on 26 July 1955

- Activated in the reserve on 16 November 1957

Redesignated 304th Troop Carrier Squadron, Heavy on 8 May 1961
Ordered into active service on 1 Oct 1961
Relieved from active duty on 27 August 1962
Redesignated 304th Air Transport Squadron, Heavy on 1 December 1965
Redesignated 304th Military Airlift Squadron on 1 January 1966
Inactivated on 30 June 1974

- Redesignated 304th Expeditionary Airlift Squadron and converted to provisional status on 27 March 2003

Activated on 15 August 2003
Inactivated on 1 March 2004
Activated on 15 August 2004
Inactivated on 28 February 2005
Activated 29 July 2005
Inactivated c. 28 February 2006
Activated 2007

=== Assignments ===
- 442d Troop Carrier Group, 1 September 1943 – 30 September 1946
- 442d Troop Carrier Group, 27 June 1949 – 12 March 1951
- 442d Troop Carrier Group, 15 June 1952 – 26 July 1955
- 442d Troop Carrier Group, 16 November 1957
- 442d Troop Carrier Wing, 14 April 1959
- 936th Troop Carrier Group (later 936th Air Transport Group, 936th Military Airlift Group, 936th Tactical Airlift Group), 17 January 1963 – 30 June 1974
- Air Mobility Command to activate or inactivate at any time after 27 Mar 2003

500th Air Expeditionary Group, 15 August 2003 – 1 March 2004
Attached to 715th Air Mobility Operations Group, 15 August 2004 – 28 February 2005
500th Air Expeditionary Group, 29 July 2005 – c. 28 February 2006
Attached to: 13th Air Expeditionary Group, 1 October 2007

=== Stations ===
- Sedalia Army Air Field, Missouri, 1 September 1943
- Alliance Army Air Field, Nebraska, 15 December 1943
- Pope Field, North Carolina, 26 January 1944
- Baer Field, Indiana, 2–8 March 1944
- RAF Fulbeck (AAF-488), England, 27 March 1944
- RAF Weston Zoyland (AAF-447), England, 12 June 1944 (operated from Follonica Airfield, Italy, 18 July – 24 August 1944)
- Saint-André-de-l'Eure Airport (B-24), France, 5 November 1944 (operated from Metz Airfield (Y-34), France, 21 April – 15 May and 26 May – 10 September 1945)
- AAF Station Munich (R-82), Germany, September 1945 – 30 September 1946
- Fairfax Field, Kansas, 27 June 1949
- Olathe Naval Air Station, Kansas, 27 May 1950 – 12 March 1951
- Olathe Naval Air Station, Kansas, 15 June 1952
- Grandview Air Force Base (later Richards-Gebaur Air Force Base), Missouri, 3 April 1955 – 30 June 1974
- Christchurch, New Zealand, 15 August 2003 – 1 March 2004
- Christchurch, New Zealand, 15 August 2004 – 28 February 2005
- Christchurch, New Zealand, 29 July 2005 – c. 28 February 2006
- Hickam Air Force Base, Hawaii, 1 October 2007 – present

=== Aircraft ===
- Douglas C-47 Skytrain, 1943-1946; 1949-1950
- Waco CG-4A Glider, 1944-1945
- C/TC-46 Commando, 1949, 1950-1951, 1952-1955
- Fairchild C-119 Flying Boxcar, 1957-1961
- Douglas C-124 Globemaster II, 1961-1971
- Lockheed C-130 Hercules, 1971-1974
- Boeing C-17 Globemaster III, when active since 2003
