= 305th Expeditionary Airlift Squadron =

305th Expeditionary Airlift Squadron
- Active: 1943–1946; 1949–1951; 1952–1955; 1957–1972; 2011–2012
- Country: United States
- Branch: United States Air Force
- Role: Airlift
- Part of: Air Mobility Command
- Nickname(s): Tornado Squadron
- Decorations: Distinguished Unit Citation; Air Force Outstanding Unit Award; Republic of Vietnam Gallantry Cross with Palm

Insignia
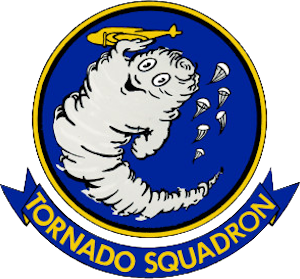
- 305th Expeditionary Airlift Squadron emblem (approved 29 September 1960)

The 305th Expeditionary Airlift Squadron is a provisional United States Air Force unit. It is assigned to Air Mobility Command, and operates from New Castle Air National Guard Base, Delaware.

== Mission ==
Attached to the 89th Airlift Wing at Joint Base Andrews, Maryland, the squadron operates from New Castle Air National Guard Base, Delaware with approximately eight aircrews, 60 maintenance personnel, and about a dozen operations personnel supporting five Lockheed C-130 Hercules aircraft. The squadron supports presidential airlift, through a mission known as "Banner Express". Aircraft and personnel are prepositioned to support an expected surge in airlift requirements.

The squadron was expected to commence operations in April 2012 and inactivate in late November.

== History ==
=== World War II ===
The squadron was first activated with Douglas C-47 Skytrains in September 1943 as the 305th Troop Carrier Squadron at Sedalia Army Air Field, Missouri and trained under I Troop Carrier Command. It trained in various parts of the eastern United States until early 1944. The unit then deployed to England, where it became part of IX Troop Carrier Command.

The squadron prepared for the invasion of Nazi-occupied Europe. It began operations by dropping paratroops of the 101st Airborne Division in Normandy on D-Day (6 June 1944) and releasing gliders with reinforcements on the following day. The unit received a Distinguished Unit Citation and a French citation for these missions. After the Normandy invasion the squadron ferried supplies in the United Kingdom.

After moving to France in September, the unit dropped paratroops of the 82nd Airborne Division near Nijmegen and towed gliders carrying reinforcements during Operation Market Garden, the airborne attack on the Netherlands. In December, it participated in the Battle of the Bulge by releasing gliders with supplies for the 101st Airborne Division near Bastogne.

When the Allies made the air assault across the Rhine River in March 1945, each aircraft towed two gliders with troops of the 17th Airborne Division and released them near Wesel. The squadron also hauled food, clothing, medicine, gasoline, ordnance equipment, and other supplies to the front lines and evacuated patients to rear zone hospitals. It converted from C-47s to Curtiss C-46 Commandos and used the new aircraft to transport displaced persons from Germany to France and Belgium after V-E Day. It was inactivated in Germany in September 1946.

=== Air Force reserve operations ===
Postwar, the squadron was activated in the Air Force reserve in 1949 at Fairfax Field, Kansas. At Fairfax, it again operated C-46 Commandos. The squadron was called to active duty during the Korean War in 1951, and its aircraft and personnel were used as fillers other units and the squadron was inactivated. The squadron was again activated in the reserve in 1952 at Olathe Naval Air Station. The unit moved to nearby Grandview Air Force Base in 1955, but was inactivated shortly thereafter. It was activated again at Tinker Air Force Base. Oklahoma in 1957 and conducted routine reserve training operating Douglas C-124 Globemaster IIs flying worldwide transport missions beginning in 1961. The squadron was again called to active duty in 1961 due to the Berlin Crisis of 1961. The 305th returned to reserve service in the late summer of 1962. It was inactivated with the retirement of the C-124 on 20 May 1972.

=== Operations and decorations ===
- Combat Operations. The unit participated in airborne assaults on Normandy during Operation Neptune in June 1944; in Southern France during Operation Dragoon; over the Netherlands during Operation Market in September 1944; and in Germany during Operation Varsity in March 1945. It was called to active service during the Berlin Crisis, from October 1961 until August 1962. The squadron routinely flew airlift support missions to the Pacific and Southeast Asia from 1964 to 1972.
- Campaigns. World War II: Rome-Arno; Southern France; Normandy; Northern France; Rhineland; Central Europe
- Decorations. Distinguished Unit Citation: France, [6–7] June 1944. Air Force Outstanding Unit Award: 1 August 1967 – 25 October 1968. Republic of Vietnam Gallantry Cross with Palm: 1 April 1966 – 19 May 1972

== Lineage ==
- Constituted as the 305th Troop Carrier Squadron on 25 May 1943

Activated on 1 September 1943
Inactivated on 30 September 1946

- Redesignated 305th Troop Carrier Squadron, Medium on 10 May 1949

Activated in the reserve on 27 June 1949
Ordered to active service on 10 March 1951
Inactivated on 12 March 1951

- Activated in the reserve on 15 June 1952

Inactivated on 26 July 1955

- Activated in the reserve on 16 November 1957

Redesignated 305th Troop Carrier Squadron, Heavy on 8 May 1961
Ordered to active service on 1 October 1961
Relieved from active duty on 27 August 196
Redesignated: 305th Air Transport Squadron, Heavy on 1 December 1965
Redesignated: 305th Military Airlift Squadron on 1 January 1966
Inactivated on 20 May 1972

- Redesignated 305th Expeditionary Airlift Squadron and converted to provisional status on 27 Mar 2003
- Activated on 1 December 2011

Inactivated c. November 2012

=== Assignments ===
- 442d Troop Carrier Group, 1 September 1943 – 30 September 1946
- 442d Troop Carrier Group, 27 June 1949 – 12 March 1951
- 442d Troop Carrier Group, 15 June 1952 – 26 July 1955
- 442d Troop Carrier Group, 16 November 1957
- 442d Troop Carrier Wing, 14 April 1959
- 937th Troop Carrier Group (later 937th Air Transport Group, 937th Military Airlift Group), 17 January 1963 – 20 May 1972
- Air Mobility Command to activate or inactivate at any time after 27 March 2003

Attached to 89th Airlift Wing, 1 December 2011 – November 2012

=== Stations ===
- Sedalia Army Air Field, Missouri, 1 September 1943
- Alliance Army Air Field, Nebraska, 15 December 1943
- Pope Field, North Carolina, 26 January 1944
- Baer Field, Indiana, 2 March 1944 – 8 March 1944
- RAF Fulbeck (AAF-488), England, 27 March 1944
- RAF Weston Zoyland (AAF-447), England, 12 June 1944

Operated from Follonica Airfield, Italy, 18 July – 24 August 1944

- Saint-André-de-l'Eure Airport (B-24), France, 5 November 1944

Operated from Metz Airfield (Y-34), France, 21 April – 15 May and 26 May – 10 September 1945

- AAF Station Munich, Germany, September 1945 – 30 September 1946
- Fairfax Field, Kansas, 27 Jun 1949
- Olathe Naval Air Station, Kansas, 27 May 1950 – 12 March 1951
- Olathe Naval Air Station, Kansas, 15 June 1952
- Grandview Air Force Base, Missouri, 3 April – 26 July 1955
- Tinker Air Force Base, Oklahoma, 16 November 1957 – 20 May 1972
- New Castle Air National Guard Base, Delaware, 1 December 2011 – c. November 2012

=== Aircraft ===
- Douglas C-47 Skytrain, 1943–1946; 1949–1950
- Waco CG-4A Glider, 1944–1945
- Curtiss C-46|C/TC-46 Commando, 1949, 1950–1951, 1952–1955
- Fairchild C-119 Flying Boxcar, 1957–1961
- Douglas C-124 Globemaster II, 1961–1972
- Lockheed C-130 Hercules, 2012
