= 442nd Operations Group =

442d Operations Group
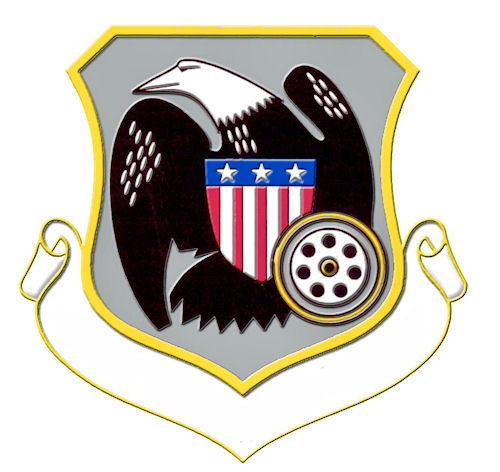
- Emblem of the 442d Operations Group
- Active: 1943–1946; 1949–1951; 1952–1959; 1982–1984; 1992–present
- Country: United States
- Branch: United States Air Force Reserve

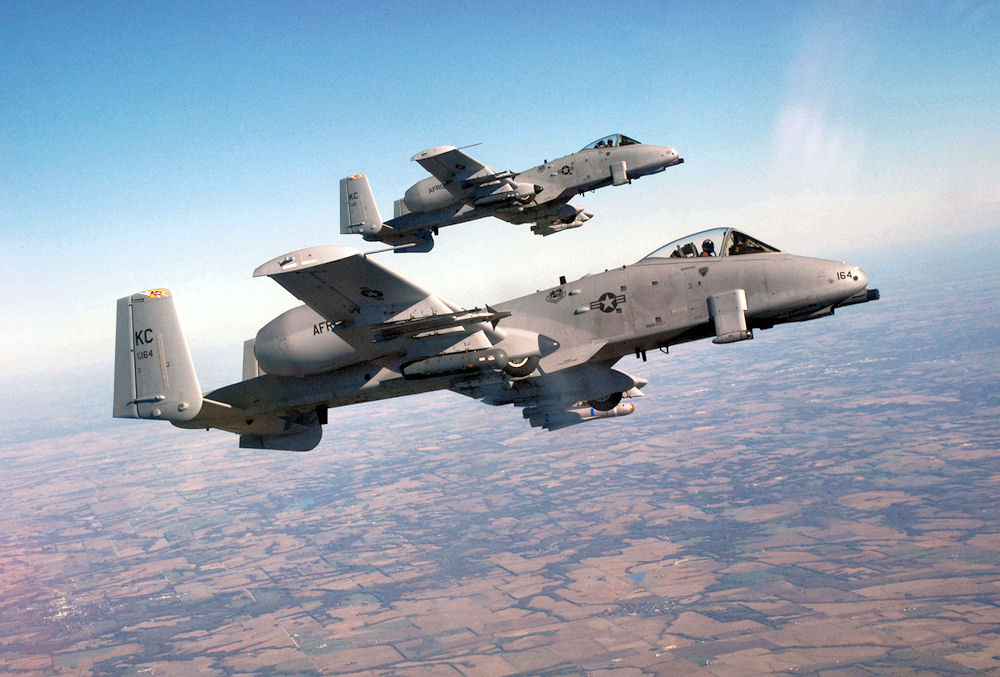
Two A-10 Thunderbolt IIs from the 442d Fighter Wing, fly formation

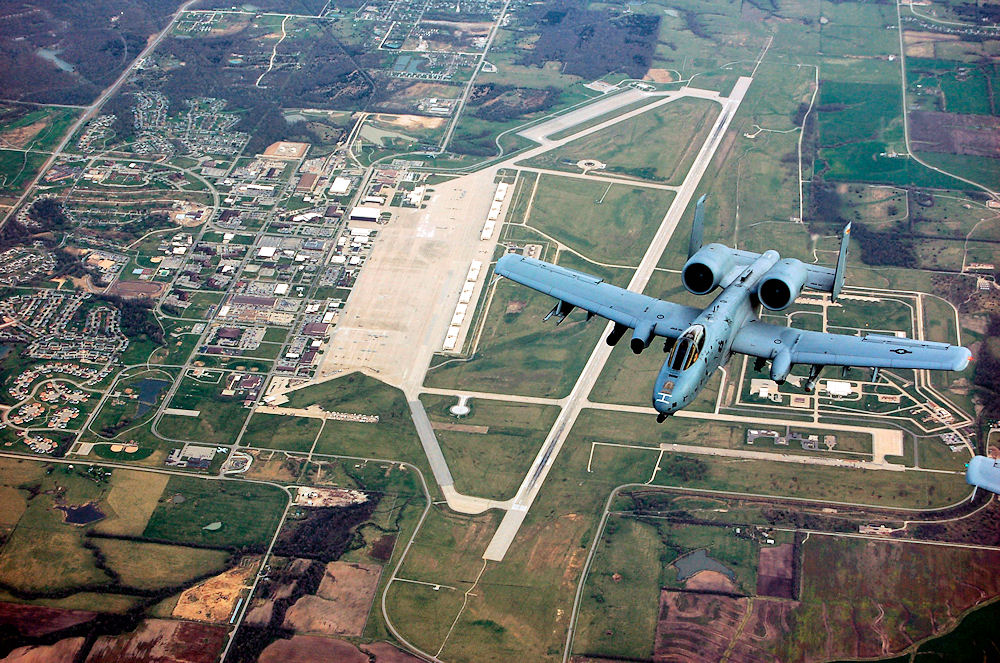
A 303rd Fighter Squadron A-10 over Whiteman Air Force Base

The 442d Operations Group is an active United States Air Force Reserve unit. It is the flying component of the Tenth Air Force 442d Fighter Wing, stationed at Whiteman Air Force Base, Missouri.

The unit's World War II predecessor unit, the 442d Troop Carrier Group was a C-47 Skytrain transport unit assigned to Ninth Air Forces in Western Europe. The 442d TCG group carried 82nd Airborne paratroopers into France for the 6 June 1944, D-Day invasion. In September 1944, the 442d flew units of the 101st Airborne into Belgium during Operation Market Garden. After D-Day, the 442d TCG flew resupply missions, hauled freight, and evacuated casualties in support of the Allied efforts in France and Belgium. While continuing its transport duties until V-E Day, it also released gliders filled with troops in the airborne assault across the Rhine River in March 1945, carried supplies to ground forces in Germany during April and May, and evacuated liberated prisoners of war.

== Units ==
The 442d Operations Group (Tail Code: KC), operates A-10 Thunderbolt II Aircraft.

- 303d Fighter Squadron
- 442d Operations Support Flight

== History ==
For additional lineage and history, see 442d Fighter Wing

=== World War II ===
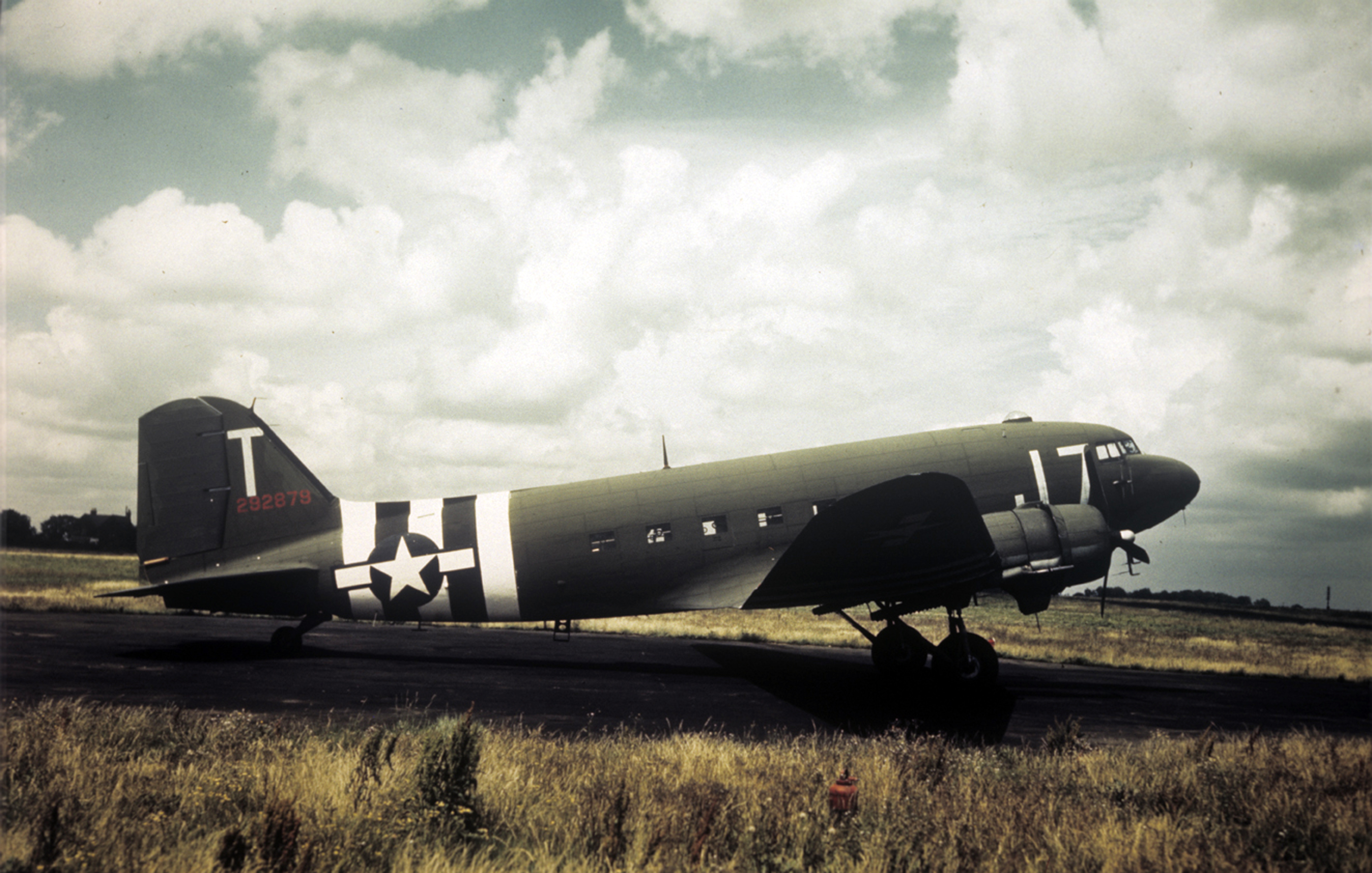
Douglas C-47A-15-DK Skytrain Serial 42-92879 of the 303rd TCS/442d TCG at Fullbeck in Normandy invasion markings.

The 442d trained in the United States with C-47 Skytrain and C-53 aircraft, then moved to England in March 1944 for duty with Ninth Air Force. The 442d was a group of Ninth Air Force's 50th Troop Carrier Wing, IX Troop Carrier Command.

The Douglas C-47/C-53 Skytrains of the group did not move in until 12/13 June although elements of the group had visited RAF Weston Zoyland during the preceding weeks. With 50 C-47s on the airfield, there was a shortage of aircraft standings and, while many aircraft were parked on the turf, additional PSP standings were put down in case of wet weather.

Haulage of freight to the Continent and casualty evacuation occupied the 442d until mid-July when the air echelons of three squadrons (303rd, 304th, 305th) were sent to Follonica airfield in Italy from where they look part in the air drops for the invasion of southern France in August.

In their absence, the 306th TCS continued with air haulage to and from France, being temporarily based at RAF Ramsbury for two weeks prior to the return of the MTO detachment on 24 August.

For Operation Market Garden, the 442d TCG air echelon moved to an advanced base at RAF Chilbolton to give better range and operated temporarily as part of 53rd TCW. The group suffered 13 crew casualties and lost 10 C-47s during the missions in support of the air operations over the Netherlands, all of which were flown from Chilbolton.

It was then back to supply carrying until the group was alerted that it would be going to its Advanced Landing Ground (ALG) Peray Airfield (ALG A-44) France. The main party moved out between 4/6 October, the 442d being the last of the 50th TCW groups to leave its English base.

In France, the group flew resupply missions, hauled freight, and evacuated casualties in support of the Allied effort to breach the Siegfried Line. While continuing its transport duties until V-E Day, it also released gliders filled with troops in the airborne assault across the Rhine River in March 1945, carried supplies to ground forces in Germany during April and May, and evacuated liberated prisoners of war.

The group flew air transport missions throughout Europe and the Middle East until inactivated in 1946.

=== Air Force Reserve ===
Trained in the Reserve as a troop carrier group, June 1949 – March 1951. Ordered to active service on 10 March 1951, the group inactivated two days later, its personnel being distributed to other USAF organizations. Served as a Reserve troop carrier group again from June 1952 to April 1959.

Activated as an A-10 fighter group in October 1982. Trained for such missions as close air support, anti-armor operations, battlefield interdiction, and combat search and rescue. On a recurring basis beginning in December 1993, deployed personnel and aircraft to Aviano AB, Italy, to participate in operations over Bosnia. Deployed aircraft and personnel to Kuwait in support of Operation Southern Watch, September–October 1998.

=== Lineage ===
- Established as 442d Troop Carrier Group on 25 May 1943

Activated on 1 September 1943
Inactivated on 30 September 1946

- Redesignated 442d Troop Carrier Group, Medium on 10 May 1949

Activated in the Reserve on 27 June 1949
Ordered to Active Service on 10 March 1951
Inactivated on 12 March 1951

- Activated in the Reserve on 15 June 1952

Inactivated on 14 April 1959
Redesignated 442d Tactical Fighter Group on 28 December 1981 (Remained inactive)

- Activated in the Reserve on 1 October 1982

Inactivated on 1 February 1984

- Redesignated 442d Operations Group, and activated in the Reserve, on 1 August 1992.

=== Assignments ===
- 61 Troop Carrier Wing, 1 September 1943
- I Troop Carrier Command, 17 December 1943
- 60 Troop Carrier Wing, 26 January 1944
- Ninth Air Force, c. 29 March 1944
- IX Troop Carrier Command, 31 March 1944
- 50th Troop Carrier Wing, April 1944

Attached to: 52 Troop Carrier Wing, 12 May – 6 June 1944 and 1–11 September 1944
Attached to: 53 Troop Carrier Wing, 11–26 September 1944

- IX Air Force Service Command, 20 May 1945

Attached to Supreme Headquarters, Allied Expeditionary Forces, 20 May – 10 August 1945

- 302 Transport Wing, 11 August 1945
- 51 Troop Carrier Wing (known in ETO as European Air Transport Service [Provisional]), 1 October 1945 – 30 September 1946
- 442d Troop Carrier Wing, 27 June 1949 – 12 March 1951; 15 June 1952 – 14 April 1959
- 434th Tactical Fighter Wing, 1 October 1982 – 1 February 1984
- 442d Fighter Wing, 1 August 1992–present

=== Stations ===
- Sedalia Army Air Field, Missouri, 1 September 1943
- Alliance Army Air Field, Nebraska, 16 December 1943
- Pope Field, North Carolina, 26 January 1944
- Baer Field, Indiana, 2–11 March 1944
- RAF Fulbeck (AAF-488), England, c. 29 March 1944
- RAF Weston Zoyland (AAF-447), England, 12 June 1944
- Peray Airfield (A-44), France, 5 October 1944
- Saint-André-de-l'Eure Airport (B-24), France, 7 November 1944
- AAF Station Munich-Riem, Germany, 4 October 1945 – 30 September 1946
- Fairfax Field, Kansas, 27 June 1949
- Naval Air Station Olathe, Kansas, 27 May 1950 – 12 March 1951; 15 June 1952
- Grandview (later, Richards-Gebaur) AFB, Missouri, 3 April 1955 – 14 April 1959
- Richards-Gebaur AFB, Missouri, 1 October 1982 – 1 February 1984; 1 August 1992
- Whiteman AFB, Missouri, 1 April 1994–present

=== Components ===
- 301st Troop Carrier Squadron: 10 May – 8 August 1945
- 303rd Troop Carrier (later, 303 Tactical Fighter; 303 Fighter) Squadron (J7): 1 September 1943 – 30 September 1946; 27 June 1949 – 12 March 1951; 15 June 1952 – 14 April 1959; 1 October 1982 – 1 February 1984; 1 August 1992–present
- 304th Troop Carrier Squadron (V4): 1 September 1943 – 30 September 1946; 27 June 1949 – 12 March 1951; 15 June 1952 – 14 April 1959
- 305th Troop Carrier Squadron (4J): 1 September 1943 – 30 September 1946; 27 June 1949 – 12 March 1951; 15 June 1952 – 26 June 1955; 16 November 1957 – 14 April 1959
- 306th Troop Carrier Squadron (7H): 1 September 1943-c. 5 January 1946; 27 June 1949 – 12 March 1951.

=== Aircraft ===
- C-47 Skytrain, 1943–1946; 1949–1950
- C-53 Skytrooper, 1943, 1944, 1945
- CG-4A Waco Glider, 1944–1945
- C-109 Liberator Express, 1945
- CG-15 Hadrian Glider, 1945
- C/TC-46 Commando 1949, 1950–1951
- C-46 Commando, 1952–1957
- C-119 Flying Boxcar, 1957–1959
- A-10 Thunderbolt II, 1982–1984; 1992–present
