= RAF Weston Zoyland =

Former Royal Air Force station in Somerset, England

RAF Westonzoyland USAAF Station AAF-447
- Bridgwater, Somerset, United Kingdom
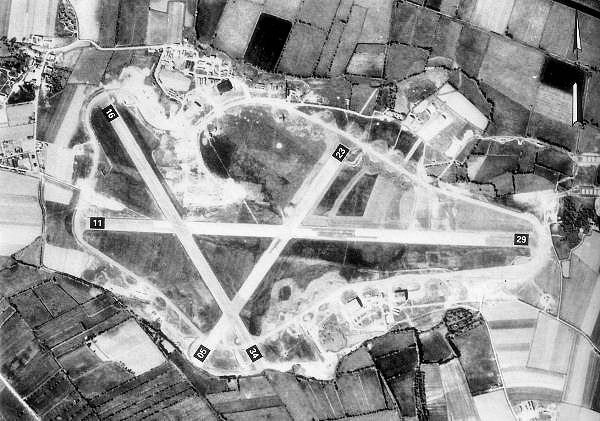
- Westonzoyland airfield, 22 April 1944. Devoid of aircraft prior to the 442nd Troop Carrier Group moving in during June.

Site information
- Type: Military airfield
- Code: ZW
- Owner: Air Ministry
- Operator: Royal Air Force; United States Army Air Forces
- Controlled by: RAF Transport Command; Ninth Air Force

Location
- Shown within Somerset RAF Weston Zoyland (the United Kingdom)
- Coordinates: 51°06′23″N 002°54′30″W

Site history
- Built: 1925
- In use: 1942-1956
- Battles/wars: European Theatre of World War II; Air Offensive, Europe July 1942 - May 1945

Garrison information
- Occupants: No. 525 Squadron; 442d Troop Carrier Group

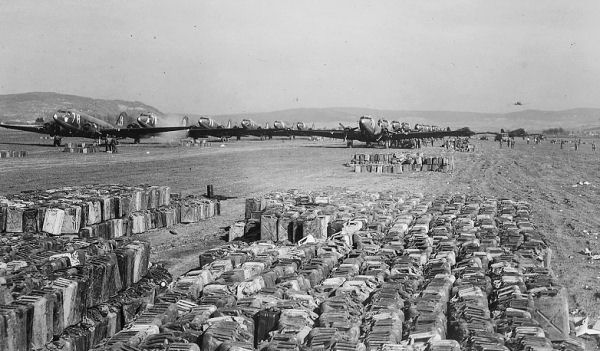
C-47s of the 306th Troop Carrier Squadron

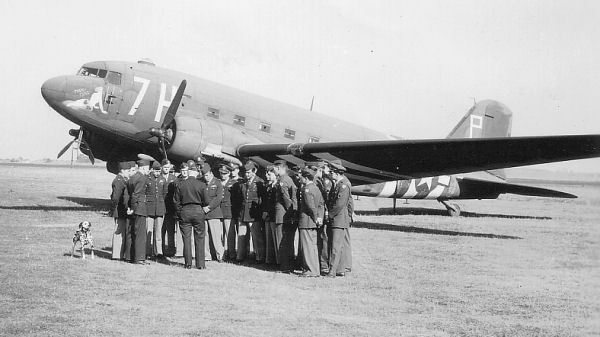
C-47s of the 306th Troop Carrier Squadron

Royal Air Force Westonzoyland, or more simply RAF Westonzoyland, is located approximately 4 miles (6.4 km) east-southeast of Bridgwater, Somerset, UK.

It was opened in 1925 with summer camps lasting from May until September each year. It was later used by the Royal Air Force (RAF) and United States Army Air Forces (USAAF). During the war it was used primarily as an army co-operation airfield but several squadrons were based there with a variety of aircraft, including Spitfires, Hurricanes and Mosquitos. Gloster Meteor jets were stationed there for a short time before moving to RAF Culmhead in Somerset. After being stood down in 1947 it was recommissioned in 1952 as a Meteor jet training station to support the demands of the Korean War. It was home to No. 209 Advanced Flying School RAF whose pupils included future Air Chief Marshals Lord Craig and Sir Patrick Hine.

Today the remains of the airfield are a mixture of farmland and a base for Civil Air Patrol activities.

== History ==
Westonzoyland airfield originated in the mid-1920s as a landing ground. It was used in 1926 by aircraft towing gunnery targets for the anti-aircraft training range off Watchet in the Bristol Channel. At first, it was no more than an extended cow pasture, subject only to seasonal use until the Second World War loomed, when the site was occupied on a permanent basis. During the pre-war years, buildings were erected piecemeal as required and the landing ground area gradually enlarged but, with the fall of France, Westonzoyland was no longer a backwater airfield.

To obtain the necessary amount of land for siting runways of sufficient length, the A372 to Othery was closed and diverted south on a former minor road.

In 1942, the Air Ministry decided to upgrade the airfield to bomber standard and, early in 1943, work began on laying concrete runways and a perimeter track to the Class A airfield standard, the main feature of which was a set of three concrete runways, at 60 degrees to each other in a triangular pattern.

The main runway was 5,775 ft long with headings 11/29, and the other two were 3,564 ft long at 05/23 and 4,101 ft long at 16/34. There were two 150 ft diameter hardstandings and 33 dispersal loops connected to the perimeter track which was the standard 50 feet width.

No. 13 Armament Practice Camp was here between 18 October and 20 November 1943.

=== USAAF use ===
Westonzoyland was known as USAAF Station AAF-447 for security reasons during the war while under American control, and by which it was referred to instead of location. Its Station-ID was "ZW".

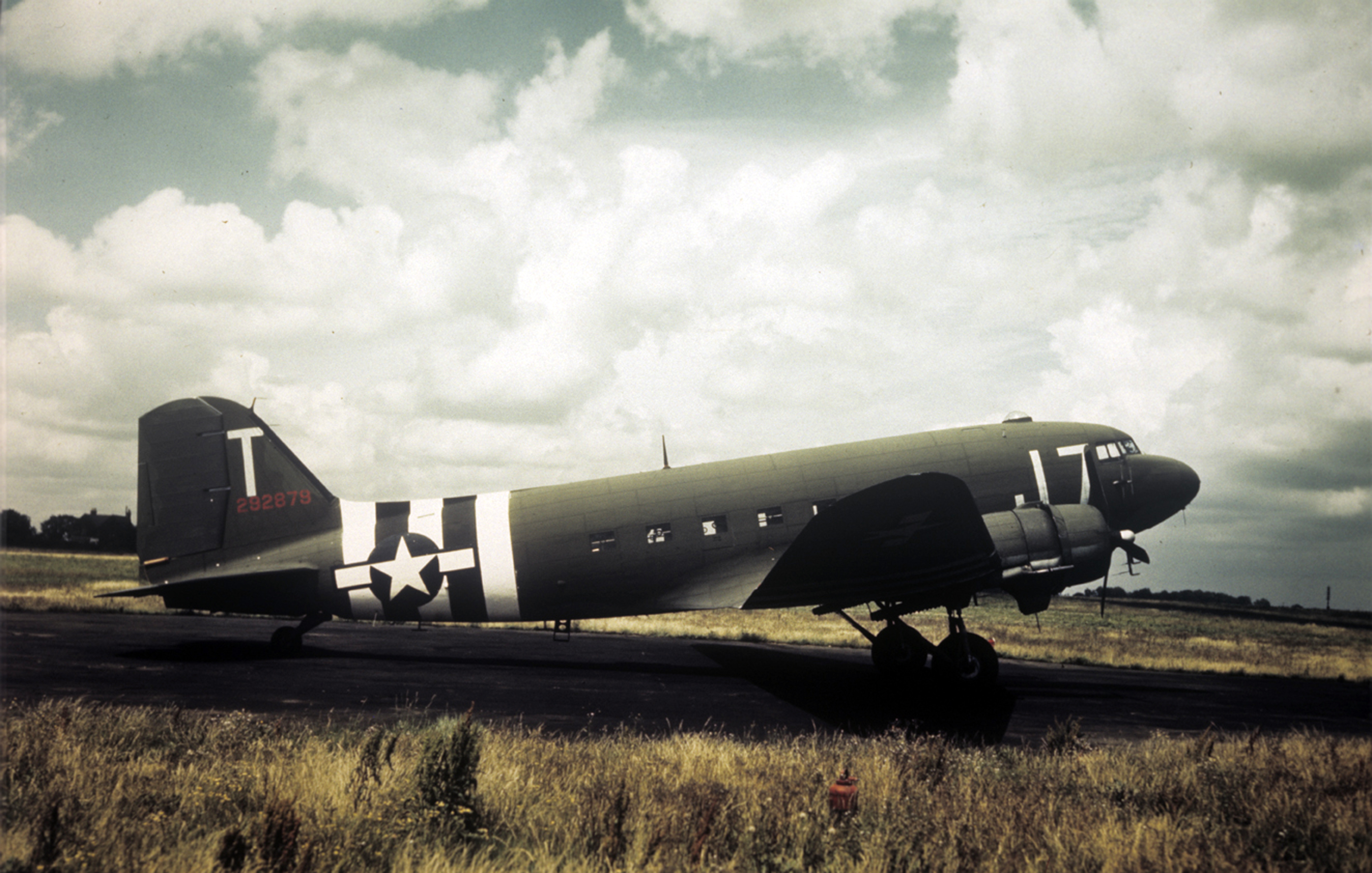
303rd TCS, 442d Troop Carrier Group Douglas C-47A Skytrain, seen at RAF Fulbeck 1944, shortly before moving to AAF-447 WestonZoyland

==== 442nd Troop Carrier Group ====
There was a long delay before the allocated unit, the 442d Troop Carrier Group arrived from RAF Fulbeck in early June 1944, just after taking part in the D-Day airlift. The 442d was a group of Ninth Air Force's 50th Troop Carrier Wing, IX Troop Carrier Command, flying Douglas C-47 Skytrains. Its operational squadrons were:

- 303rd Troop Carrier Squadron (J7)
- 304th Troop Carrier Squadron (V4)
- 305th Troop Carrier Squadron (4J)
- 306th Troop Carrier Squadron (7H)

In July and August 1944, the 303rd, 304th and 305th were temporarily relocated to Follonica Airfield, Italy. At the same time the 306th operated from Ramsgate, Kent. The whole group moved out completely in October 1944 to Advanced Landing Ground ALG A-44 Peray Airfield, France.

=== Subsequent RAF use ===
The station had never been officially transferred from the RAF and the anti-aircraft support units were quick to return. Several squadrons were based at Westonzoyland, but the longest stay was by No. 16 Squadron RAF with Westland Lysanders, and later with the North American Mustang. Later Supermarine Spitfires became a common sight being flown by No. 19 Squadron RAF and others. Nos. 286 and 587 Squadrons with their mixture of Miles Martinets, Hawker Hurricanes, Airspeed Oxfords, Vultee Vengeances and North American Harvards remained in residence until near the end of hostilities. 587 Squadron was formed at RAF Westonzoyland, on 1 December 1943, from 1600 Flight, 1601 Flight and 1625 Flight for anti-aircraft co-operation duties over Wales and the south east of England. It operated a variety of aircraft in this role. Due to the ongoing training requirement the squadron was not disbanded at the end of the war and it moved to RAF Tangmere on 1 June 1946 to cover the south coast, but was disbanded shortly afterwards on 15 June 1946.

Four fighter squadrons came and departed during the months following the end of the war in Europe, but by 1947 the station was reduced to care and maintenance.

There was virtually no further flying at Westonzoyland until the summer of 1952 when, to meet the Soviet threat, an increase in the RAF's strength and a demand for more aircrews found Meteors and Vampires operating in a training role.

English Electric Canberra squadrons were present during the mid-1950s when Westonzoyland was used as a work-up station prior to overseas assignments. By 1958 the station was once more deserted of aircraft and, although retained by the Air Ministry for another ten years, it never reopened for military flying. Some of the Canberras flew out to Australia to take part in the British atomic bomb tests at Maralinga.

== Current use ==
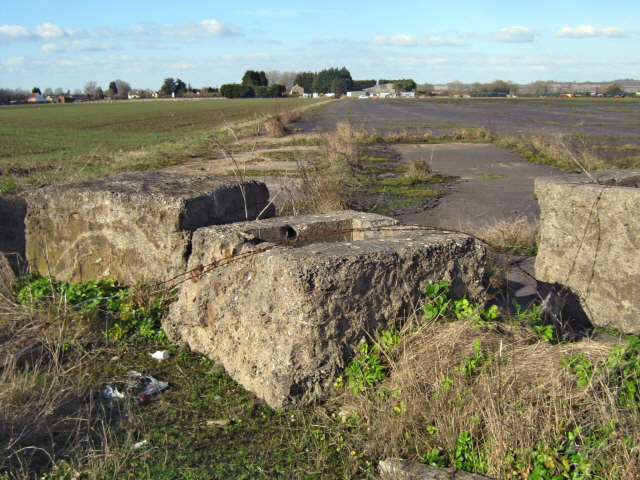
The airfield in 2010

Upon its release from military use, in the 1960s, the A372 was restored to near its original route by using a considerable length of the former main runway. The former secondary runways are clearly evident in aerial photography, although most of the concrete has been removed. The former perimeter track has been reduced to a single-lane agricultural road and the pan and loop dispersal hardstands have been removed. Several derelict buildings still remain, including the control tower and a large cluster to the northwest of the perimeter track, including the base of what appears to be the remains of two large J-Type hangars and a support site. No evidence of the pierced steel planking extensions to the runways remain nor of an ammunition dump.

In the late 1960s, local people used the station's squash courts.

Although much of the airfield is no longer usable for aviation purposes, Westonzoyland is in use for microlights which uses the northwest half of the 16/34 runway, and is a base for the Sky Watch Civil Air Patrol (SWCAP).

A second airstrip called Middlezoy Aerodrome started operating in 2018 on the south side of the former RAF Westonzoyland airfield. A hangar and an original Nissen hut have been erected.
