= 303rd Fighter Squadron =

US Air Force unit

303d Fighter Squadron

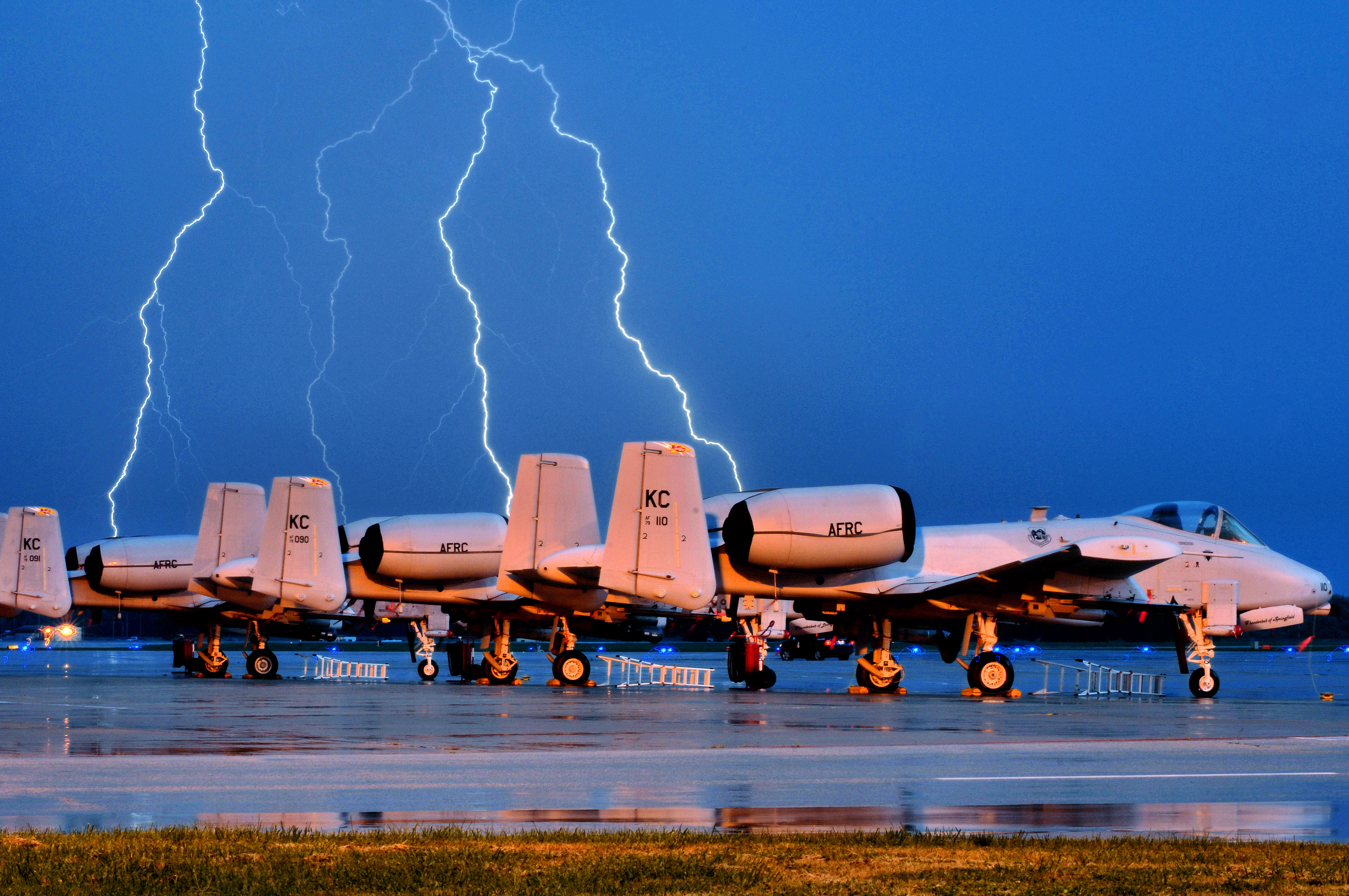
- 303d Fighter Squadron A-10 Thunderbolts
- Active: 1943–1946; 1949–1951; 1952–present
- Country: United States
- Branch: United States Air Force
- Role: Fighter
- Part of: Air Force Reserve Command
- Garrison/HQ: Whiteman Air Force Base
- Nickname: KC Hawgs
- Engagements: Mediterranean Theater of Operations; European Theater of Operations
- Decorations: Distinguished Unit Citation; Air Force Outstanding Unit Award; Republic of Vietnam Gallantry Cross with Palm

Insignia
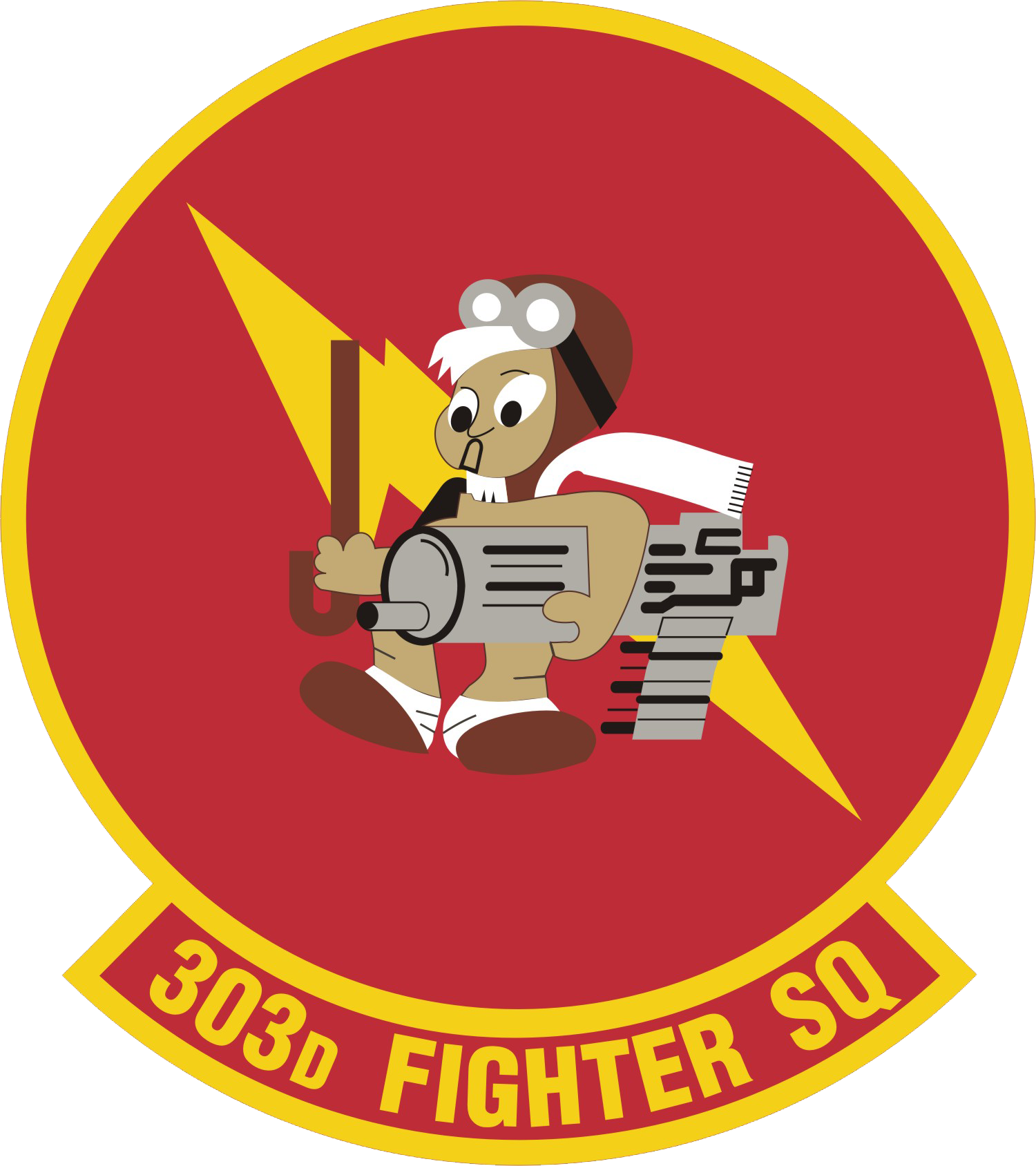
- 303d Fighter Squadron emblem (Note: Approved 13 April 1995.)

The 303rd Fighter Squadron is assigned to the 442d Operations Group at Whiteman Air Force Base, Missouri, and flies the Fairchild Republic A-10 Thunderbolt II aircraft conducting close air support missions.

The squadron was first activated during World War II. After training in the United States, it deployed to the European Theater of Operations, where it earned a Distinguished Unit Citation for its actions on D-Day. After V-E Day, the squadron remained in Germany until the fall of 1946 as part of the occupation forces.

The squadron was reactivated in the reserve in 1949. It was mobilized for the Korean War, but was inactivated and its personnel used as fillers for other units. When the reserve began flying operations again in 1952, it was once again activated. The 303d was mobilized again during the Berlin Crisis of 1961. It continued the airlift mission until 1984, when it converted to operating fighter aircraft.

== History ==
=== World War II ===
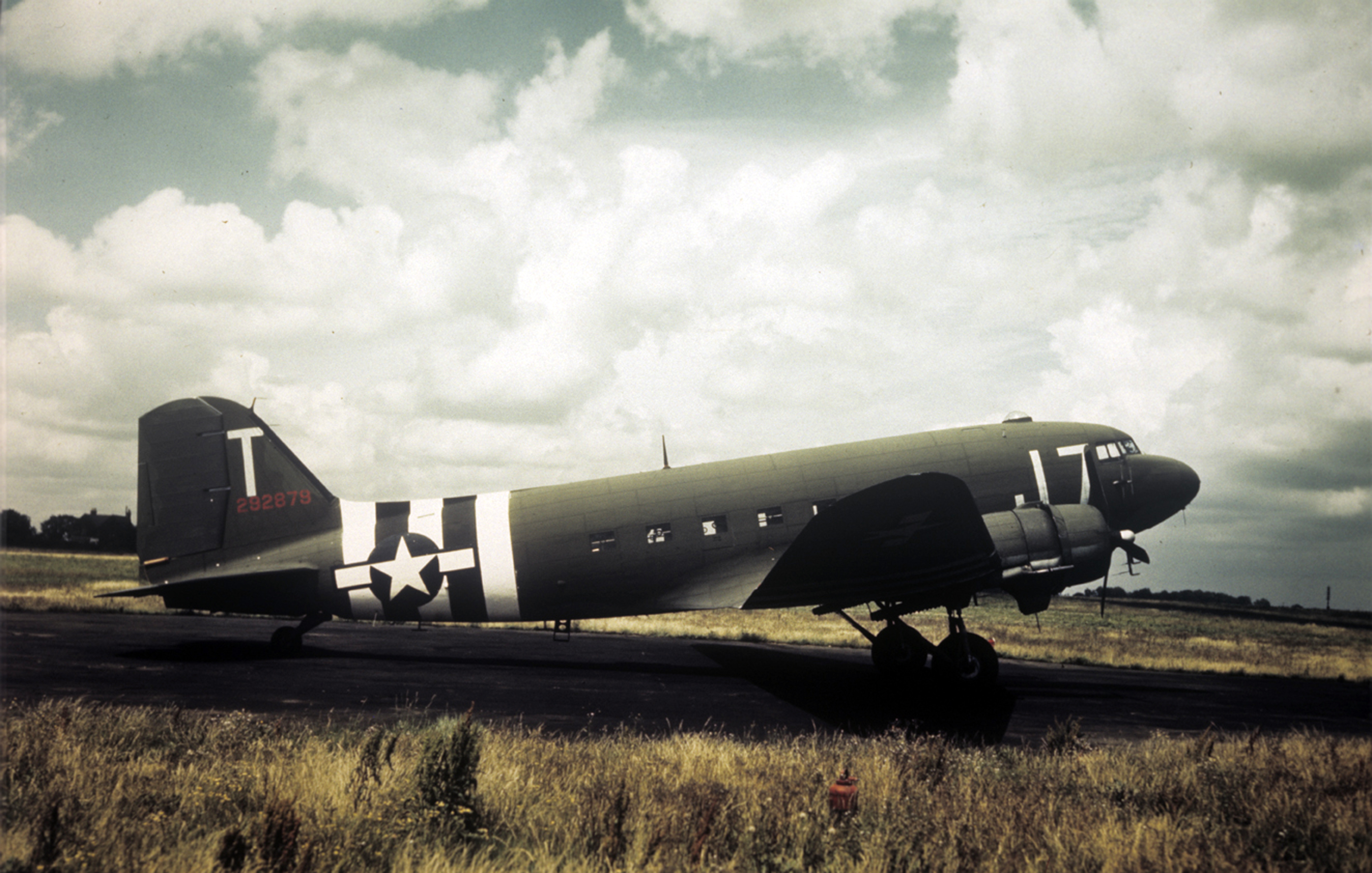
Squadron C-47A Skytrain at RAF Fullbeck in Normandy invasion markings (Note: Aircraft is Douglas C-47A-15-DK Skytrain, serial 42-92879.)

The squadron was constituted on 28 May 1943 and activated on 1 September, as the 303d Troop Carrier Squadron, one of four squadrons assigned to the 442d Troop Carrier Group at Sedalia Army Air Field, now Whiteman Air Force Base, Missouri. The 303d, with its parent unit, was created to provide airlift support of Allied forces in Europe during World War II using cargo aircraft and gliders. Following their stateside training, the squadron arrived at RAF Fulbeck, England on, 23 March 1944, where they made final preparations for the pending invasion of Europe.

On D-Day, 6 June 1944, the 303d participated in the airborne assault of the 82nd Airborne Division four hours in advance of the first seaborne landings at the Normandy beaches. The squadron went on to participate in other major operations in Italy, France, the Netherlands, and Germany throughout the remainder of the war in Europe.

Following V-E Day on 8 May 1945, the squadron remained in Europe as part of the occupation forces until it was inactivated in 1946.

=== Reserves and mobilization for the Korean War ===
In 1949 the 303d was reactivated at Fairfax Field, Kansas, with its parent unit, the 442nd Troop Carrier Wing, and assigned to the Air Force reserve.

=== Return to reserve duty ===
Following another active duty tour during the Korean War, the 442nd, with the 303d, eventually relocated to Grandview Air Force Base, Missouri. The airport was renamed Richards-Gebaur Air Force Base in 1957 for Lieutenant John Francisco Richards II and Lieutenant Colonel Arthur William Gebaur Jr., two Kansas City fliers who died in military combat.

The squadron was recalled to active duty for the Berlin Crisis in 1961 and, from 1966 through 1971, provided support for ongoing activities in Southeast Asia.

The mission of the 303d changed to fighter aircraft in 1982 when the unit received the Fairchild Republic A-10 Thunderbolt II and the unit was redesignated the 303d Fighter Squadron.

In 1991 the Base Realignment and Closure Commission recommended the closure and inactivation of Richards-Gebaur. It was later announced that the 442d, with the 303d, would relocate to Whiteman Air Force Base, Missouri and, on schedule, in June 1994 the unit completed its move to Whiteman.

After its return to its original home at Whiteman, the squadron deployed to Italy to support the No-fly zone over Bosnia and Herzegovina four times for Operations Deny Flight and Decisive Edge. In 1998, the squadron deployed to the Persian Gulf area for 45 days to support Operation Southern Watch, the United Nations' effort to deny Iraqi military access to southern Iraq.

In 2000, the squadron's responsibility shifted from Operation Southern Watch to flying Combat Search and Rescue missions for Operation Northern Watch from Incirlik Air Base, Turkey.

303d operations and maintenance members, along with two A-10 Thunderbolt II aircraft deployed to Afghanistan from April to July 2002 in support of Operation Enduring Freedom. In March 2003, squadron members and aircraft were deployed in of Operation Iraqi Freedom. The squadron made Air Force history when it became the first Air Force fighter squadron to forward deploy into Iraq, soon after arriving in the area of responsibility, and based at Tallil Air Base. The squadron made Air Force history again when it became the first Air Force fighter squadron to forward deploy a second time into Iraq, this time to base at Kirkuk Air Base. The 303d returned home from Iraq in November 2003 following an eight-month deployment with no aircraft damage and no combat injuries.

In 2006 the 303d won the A-10 gunnery competition Hawgsmoke.

Fox News reported that on 19 January 2018, 12 A-10s from the Squadron were deployed to Kandahar Airfield, Afghanistan, to provide close-air support, marking the first time in more than three years A-10s had been deployed to Afghanistan.

In April 2023, a group of A-10s were deployed to Thessaloniki Airport, Greece for the DEFENDER 23 exercise to train alongside the 113th Fighter Squadron of the Hellenic Air Force

=== Programmed change to mission aircraft ===
On 29 July 2026 Representative Mark Alford, whose district includes Whiteman, announced that Air Force Reserve Command (AFRC) selected Whiteman as its “sole candidate location” to host two dozen Boeing F-15E Strike Eagles. AFRC must still conduct an environmental impact assessment and make a final decision, a process expected to be completed by 2029. Initial Operational Capability with the Strike Eagle is expected in 2032.

== Lineage ==
- Constituted as the 303d Troop Carrier Squadron on 25 May 1943

Activated on 1 September 1943
Inactivated on 30 September 1946

- Redesignated 303d Troop Carrier Squadron, Medium' on 10 May 1949

Activated in the reserve on 27 June 1949
Ordered to active service on 10 March 1951
Inactivated on 12 March 1951

- Activated in the reserve on 15 June 1952

Redesignated 303d Troop Carrier Squadron, Heavy on 8 May 1961
Ordered to active service on 1 October 1961
Relieved from active duty on 27 August 1962
Redesignated 303d Air Transport Squadron, Heavy on 1 December 1965
Redesignated 303d Military Airlift Squadron on 1 January 1966
Redesignated 303d Tactical Airlift Squadron on 27 June 1971
Redesignated 303d Tactical Fighter Squadron on 1 October 1982
Redesignated 303d Fighter Squadron on 1 February 1992

=== Assignments ===
- 442d Troop Carrier Group, 1 September 1943 – 30 September 1946
- 442d Troop Carrier Group, 27 June 1949 – 12 March 1951
- 442d Troop Carrier Group, 15 June 1952
- 442d Troop Carrier Wing, 14 April 1959
- 935th Tactical Airlift Group (later 935th Air Transport Group, 935th Military Airlift Group, 935th Tactical Airlift Group), 17 January 1963
- 442d Tactical Airlift Wing, 1 November 1974
- 442d Tactical Fighter Group, 1 October 1982
- 442d Tactical Fighter Wing (later 442d Fighter Wing), 1 February 1984
- 442d Operations Group, 1 August 1992 – present

=== Stations ===
- Sedalia Army Air Field, Missouri, 1 September 1943
- Alliance Army Air Field, Nebraska, 15 December 1943
- Pope Field, North Carolina, 26 January 1944
- Baer Field, Indiana, 2–8 March 1944
- RAF Fulbeck (AAF-488), England, 27 March 1944
- RAF Weston Zoyland (AAF-447), England, 12 June 1944 (operated from Follonica Airfield, Italy, 18 July–24 August 1944)
- Peray Airfield (A-44), France, 5 October 1944
- Saint-André-de-l'Eure Airport (B-24), France, 5 November 1944 (operated from Metz Airfield (Y-34), France, 21 April– 15 May and 26 May–10 Sep 1945)
- Munich-Riem Airport (R-82) (later AAF Station Munich/Riem; AAF Station Munich; Munich Army Air Base), Germany, 10 September 1945 – 30 September 1946
- Fairfax Field, Kansas, 27 June 1949
- Olathe Naval Air Station, Kansas, 27 May 1950 – 12 March 1951
- Olathe Naval Air Station, Kansas, 15 June 1952
- Grandview Air Force Base (later Richards-Gebaur Air Force Base), Missouri, 3 April 1955
- Whiteman Air Force Base, Missouri, 1 April 1994 – present

=== Aircraft ===
- Douglas C-47 Skytrain (1943–1946, 1949–1950)
- Douglas C-53 Skytrooper (1943–1945)
- Waco CG-4 (1944–1945)
- Consolidated C-109 Liberator Express (1945)
- Piper L-4 Grasshopper (1945)
- Aeronca L-3 Grasshopper (1945)
- Waco CG-15 (1945)
- North American T-6 Texan (1949–1950)
- Beechcraft T-7 Navigator (1949–1951)
- Beechcraft T-11 Kansan (1949–1951)
- Curtiss C-46 Commando (1949–1957)
- Fairchild C-119 Flying Boxcar (1957–1961)
- Douglas C-124 Globemaster II (1961–1971)
- Lockheed C-130 Hercules (1971–1982)
- Fairchild A-10 Thunderbolt II (1982–present)
