= George Allison Whiteman =

American aviator (1919–1941)

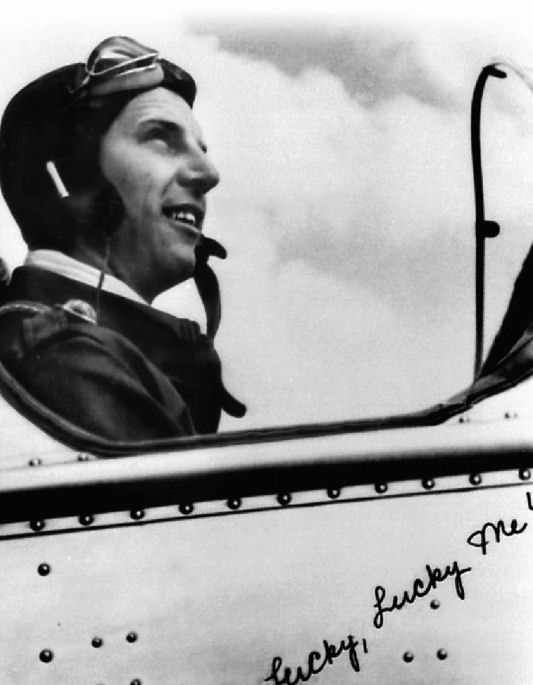
- Born: October 12, 1919; Pettis County, Missouri, U.S.
- Died: December 7, 1941 (aged 22) †; Waimānalo, Hawaii, U.S.
- Burial place: Memorial Park Cemetery; Pettis County, Missouri, U.S.
- Military career
- Allegiance: United States of America
- Branch: United States Army Air Corps
- Service years: 1940–1941
- Rank: Second lieutenant
- Units: 44th Pursuit Squadron, 18th Pursuit Group
- Conflicts: World War II; Attack on Pearl Harbor †
- Awards: Silver Star; Purple Heart

2nd Lt. George Allison Whiteman (October 12, 1919 – December 7, 1941) was an American military aviator, and was one of the 2,403 victims killed during the surprise attack on Pearl Harbor by Imperial Japanese Navy forces.

Whiteman Air Force Base is named for him.

== Biography ==
Whiteman, the eldest of 10 children of John and Earlie Whiteman, was born in Pettis County, Missouri, at the Wilkerson farm near Longwood. He graduated from Smith-Cotton High School in Sedalia and attended the Rolla School of Mines (later University of Missouri-Rolla and now Missouri S&T) before enlisting in the service in 1939.

In the spring of 1940, Whiteman received orders to report to Randolph Field, Texas, for training as an aviator. On November 15, 1940, he was commissioned a second lieutenant in the Army Air Corps (later Army Air Forces) and volunteered for duty in Hawaii early the following year.

As the Japanese attack on Pearl Harbor began, Lt. Whiteman went to his P-40B Warhawk aircraft at Bellows Field and had just lifted off the runway when a burst of Japanese gunfire hit his cockpit, wounding him and throwing the plane out of control. The plane crashed and burned just off the end of the runway. Whiteman died from his injuries.

The news of his death reached his family at 10:13 p.m. the same day. In an interview with the Sedalia Democrat that night, his mother said: "It's hard to believe. It might have happened anytime, anywhere. We've got to sacrifice loved ones if we want to win this war." She gave the reporter a photograph of her son sitting in an aircraft with the inscription "Lucky, lucky me."

Whiteman was one of the first airmen killed during the assault which marked the United States entry into World War II, and is considered the first American pilot killed in aerial combat in World War II while serving under American forces.

On August 24, 1955, 14 years after Whiteman's death, Air Force Chief of Staff Gen. Nathan F. Twining informed Whiteman's mother that the recently reopened Sedalia Air Force Base would be renamed Whiteman Air Force Base in tribute to her son. The dedication and renaming ceremony took place on December 3, 1955.

== Awards and honors ==

United States Army Air Forces pilot badge
| Silver Star | Purple Heart | |
| American Defense Service Medal with service star | Asiatic-Pacific Campaign Medal with bronze campaign star | World War II Victory Medal |

=== Silver Star citation ===
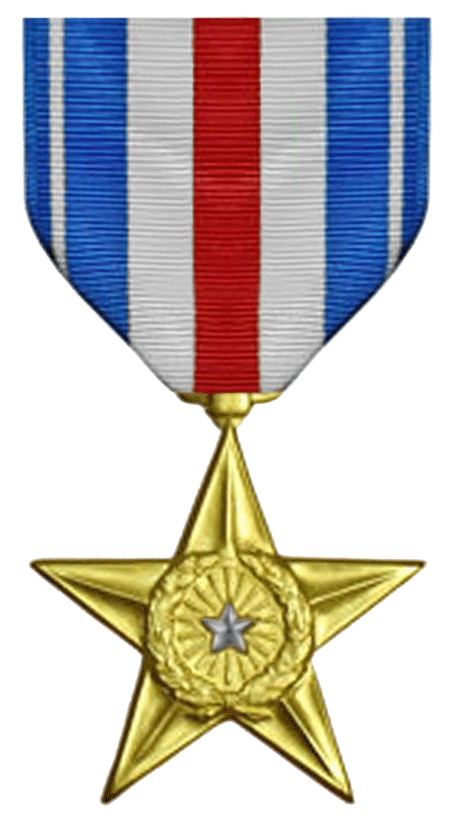

Whiteman, George A.
Second Lieutenant, U.S. Army Air Corps
47th Pursuit Squadron, 18th Pursuit Group
Date of Action: December 7, 1941

Citation:

The President of the United States of America, authorized by Act of Congress July 9, 1918, takes pride in presenting the Silver Star (Posthumously) to Second Lieutenant (Air Corps) George A. Whiteman, United States Army Air Forces, for gallantry in action while serving as a Pilot of the 44th Pursuit Squadron, 18th Pursuit Group, at Bellows Field, Island of Oahu, Territory of Hawaii, on 7 December 1941. When surprised by a heavy air attack by Japanese Forces on Bellows Field and vicinity and while under fire, Second Lieutenant Whiteman attempted to take off to engage the enemy, and while so doing was shot down in flames by enemy aircraft.
