= 442nd Fighter Wing =

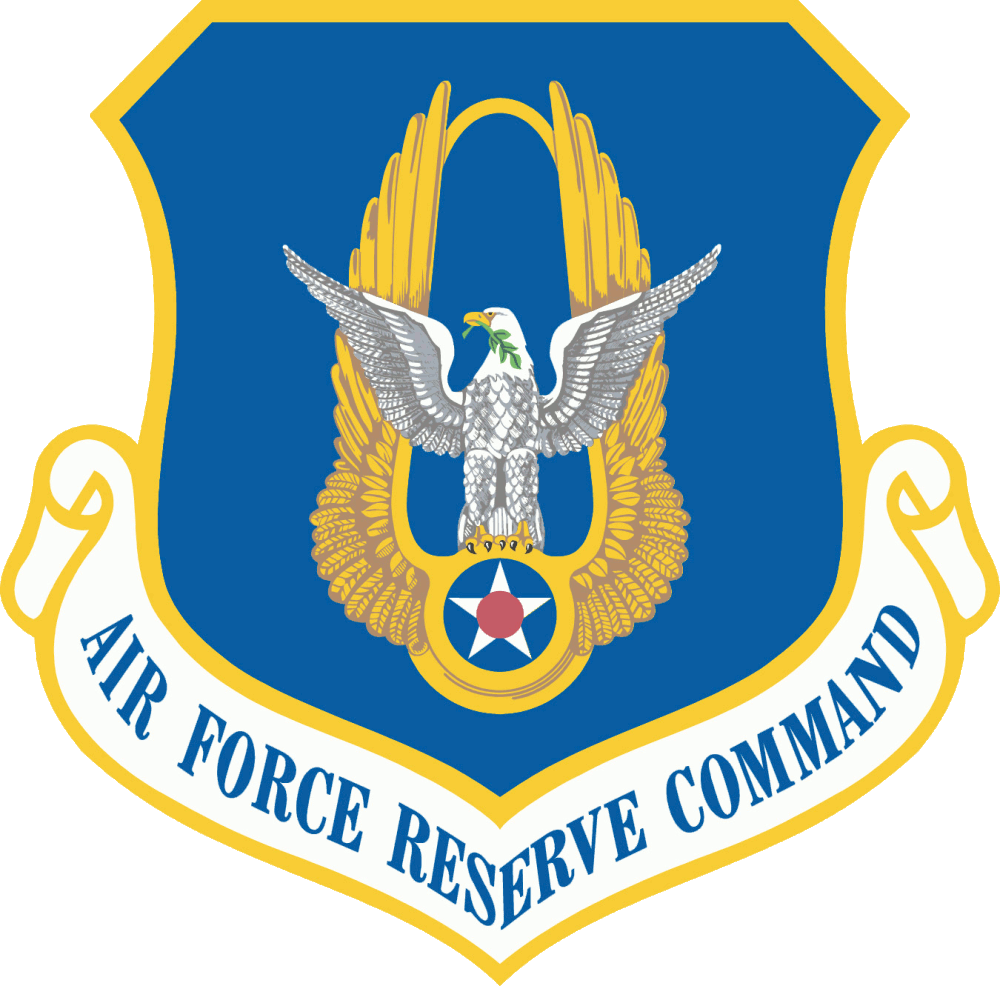
442d Fighter Wing

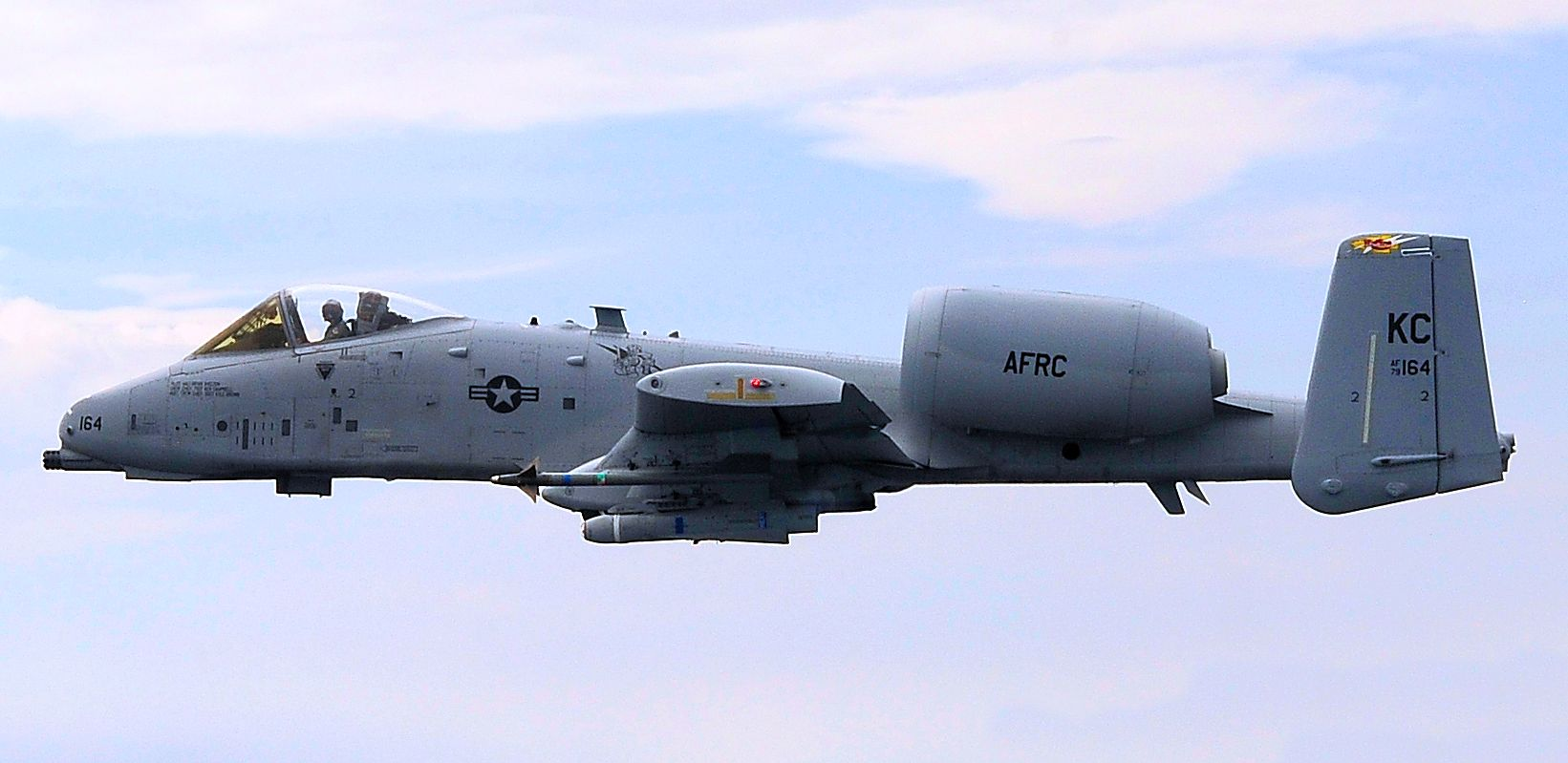
- Wing A-10 Thunderbolt II (Note: Aircraft is Fairchild Republic A-10 Thunderbolt II, serial 79-0164.)
- Active: 1949–1951; 1952–1982; 1984–present
- Country: United States
- Branch: United States Air Force
- Type: Wing
- Role: Fighter
- Size: 1,100 personnel
- Part of: Air Force Reserve Command
- Garrison/HQ: Whiteman Air Force Base, Missouri
- Mottos: Si Jeunesse Savait, Si Vieillesse Pouvait (French for 'If Youth Knew, If Age Could') 1955–1996
- Decorations: Air Force Outstanding Unit Award; Republic of Vietnam Gallantry Cross with Palm

Commanders
- Wing Commander: Col. Rick E. Mitchell
- Deputy Commander: Vacant
- Command Chief: CMSgt Nathan L. Parks

Insignia
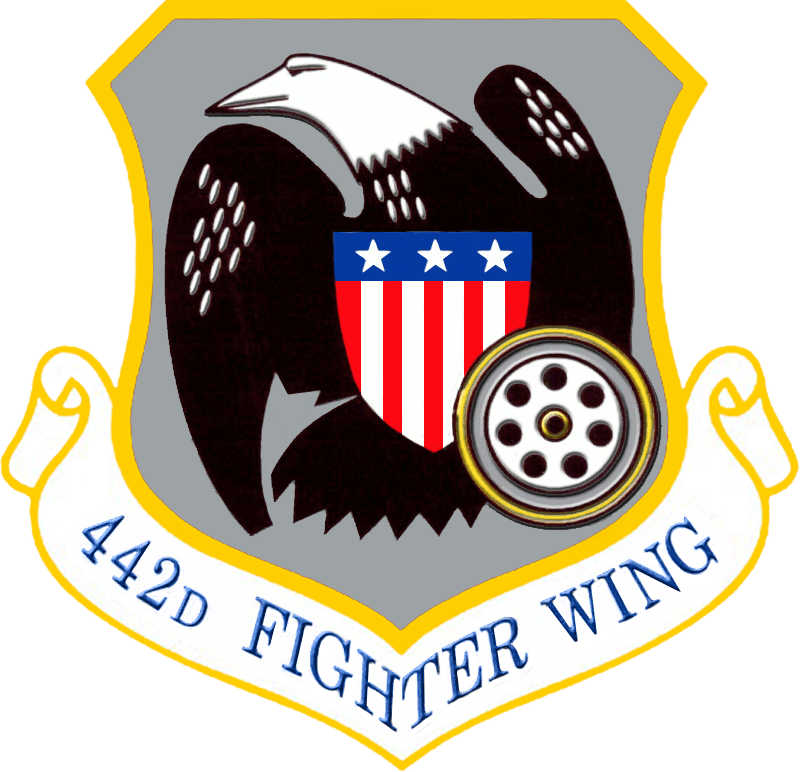
- 442d Fighter Wing emblem (Note: Approved 3 January 1996.)

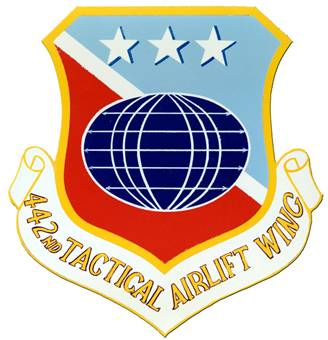
- 442d Troop Carrier Wing emblem (Note: Approved 23 January 1963. Description: Per bend light blue and gules, a bendlet argent, overall an ellipsoid azure gridlined with the latitude lines terminating into arrows on each end of the third [color], in chief three mullets fesswise of the last [color], all within a diminished bordure or.)

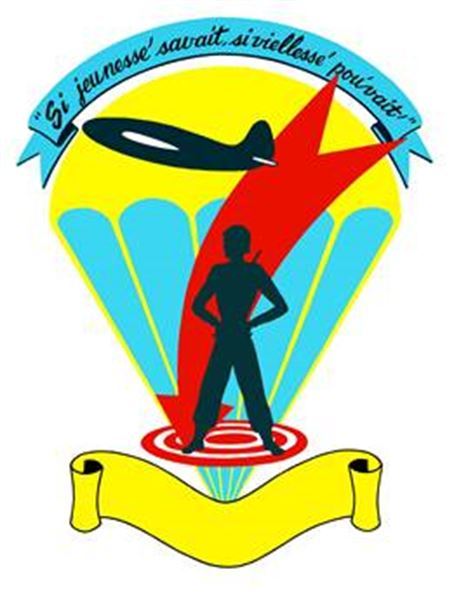
- 442d Troop Carrier Wing emblem (Note: Approved 6 May 1955. Description: Light blue, over a silhouetted parachute Air Force yellow, a target pattern, to base, red and white, charged with an elongated arrow red, standing on the target a silhouetted airman, head uplifted toward a stylized aircraft surmounting the upper section of the parachute all black, the aircraft highlighted white.)
- Tail code: KC
- Tail stripe: Yellow/red

Aircraft flown
- Attack: A-10C Thunderbolt II

The 442d Fighter Wing is an Air Reserve Component of the United States Air Force. It is assigned to Tenth Air Force, Air Force Reserve Command, stationed at Whiteman Air Force Base, Missouri.

== Mission ==
The 442d Fighter Wing trains reserve personnel and the 303rd Fighter Squadron to operate, maintain and support the Fairchild Republic A-10 Thunderbolt II at combat readiness.

== Units ==
The 442nd Fighter Wing is organized like most Air Force wings. There are three groups and a medical squadron under the wing that are physically located at Whiteman Air Force Base:

- 442nd Fighter Wing
  - Headquarters 442nd Fighter Wing
  - 442nd Operations Group
    - 303rd Fighter Squadron – A-10C Thunderbolt II
    - 442nd Operations Support Flight
  - 442nd Maintenance Group
    - 442nd Aircraft Maintenance Squadron
    - 442nd Maintenance Operations Flight
    - 442nd Maintenance Squadron
  - 442nd Mission Support Group
    - 442nd Civil Engineer Squadron
    - 442nd Communications Flight
    - 442nd Force Support Squadron
    - 442nd Logistics Readiness Squadron
    - 442nd Security Forces Squadron
    - 442nd Medical Squadron
  - 476th Fighter Group, Moody Air Force Base, Georgia (supports the 23d Wing)
  - 710th Medical Squadron, Offutt Air Force Base, Nebraska
  - 610th Intelligence Operations Flight, Offutt Air Force Base, Nebraska

== History ==
For related history, see 442nd Operations Group

=== Initial activation and Korean War mobilization ===
The wing was first activated as the 442d Troop Carrier Wing at Fairfax Field, Kansas in June 1949, when Continental Air Command (ConAC) reorganized its flying units under the wing base organization system, which united the flying units and supporting units under a single wing. The wing was equipped with Curtiss C-46 Commandos and Douglas C-47 Skytrains, but also flew trainer aircraft under the supervision of the 2472d Air Force Reserve Training Center. In May 1950 the wing and center moved to nearby Naval Air Station Olathe, Kansas. Although the 442d was manned at only 25% of normal strength, its combat group was authorized four squadrons rather than the three of active duty units.

The 442d was mobilized for the Korean War, as were all reserve combat units. This action was effective on 10 March 1951. Along with other Tenth Air Force units, it was activated in the second wave of reserve units being called up. Its personnel were distributed as fillers to other organizations, with Strategic Air Command getting first pick of these mobilizees. The unit's aircraft were distributed to other organizations as well, and the wing was inactivated two days after its call-up.

=== Return to reserve troop carrier operations ===
The 442d was once again activated at Olathe in June 1952, when it absorbed the resources of the 926th Reserve Training Wing, which was simultaneously inactivated. The reserve mobilization for the Korean war, however, had left the Reserve without aircraft, and the unit did not receive aircraft until July 1952.

In 1955, the Air Force reserve presence at Olathe ended when the wing moved to Grandview Air Force Base, Missouri, which had opened as an Air Defense Command base, with the first active duty units moving there in 1954. The wing move occurred in the same year that the Air Force began detaching Air Force Reserve squadrons from their parent wing locations to separate sites. The concept offered several advantages: communities were more likely to accept the smaller squadrons than the large wings and the location of separate squadrons in smaller population centers would facilitate recruiting and manning. As it finally evolved in the spring of 1955, the Continental Air Command's plan called for placing Air Force Reserve units at fifty-nine installations located throughout the United States. The wing was not impacted by this reorganization until November 1957. At that time, its 305th Troop Carrier Squadron, which had been inactivated in June 1955, was activated at Tinker Air Force Base, Oklahoma to replace the 69th Troop Carrier Squadron, which had moved there earlier.

At the same time, the Joint Chiefs of Staff had been pressuring the Air Force to provide more wartime airlift and about 150 Fairchild C-119 Flying Boxcars became available from the active force. Consequently, in November 1956 the Air Force directed Continental Air Command to convert three fighter bomber wings to the troop carrier mission, while cuts in the budget in 1957 led to a reduction in the number of reserve squadrons from 55 to 45. This included the inactivation of reserve fighter bomber units. The wing gained the 65th Troop Carrier Squadron at Davis Field, when it was activated to replace the 713th Fighter-Bomber Squadron in November 1957.

In the summer of 1956, the wing participated in Operation Sixteen Ton during its two weeks of active duty training. Sixteen Ton was performed entirely by reserve troop carrier units and moved United States Coast Guard equipment From Floyd Bennett Naval Air Station to Isla Grande Airport in Puerto Rico and San Salvador in the Bahamas. After the success of Operation Sixteen Ton, the wing began to use inactive duty training periods for Operation Swift Lift, transporting high priority cargo for the air force and Operation Ready Swap, transporting aircraft engines, between Air Materiel Command's depots. By the mid-1950s, it participated regularly in airdrops, airlift and exercises.

The 442d continued training at Olathe and Grandview with the 2472d Center, but in 1958, some center personnel were absorbed by the wing. In place of active duty support for reserve units, ConAC adopted the Air Reserve Technician Program, in which a cadre of the unit consisted of full-time personnel who were simultaneously civilian employees of the Air Force and held rank as members of the reserves. The transition to the program was completed in 1959. In April 1959 the wing changed to the Dual Deputate organization, (Note: Under this plan flying squadrons reported to the wing Deputy Commander for Operations and maintenance squadrons reported to the wing Deputy Commander for Maintenance.) all flying and maintenance squadrons were directly assigned to the wing.

=== Activation of groups under the wing ===
Although the dispersal of flying units under the Detached Squadron Concept was not a problem when the entire wing was called to active service, mobilizing a single flying squadron and elements to support it proved difficult. This weakness was demonstrated in the partial mobilization of reserve units during the Berlin Crisis of 1961. The wing was called to active service for this crisis in October 1961 and continued to remain on active duty until August 1962, during which time the wing completed conversion to the Douglas C-124 Globemaster II. (Note: Endicott identifies this mobilization as for the Cuban missile crisis. However, the dates and length of mobilization match the Berlin Crisis. Moreover, the wing reorganized to multiple groups in January 1963, and wings mobilized for the Cuban crisis delayed this reorganization until February. Cantwell, p. 289.)

To resolve the mobilization problem, at the start of 1962 ConAC determined to reorganize its reserve wings by establishing groups with support elements for each of its troop carrier squadrons. This reorganization would facilitate mobilization of elements of wings in various combinations when needed. However, as this plan was entering its implementation phase, another partial mobilization occurred for the Cuban Missile Crisis. The formation of troop carrier groups was delayed until January for wings that had not been mobilized. The 935th and 936th Troop Carrier Groups at Richards-Gebaur and the 937th Troop Carrier Group at Tinker were assigned to the wing on 17 January.

The wing also flew overseas missions, particularly to the Far East and Southeast Asia during the Vietnam War. In 1971, the wing began phasing out the C-124 and by 1972, had fully transitioned to the Lockheed C-130 Hercules. In 1975, the wing's gaining command shifted from Tactical Air Command (TAC) to Military Airlift Command (MAC) as part of a USAF-wide shift of tactical airlift assets between the two major commands.

=== Conversion to fighter organization ===
The 442d flew humanitarian and mercy missions on numerous occasions in addition to worldwide airlift operations until conversion, in June 1982, to a fighter mission with the Fairchild Republic A-10 Thunderbolt II aircraft. The 442d again returned to the operational control of TAC and in October 1982, the wing was inactivated while its 442d Tactical Fighter Group continued to train on the new aircraft. In February 1984, the wing was once again activated as the 442d Tactical Fighter Wing and trained for A-10 fighter operations, including close air support, anti-armor, battlefield air interdiction, and combat search and rescue missions.

In 1992, as part of another USAF-wide reorganization, TAC was inactivated and the 442d was renamed as the 442d Fighter Wing under the newly established Air Combat Command. With the pending closure of Richards-Gebaur due to Base Realignment and Closure action, the wing began relocation of its home base to Whiteman Air Force Base, Missouri in 1993, completing the move by 1994.

On a recurring basis from December 1993, the wing deployed personnel and aircraft to Aviano Air Base, Italy, to participate in operations over Bosnia and Herzegovina. It also deployed personnel and aircraft to Kuwait in support of Operation Southern Watch, in September and October 1998.

18 August 2016, the 442nd returned from a deployment to Ämari Air Base, Estonia in support of Operation Atlantic Resolve. The deployment gave the pilots the opportunity to practice highway landings on the Jägala-Käravete Highway in Northern Estonia.

On 2 November 2019, Lt. Col. Tony "Crack" Roe and Maj. John "Sapper" Tice, pilots with the 442nd's 303rd Fighter Squadron received the Distinguished Flying Cross for heroic actions that helped to save the lives of many U.S. servicemen in their respective close air support missions in Afghanistan.

=== War on Terror ===
On 21 April 2018 the wing returned from a 90-day deployment to Kandahar Air Base, Afghanistan, where the wing flew close air support missions for U.S. and Afghan forces. This marked the unit's sixth deployment to Afghanistan since the 9/11 terrorist attacks.

=== A-10 Divestment ===
The wing is expected to retire its A-10s in 2027.

=== F-15E Era ===
On 30 July 2026, Air Force Reserve Command announced that Whiteman AFB had been selected as its “sole candidate location” to host two dozen F-15Es; the Strike Eagles will come from Seymour Johnson Air Force Base, N.C., which is getting the F-15EX. Subject to an environmental impact analysis, and final decision by the Air Force, the first F-15Es are expected to arrive in Fiscal Year 2031.

== Lineage ==
- Established as the 442d Troop Carrier Wing, Medium on 10 May 1949

Activated in the reserve on 27 June 1949
Ordered to active service on 10 March 1951
Inactivated on 12 March 1951

- Activated in the reserve on 15 June 1952

Redesignated 442d Troop Carrier Wing, Heavy on 8 May 1961
Ordered to active service on 1 October 1961
Relieved from active duty on 27 August 1962
Redesignated 442d Air Transport Wing, Heavy on 1 December 1965
Redesignated 442d Military Airlift Wing on 1 January 1966
Redesignated 442d Tactical Airlift Wing on 29 June 1971
Inactivated on 1 October 1982

- Redesignated 442d Tactical Fighter Wing on 21 November 1983

Activated in the reserve on 1 February 1984
Redesignated 442d Fighter Wing on 1 February 1992

=== Assignments ===
- Tenth Air Force, 27 June 1949 – 12 March 1951; 15 June 1952
- Fifth Air Force Reserve Region, 1 September 1960
- Ninth Air Force, 1 October 1961
- Twelfth Air Force, 1 February 1962
- Fifth Air Force Reserve Region, 27 August 1962
- Central Air Force Reserve Region, 31 December 1969
- Fourth Air Force, 8 October 1976 – 1 October 1982
- Tenth Air Force, 1 February 1984 – present

=== Components ===
Groups

- 442d Troop Carrier Group (later 442d Operations Group): 27 June 1949 – 12 March 1951; 15 June 1952 – 14 April 1959; 1 August 1992–present
- 507th Tactical Fighter Group: 20 May – 25 July 1972
- 916th Troop Carrier Group: 1 July 1963 – 8 January 1965
- 917th Troop Carrier Group: 1 July 1963 – 5 February 1965
- 926th Tactical Airlift Group (later 926th Tactical Fighter Group): 1 July 1972 – 1 January 1978; 1 February 1984 – 1 July 1987
- 930th Tactical Fighter Group: 1 July 1987 – 1 August 1992
- 932d Troop Carrier Group (later 932d Military Airlift Group): 1 October 1966 – 1 April 1969
- 934th Tactical Airlift Group: 1 April 1978 – 1 October 1981
- 935th Troop Carrier Group (later 935th Air Transport Group, 935th Military Airlift Group, 935th Tactical Airlift Group): 17 January 1963 – 1 November 1974
- 936th Troop Carrier Group (later 936th Air Transport Group, 936th Military Airlift Group, 936th Tactical Airlift Group): 17 January 1963 – 30 June 1974
- 937th Troop Carrier Group (later 937th Military Airlift Group): 17 January 1963 – 5 February 1965; 21 April 1971 – 20 May 1972

Squadrons

- 65th Troop Carrier Squadron: 16 November 1957 – 14 April 1959
- 303d Troop Carrier Squadron (later 303d Tactoca; Airlift Squadron, 303d Tactical Fighter Squadron, 303d Fighter Squadron): 14 April 1959 – 17 January 1963; 1 November 1974 – 1 October 1982; 1 February 1984 – 1 August 1992
- 304th Troop Carrier Squadron: 14 April 1959 – 17 January 1963
- 305th Troop Carrier Squadron: 14 April 1959 – 17 January 1963

=== Stations ===
- Fairfax Field, Kansas, 27 June 1949
- Naval Air Station Olathe, Kansas, 27 May 1950 – 12 March 1951
- Naval Air Station Olathe, Kansas, 5 June 1952
- Grandview Air Force Base (later Richards-Gebaur Air Force Base), Missouri, 3 April 1955 – 1 October 1982
- Richards-Gebaur Air Force Base, Missouri, 1 February 1984 – 31 March 1994
- Whiteman Air Force Base, Missouri, 1 April 1994 – present

=== Aircraft ===
- North American T-6 Texan, 1949–1950
- Beechcraft T-7 Navigator, 1949–1951
- Beechcraft T-11 Wichita, 1949–1951
- Curtiss C-46 Commando, 1949, 1950–1951; 1952–1957
- Curtiss TC-46 Commando, 1949, 1950–1951
- Douglas C-47 Skytrain, 1949–1950
- Fairchild C-119 Flying Boxcar, 1957–1961, 1966–1967
- Douglas C-124 Globemaster II, 1961–1972
- Lockheed C-130 Hercules, 1971–1982
- Fairchild Republic A-10 Thunderbolt II, 1982–present
