= 937th Training Group =

937th Training Group

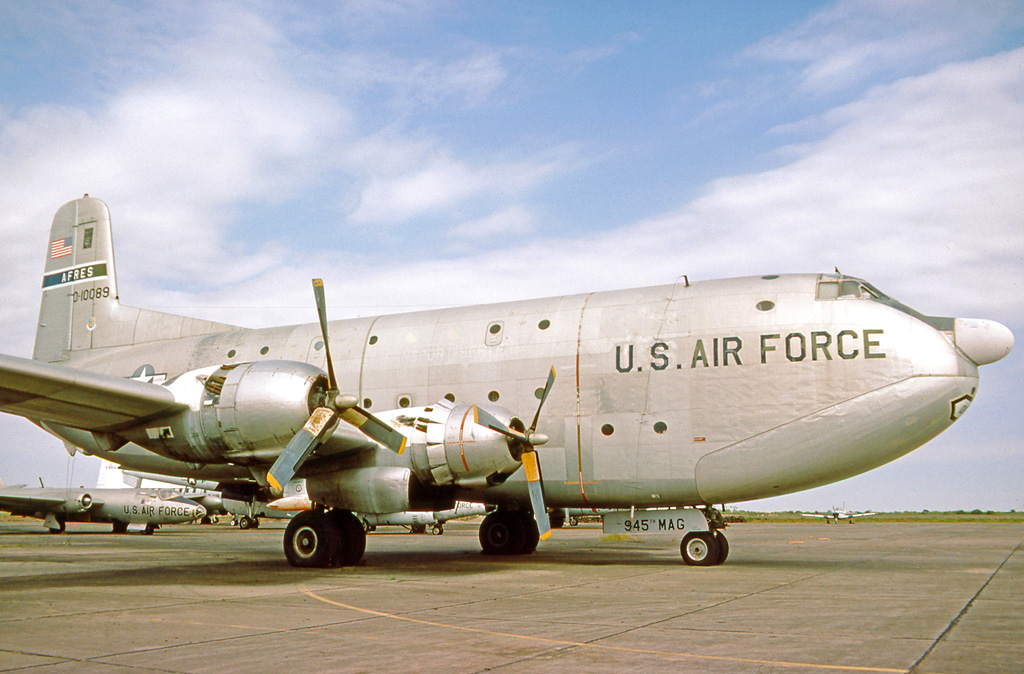
- Air Force Reserve Douglas C-124 (Note: Aircraft is Douglas C-124A-DL Globemaster II, serial 51-089. This airplane is on display at the Museum of Aviation (Warner Robins). Dirkx, Marco (28 July 2025). "1951 USAF Serial Numbers". Joe Baugher’s Serial Number List..)
- Active: 1963–1972; 2011–2016; 2025–present
- Country: United States
- Branch: United States Air Force
- Role: Medical Training
- Part of: Air Education and Training Command
- Garrison/HQ: Joint Base San Antonio
- Decorations: Air Force Outstanding Unit Award; Vietnamese Gallantry Cross with Palm

Commanders
- Current commander: Col Brian Caruthers (2025)

Insignia
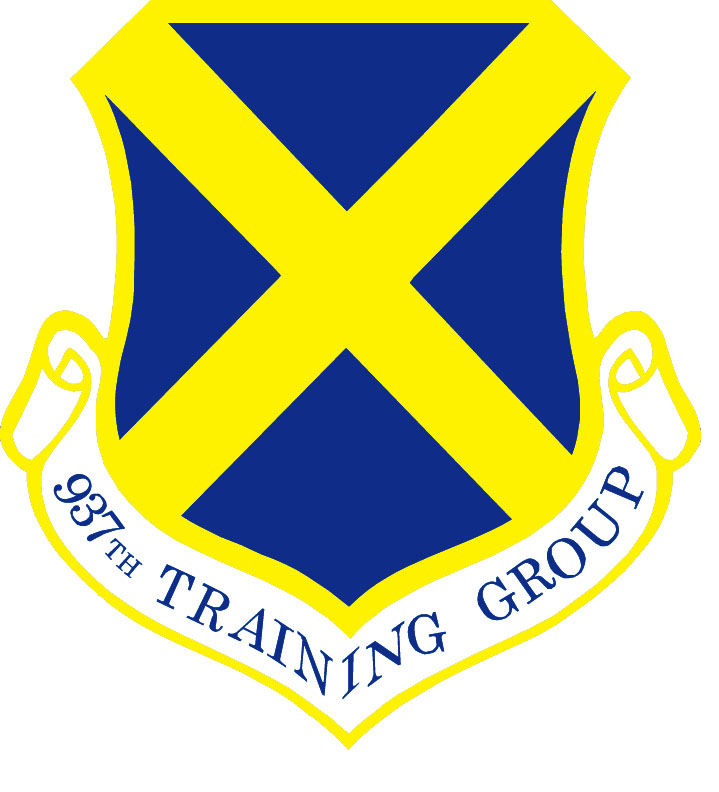
- 937 Training Group emblem (Note: The group uses the 37th Training Wing emblem with the group designation on the scroll. Air Force Instruction 84-105, Organizational Lineage, Honors and Heraldry, 19 March 2013, para 3.3.3.)

The 937th Training Group is a United States Air Force unit stationed at Fort Sam Houston, part of Joint Base San Antonio, Texas. It conducts medical training for the Air Force and is part of the 37th Training Wing.

It was previously active with the 442d Tactical Airlift Wing at Tinker Air Force Base, Oklahoma. The group was activated in January 1963 as the 937th Troop Carrier Group when Continental Air Command formed groups to improve the mobilization capability of its dispersed troop carrier squadrons. It was inactivated on 20 May 1972 and replaced in the reserves at Tinker by the 507th Tactical Fighter Group when the reserve unit at Tinker converted from airlift to fighter aircraft.

== Mission ==
The 937th Training Group trains 16 enlisted Air Force medical specialties and three officer medical specialties across four squadrons and 39 geographically separated locations, offering more than 68 formal courses to develop the next generation of medical experts. It partners with The Medical Education and Training Campus and Air Education and Training Command Surgeon to provide advanced and supplemental courses, internship and degree awarding fellowships through formal courses, symposiums, and other educational partnerships to graduate 12,500 students annually.

== History ==
=== Need for reserve troop carrier groups ===
After May 1959, the reserve flying force consisted of 45 troop carrier squadrons assigned to 15 troop carrier wings. (Note: There were an additional four rescue squadrons not assigned to the wings. Cantwell, p. 156.) The squadrons were not all located with their parent wings, but were spread over thirty-five Air Force, Navy and civilian airfields under what was called the Detached Squadron Concept. The concept offered several advantages. Communities were more likely to accept the smaller squadrons than the large wings and the location of separate squadrons in smaller population centers would facilitate recruiting and manning. However, under this concept, all support organizations were located with the wing headquarters. Although this was not a problem when the entire wing was called to active service, mobilizing a single flying squadron and elements to support it proved difficult. This weakness was demonstrated in the partial mobilization of reserve units during the Berlin Crisis of 1961. To resolve this, at the start of 1962, Continental Air Command, (ConAC) determined to reorganize its reserve wings by establishing groups with support elements for each of its troop carrier squadrons. This reorganization would facilitate mobilization of elements of wings in various combinations when needed.

=== Activation of the 937th Troop Carrier Group ===
As a result, the 937th Troop Carrier Group was established at Tinker Air Force Base, Oklahoma on 17 January 1963 as the headquarters for the 305th Troop Carrier Squadron, which had been stationed there since November 1957. Along with group headquarters, a combat support squadron, materiel squadron and a tactical infirmary were organized to support the 305th. The group was equipped with Douglas C-124 Globemaster IIs for Tactical Air Command airlift operations.

The group was one of three C-124 groups assigned to the 442d Troop Carrier Wing in 1963, the others being the 935th and 936th Troop Carrier Groups at Richards-Gebaur Air Force Base, Missouri.

The group flew overseas missions, particularly to the Far East and Southeast Asia during the Vietnam War. In 1972 the group was inactivated as part of the retirement of the Globemaster II, being one of the last USAF units to fly the C-124. Its place at Tinker was taken by the 507th Tactical Fighter Group. flying Republic F-105 Thunderchiefs, and many members of the 937th transitioned to the new group.

=== Medical training ===
In 2011, USAF training activities at Fort Sam Houston were transferred from the 82d Training Wing to the 37th Training Wing. The group was redesignated the 937th Training Group and replaced the 882d Training Group there. The 937th Training Group was the only medical training group in the Air Force. It conducted basic and advanced medical courses, and graduated nearly 6,000 students a year. The group was inactivated in 2016 and replaced by the 59th Training Group under the 59th Medical Wing. The group was again activated in April 2025, resuming its training duties.

== Lineage ==
- Established as the 937th Troop Carrier Group, Medium and activated on 28 December 1962 (not organized)

Organized in the reserve on 17 January 1963
Redesignated 937th Air Transport Group, Heavy on 1 December 1965
Redesignated 937th Military Airlift Group on 1 January 1966
Inactivated on 20 May 1972

- Redesignated 937th Training Group on 31 August 2011

Activated on 15 September 2011
Inactivated on 20 January 2016
Activated on 30 April 2025

=== Assignments ===
- Continental Air Command, 28 December 1962 (not organized)
- 442d Troop Carrier Wing, 17 January 1963
- 512th Troop Carrier Wing (later 512th Air Transport Wing, 512th Military Airlift Wing), 5 February 1965 – 21 April 1971 (detached after 1 April 1971)
- 442d Military Airlift Wing (later 442d Tactical Airlift Wing), 21 April 1971 – 20 May 1972
- 37th Training Wing 15 September 2011 - 20 January 2016
- 37th Training Wing, 30 April 2025 – present

=== Components ===
- 305th Troop Carrier Squadron (later 305th Air Transport Squadron, 305th Military Airlift Squadron, 305th Tactical Airlift Squadron), 17 January 1963 – 20 May 1972
- 381st Training Squadron, 15 September 2011 – 20 January 2016, 30 April 2025 – present
- 382d Training Squadron, 15 September 2011 – 20 January 2016, 30 April 2025 – present
- 383d Training Squadron, 15 September 2011 – 20 January 2016, 30 April 2025 – present
- 937th Training Support Squadron, 15 September 2011 – 20 January 2016, 30 April 2025 – present

=== Stations ===
- Tinker Air Force Base, Oklahoma, 17 January 1963 – 20 May 1972
- Joint Base San Antonio, 15 September 2011 – present

=== Aircraft ===
- Douglas C-124 Globemaster II, 1963-1972
