= 935th Tactical Airlift Group =

935th Tactical Airlift Group

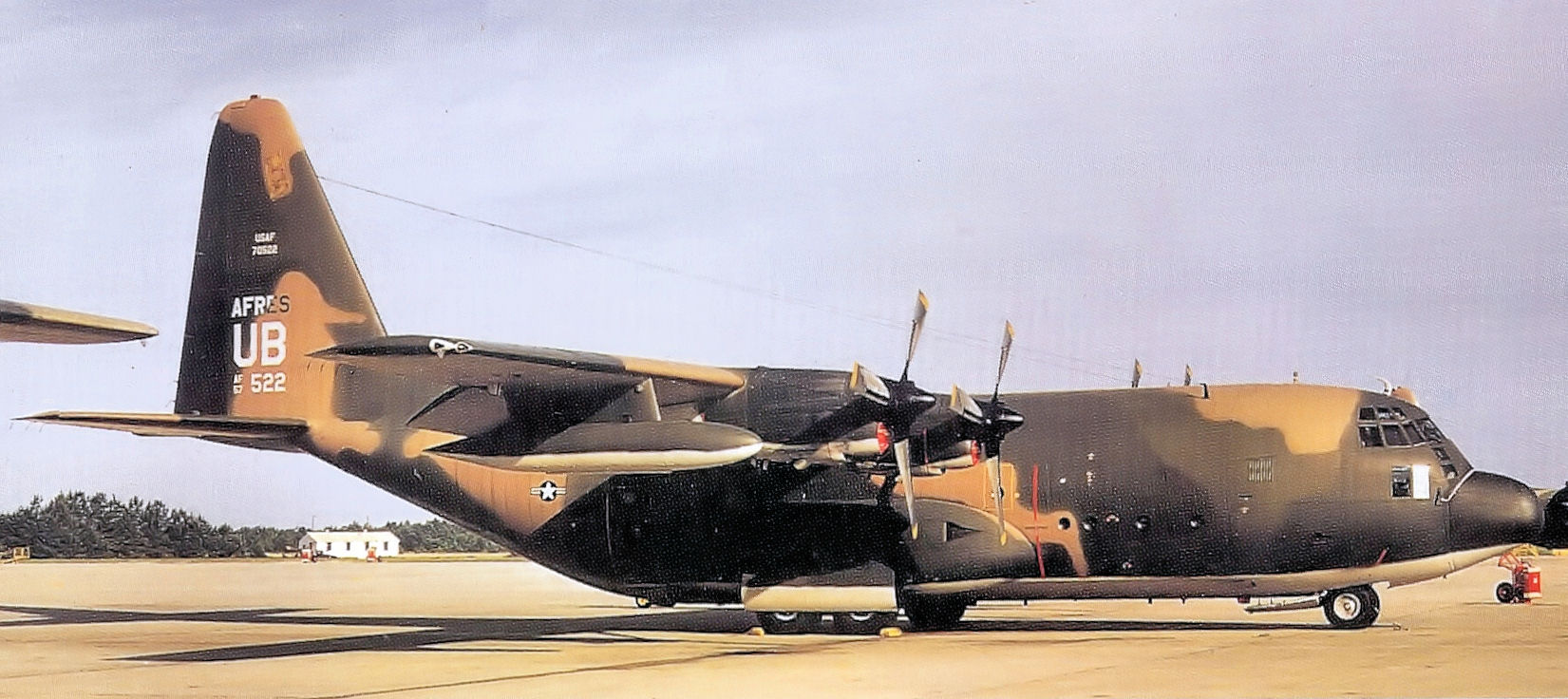
- C-130 Hercules of the Air Force Reserves (Note: Aircraft is Lockheed C-130A-55-LM Hercules serial 57-522, taken at Richards-Gebaur AFB about 1974.)
- Active: 1963–1974
- Country: United States
- Branch: United States Air Force
- Role: Airlift
- Part of: Air Force Reserve

The 935th Tactical Airlift Group is an inactive United States Air Force Reserve unit. It was last active with the 442d Tactical Airlift Wing at Richards-Gebaur Air Force Base, Missouri, where it was inactivated on 1 November 1974

== History ==
=== Need for reserve troop carrier groups ===
After May 1959, the reserve flying force consisted of 45 troop carrier squadrons assigned to 15 troop carrier wings. (Note: There were an additional four rescue squadrons not assigned to the wings. Cantwell, p. 156) The squadrons were not all located with their parent wings, but were spread over thirty-five Air Force, Navy and civilian airfields under what was called the Detached Squadron Concept. The concept offered several advantages. Communities were more likely to accept the smaller squadrons than the large wings and the location of separate squadrons in smaller population centers would facilitate recruiting and manning. However, under this concept, all support organizations were located with the wing headquarters. Although this was not a problem when the entire wing was called to active service, mobilizing a single flying squadron and elements to support it proved difficult. This weakness was demonstrated in the partial mobilization of reserve units during the Berlin Crisis of 1961. To resolve this, at the start of 1962, Continental Air Command, (ConAC) determined to reorganize its reserve wings by establishing groups with support elements for each of its troop carrier squadrons. This reorganization would facilitate mobilization of elements of wings in various combinations when needed.

=== Activation of the 935th Troop Carrier Group ===
As a result, the 935th Troop Carrier Group was established at Richards-Gebaur Air Force Base, Missouri on 17 January 1963 as the headquarters for the 303d Troop Carrier Squadron, which had been stationed there since April 1955. Along with group headquarters, a Combat Support Squadron, Materiel Squadron and a Tactical Infirmary were organized to support the 303d.

If mobilized, the group was gained by Tactical Air Command (TAC), which was also responsible for its training. Its mission was to organize, recruit and train Air Force reservists in the tactical airlift of airborne forces, their equipment and supplies and delivery of these forces and materials by airdrop or landing. The group was equipped with Douglas C-124 Globemaster IIs for TAC airlift operations.

The group was one of three C-124 groups assigned to the 442d Troop Carrier Wing in 1963, the others being the 936th Troop Carrier Group, also at Richards-Gebaur, and the 937th Troop Carrier Group, at Tinker Air Force Base, Oklahoma.

The group flew overseas missions, particularly to the Far East and Southeast Asia during the Vietnam War. In 1971, the group began phasing out the C-124 and by 1972, had fully transitioned to the Lockheed C-130 Hercules.

Inactivated in 1974 and the 303d Squadron was assigned directly to the 442d Wing.

== Lineage ==
- Established as the 935th Troop Carrier Group, Heavy and activated on 28 December 1962 (not organized)

Organized in the reserve on 17 January 1963
Redesignated 935th Air Transport Group, Heavy on 1 December 1965
Redesignated 935th Military Airlift Group on 1 January 1966
Redesignated 935th Tactical Airlift Group on 29 June 1971
Inactivated on 1 November 1974

=== Assignments ===
- Continental Air Command, 28 December 1962 (not organized)
- 442d Troop Carrier Wing (later 442d Air Transport Wing, 442d Military Airlift Wing, 442d Tactical Airlift Wing), 17 January 1963 – 1 November 1974

=== Components ===
- 303d Troop Carrier Squadron (later 303d Air Transport Squadron, 303d Military Airlift Squadron, 303d Tactical Airlift Squadron), 17 January 1963 – 1 November 1974

=== Stations ===
- Richards-Gebaur Air Force Base, Missouri, 17 January 1963 – 1 November 1974

=== Aircraft ===
- Douglas C-124 Globemaster II, 1963–1971
- Lockheed C-130 Hercules, 1971–1974
