= Whiteman Air Force Base =

US Air Force base near Knob Noster, Missouri, United States

- Near Knob Noster, Missouri, in United States of America
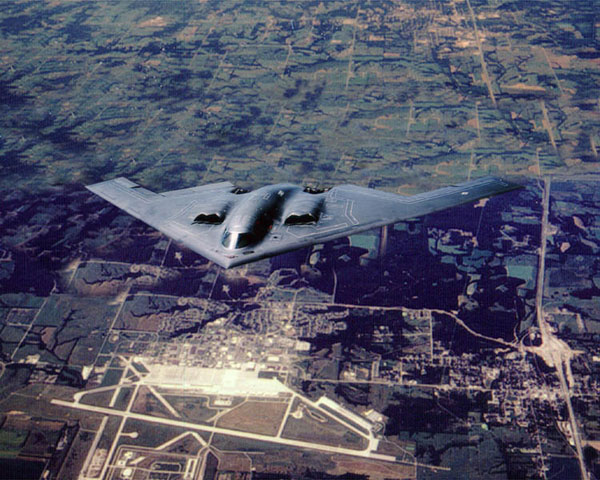
- A B-2A Spirit from the 509th Bomb Wing flying over Whiteman AFB.

Site information
- Type: US Air Force Base
- Owner: Department of Defense
- Operator: United States Air Force
- Controlled by: Air Force Global Strike Command (AFGSC)
- Condition: Operational
- Website: www.whiteman.af.mil

Location
- Location within North America Location within the United States Location within Missouri
- Coordinates: 38°43′49″N 93°32′55″W

Site history
- Built: 1942 (as Sedalia Glider Base)
- In use: since 1942

Garrison information
- Current commander: Colonel Keith J. Butler
- Garrison: 509th Bomb Wing (Host)

Airfield information
- Identifiers: IATA: SZL, ICAO: KSZL, FAA LID: SZL, WMO: 724467
- Elevation: 265.4 metres (871 ft) AMSL
Runways
Direction	Length and surface
01/19	3,779.5 metres (12,400 ft) Concrete

Whiteman Air Force Base (IATA: SZL, ICAO: KSZL, FAA LID: SZL) is a United States Air Force base located just south of Knob Noster, Missouri, United States. It is operated by the Air Force Global Strike Command, as the base for all 19 operational B-2 Spirit nuclear-capable stealth bombers, as well as for A-10 Thunderbolt attack aircraft and others. There is also a sizable Missouri Air National Guard presence on base.

The base is approximately 60 miles (100 km) east-southeast of Kansas City in rural Johnson County. Originally established as the Sedalia Glider Base, it was later renamed after 2nd Lt George Whiteman, a native Missourian who was killed during the attack on Pearl Harbor. The facility covers 5,566 acres (8.7 sq mi; 22.5 km^{2}) and is maintained by the 509th Civil Engineer Squadron. During the Cold War, Whiteman played a significant role in the American nuclear triad, with a total of 150 Minuteman intercontinental ballistic missiles (ICBMs) built in the vicinity of the base, later dismantled as part of arms reductions.

Following the end of the Cold War era, the base became home to the B-2 bomber force beginning in the 1990s and continues to play a crucial role in the US nuclear deterrent. B-2 bombers have flown non-stop flights from Whiteman for bombing campaigns in Yugoslavia, Afghanistan, Iraq, Libya, and Iran.

== History ==
=== World War II ===
In 1942, the United States Army Air Corps selected the site of the present-day base to be the home of Sedalia Glider Base, a training base for WACO glider pilots. In May 1942, construction workers began building a railroad spur for the new air base in an area known to locals as the "Blue Flats" because of the color of the soil. The new railroad line was built by the Missouri Pacific Railroad. The base was officially opened on 6 August 1942. On 12 November 1942, the name was changed to Sedalia Army Air Field.

After the end of World War II, operations at the airfield declined, and many of the buildings were abandoned. In December 1947, the base was put on inactive status.

=== 340th Bomb Wing ===
In August 1951, the base was renamed again, to Sedalia Air Force Base, as it was now part of the United States' newest military service branch, the United States Air Force.

In October 1952, the base was turned over to the 340th Bombardment Wing. Improvements were made to the 1942 runway, as well as other base facilities, and Strategic Air Command (SAC) scheduled the base to receive squadrons flying the B-47 Stratojet and the KC-97 Stratofreighter. The first B-47 landed at the base in March 1954.

On 3 December 1955, the base was renamed Whiteman Air Force Base in honor of 2nd Lieutenant George A. Whiteman, an Army Air Corps pilot who was killed during the Japanese attack on Pearl Harbor while attempting to take off from Bellows Field. Whiteman was born in Longwood, Missouri, and graduated from Smith-Cotton High School in Sedalia, less than 20 miles from the base that would bear his name.

=== ICBM era ===
In 1963, Whiteman AFB transitioned from being a bomber base to a missile base. SAC activated the 351st Strategic Missile Wing at Whiteman on 1 February. On 1 September, having retired its B-47 and KC-97 aircraft, the remnants of the 340th Bombardment Wing were transferred to Bergstrom AFB, Texas where it assumed control of the B-52 Stratofortress and KC-135 Stratotanker assets of the inactivating 4130th Strategic Wing.

The transition of Whiteman AFB from a bomber base to missile base required massive military construction projects. 867,000 cubic yards of earth and rock were excavated to make room for underground launch facilities and 15 launch control centers. 168,000 yards of concrete, 25,355 tons of reinforcing steel, and 15,120 tons of structural steel were used in the effort, and a vast underground intersite cable network was installed.

The 351st employed the LGM-30 Minuteman weapons system, an ICBM capable of hitting targets up to 4300 miles away. In the mid-1960s, the Minuteman I missiles were replaced in favor of the Minuteman II, an ICBM with increased range and an improved guidance system. They were tipped with 1.2 megaton W56 thermonuclear warheads. Beginning in the late 1960s, 10 of the 150 active missiles had their warheads swapped with Emergency Rocket Communications System (ERCS) transmitters, which would ensure communication with surviving American strategic forces in the event of a nuclear war.

In the 1980s, Whiteman AFB became the first missile base to field an all-female Minuteman missile crew, as well as the first male and female Minuteman crew. The 351st Missile Wing and its three squadrons of Minuteman II ICBMs were inactivated on 31 July 1995, as a result of planned phaseout of the Minuteman II.

=== B-2 era ===
At the 1986 Reykjavik Summit between U.S. President Ronald Reagan and the new Soviet General Secretary Mikhail Gorbachev, the United States and the Soviet Union agreed to a drawdown of nuclear arms via two treaties: the INF Treaty and START I. This led to the eventual phase-out of the Minuteman II systems at Whiteman, and put the future of the base in question. On 5 January 1987, congressman Ike Skelton, representing Missouri's 4th district, announced that Whiteman would be the home of the USAF's new Advanced Technology Bomber, later named the B-2 Spirit.

On 30 November 1988, SAC announced that the 509th Bomb Wing would divest its FB-111 and KC-135 aircraft, relocate from its then-home station of Pease AFB, New Hampshire, which was being realigned as an Air National Guard base pursuant to BRAC, and become the nation's first operational B-2 bomber unit. On 17 December 1993, Whiteman's first B-2 touched down on the installation's runway. A total of 21 B-2s were produced, 19 of which are still operational, and all are based at Whiteman.

On 1 April 1994, the 442nd Fighter Wing of the Air Force Reserve Command relocated to Whiteman with their A-10 Thunderbolt II aircraft to become a tenant command following the BRAC-directed closure of their former home station, Richards-Gebaur AFB, Missouri.

On 10 December 2022, a B-2 suffered an in-flight malfunction and made an emergency landing, with an onboard fire being extinguished by base firefighting personnel; there were initially no other details released, and the Air Force has thus far declined to state what caused the accident. The aircraft was subsequently declared a total loss as a consequence of the duration and costs of potential repairs, and was retired from service. The nineteen remaining B-2 aircraft were temporarily grounded and checked for safety defects.

In June 2025, during the Twelve-Day War, seven stealth bombers from the airbase were sent to strike Iranian nuclear program sites. The bombers completed their mission, dropping GBU-57 Massive Ordnance Penetrator 'bunker-buster' bombs and successfully returned to the airbase, having traveled to Iran and back. The operation was called "Operation Midnight Hammer" by the Americans.

In December 2025, a Chinese national was arrested for taking photographs of B-2 aircraft as well as the base's perimeter fencing, later pleading guilty in federal court. In January 2026, Missouri Secretary of State Denny Hoskins commenced the process to shut down a business adjacent to the base, reported to be affiliated with Guo Wengui, a former Chinese intelligence agent.

== Based units ==
Units marked 'GSU' are geographically separate units that are based at Whiteman, but are subordinate to a parent unit based at another location.

=== United States Air Force ===
Air Force Global Strike Command (AFGSC)

- Eighth Air Force
  - 509th Bomb Wing (Host Wing)
    - Headquarters 509th Bomb Wing
    - 509th Operations Group
      - 13th Bomb Squadron – B-2A Spirit, T-38A Talon
      - 393rd Bomb Squadron – B-2A Spirit
      - 509th Operations Support Squadron
    - 509th Maintenance Group
      - 509th Aircraft Maintenance Squadron
      - 509th Maintenance Operations Flight
      - 509th Maintenance Squadron
      - 509th Munitions Squadron
    - 509th Medical Group
    - 509th Mission Support Group
      - 509th Civil Engineering Squadron
      - 509th Communications Squadron
      - 509th Contracting Squadron
      - 509th Force Support Squadron
      - 509th Logistics Readiness Squadron
      - 509th Security Forces Squadron

Air Combat Command (ACC)

- Twelfth Air Force
  - 432nd Wing / 432nd Air Expeditionary Wing
    - 25th Attack Group
      - 20th Attack Squadron (GSU) – MQ-9A Reaper
- US Air Force Warfare Center
  - 53rd Wing
    - 53rd Test and Evaluation Group
      - 72nd Test and Evaluation Squadron (GSU) – B-2A Spirit
  - 57th Wing
    - US Air Force Weapons School
      - 325th Weapons Squadron (GSU) – B-2A Spirit

Air Force Reserve Command (AFRC)

- Tenth Air Force
  - 442nd Fighter Wing
    - Headquarters 442nd Fighter Wing
    - 442nd Operations Group
      - 303rd Fighter Squadron – A-10C Thunderbolt II
      - 442nd Operations Support Flight
    - 442nd Maintenance Group
      - 442nd Aircraft Maintenance Squadron
      - 442nd Maintenance Operations Flight
      - 442nd Maintenance Squadron
    - 442nd Mission Support Group
      - 442nd Civil Engineer Squadron
      - 442nd Communications Flight
      - 442nd Force Support Squadron
      - 442nd Logistics Readiness Squadron
      - 442nd Security Forces Squadron
    - 442nd Medical Squadron

Air National Guard (ANG)

- Missouri Air National Guard
  - 131st Bomb Wing
    - Headquarters 131st Bomb Wing
    - 131st Operations Group
      - 110th Bomb Squadron – B-2A Spirit
      - 131st Operations Support Flight
    - 131st Maintenance Group
      - 131st Aircraft Maintenance Squadron
      - 131st Maintenance Squadron
      - 131st Maintenance Operations Flight
    - 131st Medical Group
    - 131st Mission Support Group
      - 131st Civil Engineer Squadron
      - 131st Communications Flight
      - 131st Contracting Squadron
      - 131st Force Support Squadron
      - 131st Logistics Readiness Squadron
      - 231st Civil Engineer Flight
      - 239th Combat Communications Squadron

=== United States Army ===
Missouri Army National Guard

- 35th Infantry Division
  - 35th Combat Aviation Brigade
    - 135th Aviation Regiment
      - 1st Battalion (Assault) – UH-60M Black Hawk

=== United States Navy ===
Navy Expeditionary Combat Command (NECC)

- Coastal Riverine Force
  - Coastal Riverine Group One
    - Coastal Riverine Squadron 11 (GSU)

== In popular culture ==
Whiteman AFB is a setting for the 1983 ABC made-for-television film The Day After, where the base's 150 Minuteman missiles are launched and their silos subsequently destroyed in a nuclear exchange with the Soviet Union.
