= Peray Airfield =

Abandoned airfield located in Northern France

Peray Airfield Advanced Landing Ground (ALG) A-44
- Pays de la Loire Region, France
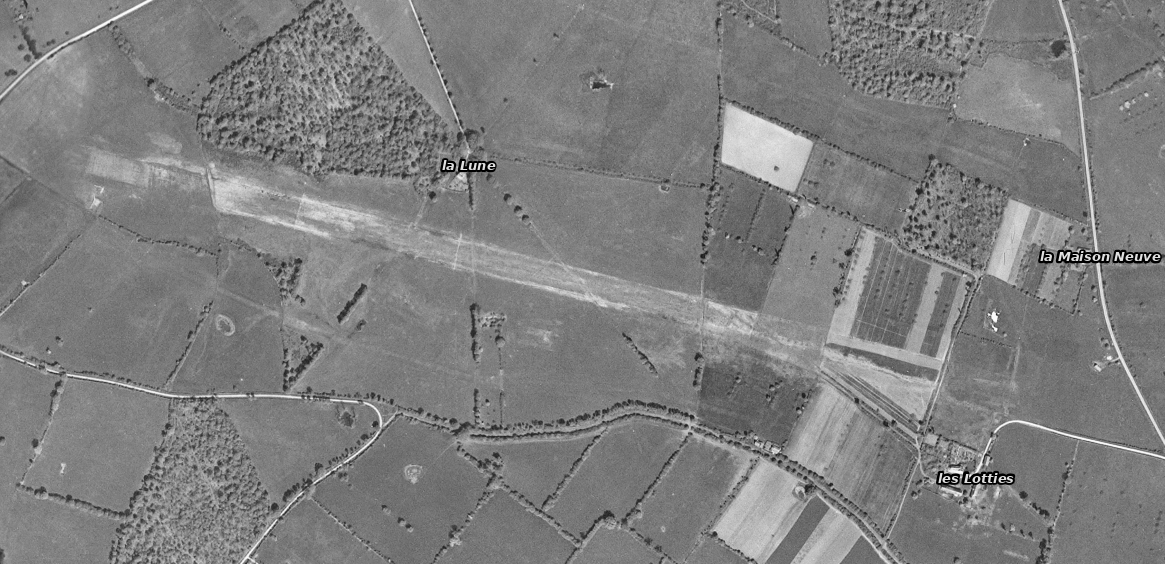
- Aerial view of the remains of the Peray Airfield (A-44) taken on 19 April 1949 Peray Airfield (France)

Site information
- Type: Military airfield
- Controlled by: United States Army Air Forces

Location
- Coordinates: 48°13′56″N 000°22′46″E

Site history
- Built by: IX Engineering Command
- In use: September- November 1944
- Materials: Prefabricated Hessian Surfacing (PHS)
- Battles/wars: Western Front (World War II); Eastern France/Benelux Campaign

Peray Airfield is an abandoned World War II military airfield, which is located near the commune of Peray in the Pays de la Loire region of northern France.

Located about 1 mile south of Peray, the United States Army Air Force established a temporary airfield on 20 August 1944. The airfield was constructed by the IX Engineering Command, 819th Engineer Aviation Battalion.

== History ==
Known as Advanced Landing Ground "A-44", the airfield consisted of a single 5000' (1500m) Prefabricated Hessian Surfacing runway aligned 10/28. In addition, tents were used for billeting and also for support facilities; an access road was built to the existing road infrastructure; a dump for supplies, ammunition, and gasoline drums, along with a drinkable water and minimal electrical grid for communications and station lighting.

The 367th Fighter Group, based P-38J Lightning fighters at Peray from 4 to 8 September 1944. The 367th was replaced by the 442d Troop Carrier Group, which flew C-47 Skytrains from the airfield from 5 October until 7 November 1944

The fighter planes flew support missions during the Allied invasion of Normandy, patrolling roads in front of the beachhead; strafing German military vehicles and dropping bombs on gun emplacements, anti-aircraft artillery and concentrations of German troops in Normandy and Brittany when spotted.

After the Americans moved east into Central France with the advancing Allied Armies, the airfield was closed on 20 November 1944. Today the remains of the runway can be seen in a mixture of agricultural fields.
