= Saint-André-de-l'Eure Airfield =

Saint-André-de-l'Eure Airport Aérodrome de Saint-André-de-l'Eure Advanced Landing Ground B-24
- IATA: none; ICAO: LFFD

Summary
- Airport type: Public
- Location: Saint-André-de-l'Eure, France
- Elevation AMSL: 489 ft / 149 m
- Coordinates: 48°53′43″N 001°15′05″E

Map
- Location of Saint-André-de-l'Eure Airport

Runways
Direction	Length		Surface
Direction	ft	m	Surface
05/23	3,609	1,093	Grass

Saint-André-de-l'Eure Airfield (ICAO: LFFD) is a recreational aerodrome in France, located about 10 miles southwest of Évreux (Normandy). It supports general aviation with no commercial airline service scheduled.

== History ==
The aerodrome was built in the 1930s as a regional airport in the Haute-Normandie, probably using a circular grass airfield, with airplanes taking of in any direction into the prevailing wind at the time of takeoff.

=== German use during World War II ===
It was seized by the Germans during the Battle of France in 1940 and was used during the German Occupation of France as a major Luftwaffe combat airfield. Its initial use was by Jagdgeschwader 2 (JG 2), in late June 1940 which was being rotated though several different airfields in northwest France flying Messerschmitt Bf 109Es.

Left unused for over a year while construction of concrete runways, taxiways and other permanent facilities took place, several bomber units Kampfgeschwader 30 (KG 30) with Junkers Ju 88As, and Kampfgeschwader 55 (KG 55) with Heinkel He 111Hs used St-André for night bomber attacks against England from July 1941 until April 1942. Both were sent to the Eastern Front as the bombing campaign over England began to wind down.

From July 1942 onward, St-André was used primarily as a day interceptor fighter airfield against the USAAF Eighth Air Force heavy bomber offensive over Occupied Europe and Germany. A succession of fighter units began using the base for interceptor mission in 1942, JG 25 and SKG 10, both flying Focke-Wulf Fw 190As until June 1943 when the base was temporarily taken off operational status for repairs and upgrades. St-André became operational again in late April 1944 with a series of units using the airfield with Messerschmitt Me 410As, Ju 88As, Junkers Ju 188A, and Bf 109G fighter interceptors until the Luftwaffe was driven from the airfield in mid July 1944 by the advancing Allied ground forces in the Northern France campaign.

St-André was a frequent target of American attacks, being bombed on numerous occasions in 1943 and 1944. Also, USAAF Ninth Air Force Martin B-26 Marauder medium bombers and Republic P-47 Thunderbolts attacked the airfield mostly with 500-pound General-Purpose bombs; unguided rockets and .50 caliber machine gun sweeps to attack the German interceptors on the ground. The attacks were timed to have the maximum effect possible on the jets to keep the jet interceptors pinned down on the ground and be unable to attack the heavy bombers. Also the North American P-51 Mustang fighter-escort groups of Eighth Air Force would drop down on their return to England and attack the base with a fighter sweep and attack any target of opportunity to be found at the airfield.

=== Allied use during World War II ===
With German army units driven from the area, the USAAF IX Engineer Command's 877th Engineer Aviation Battalion moved into the area and began putting down concrete patches over the damaged runways. It was turned over to the British and was designated as Advanced Landing Ground "B-24". St-André was used by RAF and Commonwealth units as a fighter airfield for the remainder of the war. The USAAF 442d Troop Carrier Group flew C-47 Skytrain transports from the field between November 1944 and September 1945 when the airfield was returned to French control.

=== Current status ===
The airfield was completely reconstructed after the war and today is a modern, provincial aerodrome which is used for light aircraft. The airfield is home to a WWII aviation flying museum, Ham and Jam.

Its wartime history is evident in the many relics remaining from the war. Both 5,200-foot concrete runways remain, abandoned since the war; the many concrete patches over the bomb craters left by American air attacks are quite evident, with vegetation growing out of some. Many taxiways and aircraft dispersal pads can be found in the area, and the location of the wartime support facilities visible by the taxiways leading to their now abandoned sites. Several wooded areas to the southeast of the airfield are connected by now single-track concrete roads; within them are likely many wartime relics of destroyed buildings and other facilities common to Luftwaffe bases of the era.
