= Miami (disambiguation) =

Miami is a city in the U.S. state of Florida.

Miami may also refer to:

== Native Americans ==
- Miami Nation of Indiana, an unrecognized tribe (those exempt from forced removal)
- Miami people, a Native American ethnic group
- Miami Tribe of Oklahoma, a federally recognized tribe (those forcibly removed)

== Places and geographical features ==
=== United States ===
==== Historical ====
- Fort Miami (Indiana)
- Fort Miami (Michigan)
- Fort Miami (Ohio)

==== Populated places ====
Listed alphabetically by state

- Miami, Arizona, a town in Gila County
- Miami Beach, Florida
- Miami metropolitan area, Florida, with Miami being the largest city in the area
- Miami-Dade County, Florida
- Miami, Indiana, an unincorporated community in Miami County
- Miami, Missouri, a city in Saline County
- Miami Station, Missouri, an unincorporated community in Carroll County
- Miami, New Mexico, an unincorporated community in Colfax County
- Miami, Ohio (disambiguation), several communities with variant names
- Miami, Oklahoma, a city in Ottawa County
- Miami, Texas, a town in Roberts County
- Miami, West Virginia, an unincorporated community in Kanawha County

See also

- Miami County (disambiguation)
- Miami Township (disambiguation)

==== Rivers and geographical features ====
- Miami River (New York)
- Miami River (Oregon)
- St. Joseph River (Lake Michigan), a river; formerly Rivière des Miamis (River of the Miamis)
- Florida
  - Lake Okeechobee, Florida, once known as Mayaimi, also known as Florida's Inland Sea, a freshwater lake
  - Miami Canal in Florida
  - Miami River (Florida)
- Ohio
  - Great Miami River, in Ohio
  - Little Miami River in Ohio
  - Miami Valley in Ohio

=== Outside the United States ===
- Miami (neighborhood), in Alexandria, Egypt
- Miami, Manitoba, Canada
- Miami, Queensland, Australia
- Miami, alternate name of Meyami, Iran

== Arts and entertainment ==
=== Films ===
- Miami (1924 film), a lost American silent film
- Miami (2017 film), a Finnish film

=== Albums ===
- Miami (Babasónicos album), 1999
- Miami (James Gang album), 1974
- Miami (Damien Saez album), or the title song, 2013
- Miami (The Go Find album), 2004
- Miami (The Gun Club album), 1982
- Miami (Izzy Stradlin album), 2007
- M.I.A.M.I., a 2004 album by Pitbull
- Miami (Starflyer 59 EP), 2020

=== Songs ===
- "Miami" (Counting Crows song), 2002
- "Miami" (Manuel Riva song), 2018
- "Miami" (Morgan Wallen song), 2025
- "Miami" (Nicki Minaj song), 2018
- "Miami" (Will Smith song), 1998
- "Miami 2017 (Seen the Lights Go Out on Broadway)", by Billy Joel
- "Enough (Miami)", by Cardi B, 2024
- "Miami", by Against Me! from Searching for a Former Clarity, 2005
- "Miami", by Bob Seger and the Silver Bullet Band from Like a Rock, 1986
- "Miami", by Caroline Rose from The Art of Forgetting, 2023
- "Miami", by Foals from Total Life Forever, 2010
- "Miami", by John Mellencamp from John Cougar, 1979
- "Miami", by Kali Uchis featuring Bia from Isolation, 2018
- "Miami", by Randy Newman from Trouble in Paradise, 1983
- "Miami", by Taking Back Sunday from Louder Now, 2006
- "Miami", by Tory Lanez featuring Gunna from Love Me Now?, 2018
- "Miami", by U2 from Pop, 1997
- "Miami - Ma Ma Ma Ma Mia", a song by Adithi Singh Sharma, Manisha Eerabathini, Rita from the 2018 Indian film Chal Mohan Ranga

=== Other uses in arts and entertainment ===
- Miami (book), a 1987 book by Joan Didion
- The Miami Showband, an Irish group from the 1960s onwards, sometimes billed simply as Miami

== Schools ==
- Miami University, Oxford, Ohio
- University of Miami, Coral Gables, Florida
- Miami International University of Art & Design, Florida
- Miami High School (disambiguation)

== Sports ==
- Miami Dolphins, an American professional football team competing in NFL
- Miami Heat, a professional basketball team competing in NBA
- Miami Hurricanes, the athletic program of the University of Miami in the U.S. state of Florida
- Miami Marlins, a professional baseball team competing in MLB
- Inter Miami CF, a professional soccer club team competing in MLS
- Miami RedHawks, the athletic program of Miami University in the U.S. state of Ohio
- Huntington Miamis, a minor league baseball team

== Transportation ==
- Miami (Amtrak station), a train station in the U.S. city of Miami, Florida
- City of Miami (train), a seven-car coach streamliner in use from 1940 to 1971
- Miami Intermodal Center, an intermodal transit station serving the Miami, Florida, metropolitan area in the United States
- Miami International Airport, which serves the Miami, Florida, metropolitan area
- Miami Metrorail, a rapid transit system serving the Miami, Florida, metropolitan area
- Miami-Dade Transit, the public transit authority of the Miami, Florida, metropolitan area

== Other uses ==
- USS Miami (SSN-755), a decommissioned nuclear attack submarine
- Miami (soil), a soil series
- Miami, an Internet TCP/IP stack program for Amiga
- "Miami", nickname of Jim Beach (born 1942), British lawyer and longtime manager of the rock band Queen
- Miami Trip, a type of amusement ride.

== See also ==
- Miami-Illinois language, the language spoken by the Miami tribe
- Maimi Yajima (born 1992), Japanese singer
- Mayaimi, a Native American people who lived around Lake Okeechobee
- Miami Airport (disambiguation)
- North Miami (disambiguation)
- Port Miami (disambiguation)
- Fort Miami (disambiguation)
