= Miami Township, Ohio =

Miami Township, Ohio may refer to:

- Miami Township, Clermont County, Ohio
- Miami Township, Greene County, Ohio
- Miami Township, Hamilton County, Ohio
- Miami Township, Logan County, Ohio
- Miami Township, Montgomery County, Ohio

== See also ==
- Miami Township (disambiguation)
