= Miami Airport (disambiguation) =

Miami airport, Miami aeroport, Miami aerodrome, Miami airfield or variation, may refer to:

== Miami-Dade, Florida ==
=== Airports ===
- Miami International Airport (IATA aerodrome code: MIA, ICAO airport code: KMIA, FAA airfield code: MIA), Miami-Dade County, Florida, USA; formerly Wilcox Field; serving the city of Miami
- Miami Executive Airport (IATA aerodrome code: TMB, ICAO airport code: KTMB, FAA airfield code: TMB), Miami-Dade County, Florida, USA; formerly Kendall-Tamiami Executive; serving the city of Miami
- Miami-Opa Locka Executive Airport (IATA aerodrome code: OPF, ICAO airport code: KOPF, FAA airfield code: OPF), Miami-Dade County, Florida, USA; formerly Opa-locka Airport; serving the cities of Miami and Opa-Locka
  - Coast Guard Air Station Miami, USCG air station
- Miami Homestead General Aviation Airport (FAA airfield code: X51), Miami-Dade County, Florida, USA; formerly Homestead Airport
- Miami Army Airfield, Miami, Miami-Dade, Florida, USA; a former WWII airforce base that shut down after the Cuban Missile Crisis
- Miami Seaplane Base (FAA airfield code: X44), Watson Island, Miami, Florida, USA
- Miami Heliport, Watson Island, Miami, Florida, USA

=== Other ===
- Miami-Dade Aviation Department, airport authority for Miami-Dade, operating several regional airports
- Miami Airport (Tri-Rail station), new commuter rail station serving Miami International Airport
- Hialeah Market/Miami Airport (Tri-Rail station), old commuter rail station serving Miami International Airport
- Miami Airport Expressway (S.R. 112) connecting Miami International Airport to Miami Beach

== Other airports ==
- Miami County Airport (FAA airfield code: K81), Miami County, Kansas, USA; serving the city of Paola
- Miami Municipal Airport (IATA aerodrome code: MIO, ICAO airport code: KMIO, FAA airfield code: MIO), Miami, Ottawa County, Oklahoma, USA
- Miami University Airport (IATA aerodrome code: OXD, ICAO airport code: KOXD, FAA airfield code: OXD), Butler County, Ohio, USA; a public airport serving the city of Oxford, operated by Miami University
- Miami Valley Hospital Heliport (FAA airfield code: 00OI), Dayton, Montgomery County, Ohio, USA; a private hospital heliport
- Kruger Mpumalanga International Airport (IATA aerodrome code: MQP, ICAO airport code: FAKN), Mpumalanga, South Africa; its initials (KMIA) are the same as the Miami airport's ICAO airport code

== Other uses ==
- Airport 24/7: Miami, a Travel Channel USA reality TV program documenting activity at Miami International Airport

== See also ==
- Port Miami (disambiguation)
- Airport (disambiguation)
- Miami (disambiguation)
