= Miami metropolitan area (disambiguation) =

The Miami metropolitan area is the metropolitan area centered on Miami, Florida.

The Miami metropolitan area may also refer to:

- The Miami, Oklahoma micropolitan area, United States

== See also ==
- Miami (disambiguation)
