= Miami River =

Miami River may refer to:

== In Ohio ==
- Great Miami River, a tributary of the Ohio River
- Little Miami River, a tributary of the Ohio River
- Maumee River, referred to in the Ohio Constitution as the Miami River of the Lake

== Elsewhere ==
- St. Joseph River (Lake Michigan), a river; formerly Rivière des Miamis (River of the Miamis)
- Miami River (Florida), a tributary of Biscayne Bay
- Miami River (New York), a tributary of Lewey Lake
- Miami River (Oregon), a tributary of Tillamook Bay

== See also ==
- Maumee River, Indiana and Ohio
- Miami (disambiguation)
