= North Miami (disambiguation) =

North Miami may stand for:

- North Miami, Florida
- North Miami, Oklahoma
- North Miami High School
- North Miami Community Schools
- North Miami Beach, Florida

== See also ==
- Miami (disambiguation)
- North Beach (Miami Beach)
