= Miami, Ohio =

Miami is the autonym for the Miami people (Miami–Illinois: Myaamiaki), a Great Lakes tribe who historically occupied territory in present-day U.S. states of Indiana, Michigan, and Ohio. While there is no longer any place in Ohio known simply as Miami, the term is part of the name of several places in the Miami Valley region of southwest Ohio.

== Geographical features ==
- Great Miami River, a tributary of the Ohio River
- Little Miami River, a tributary of the Ohio River
- Miami Valley, the region surrounding the Great Miami River in southwestern Ohio

== Populated places ==
- Miami Villa, Ohio, an unincorporated community in Montgomery County
- Miamisburg, Ohio, a city in Montgomery County
- Miamitown, Ohio, an unincorporated community in Hamilton County
- Miamiville, Ohio, an unincorporated community in Clermont county
- New Miami, Ohio, a village in Butler County

== County and county subdivisions ==
- Miami County, Ohio
- Miami Township, Clermont County, Ohio
- Miami Township, Greene County, Ohio
- Miami Township, Hamilton County, Ohio
- Miami Township, Logan County, Ohio
- Miami Township, Montgomery County, Ohio

== Historical place names ==
- Fort Miami (Ohio), a fort built on the Maumee River

== Other uses ==
- Miami University, public research university in Oxford, Ohio, sometimes referred to as "Miami of Ohio"
  - Miami RedHawks, the intercollegiate sports program of Miami University
- Miami and Erie Canal, canal in Ohio that used to run from Toledo to Cincinnati
- Miami Valley Career Technology Center, public career technology school in Englewood, Ohio
- Miami Valley Conference, high school athletic league
- Miami Valley Today, regional newspaper
- Premier Health Miami Valley Hospital, hospital in Dayton, Ohio
- Miami Valley Council, local council of the Boy Scouts of America
