= Continental Air Command =

Former U.S. Air Force major command

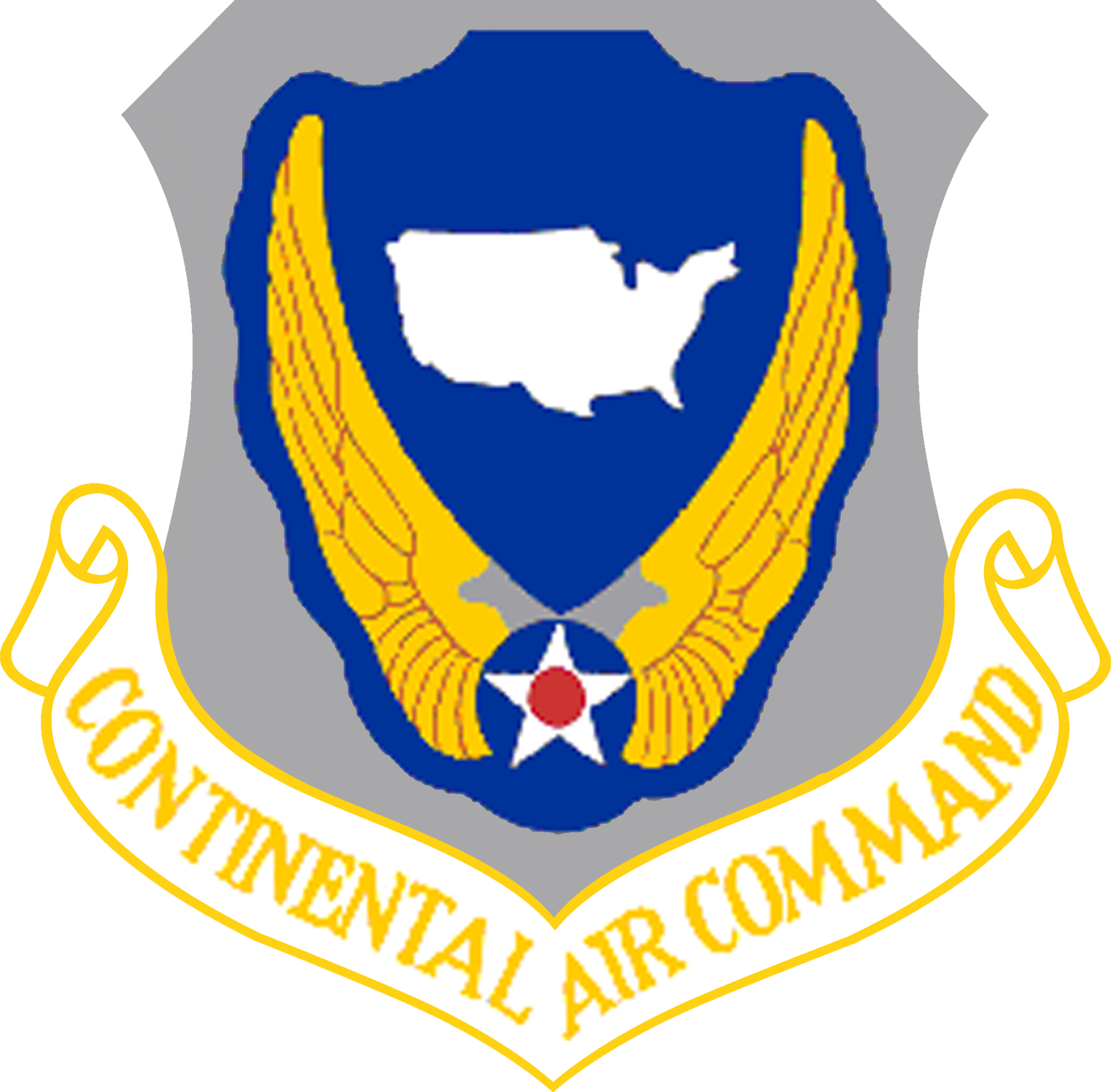
- Continental Air Command emblem
- Active: 1948–1968
- Country: United States
- Branch: United States Air Force
- Type: Major Command
- Role: Air National Guard and Air Force Reserve command and control
- Part of: United States Air Force
- Garrison/HQ: Mitchell AFB, New York (1948–1961); Robins AFB, Georgia (1961–1968)

Continental Air Command (ConAC) (1948–1968) was a Major Command of the United States Air Force (USAF) responsible primarily for administering the Air National Guard and Air Force Reserve.

During the Korean War, ConAC provided the necessary augmentation to the regular Air Force while it rebuilt itself under wartime conditions. Later, during the 1950s, it was a training force for reservists with no prior military service. ConAC provided peacetime airlift missions for the Air Force. It was mobilized twice in 1961 and 1962 by president Kennedy for the Berlin and Cuban Missile Crisis. Lastly, it was used by president Lyndon B. Johnson for airlift operations into the Dominican Republic and South Vietnam.

It was inactivated in 1968 and replaced by Headquarters, Air Force Reserve (AFRES).

== History ==
=== Origins ===
After the end of World War II, the Truman Administration was determined to bring the Federal budget back into balance. An enormous deficit had built up, so expenditure was cut, resulting in relatively little money for the new United States Air Force to modernize its forces.

Officials of the Army Air Forces were convinced that the service required some kind of a reserve force in peacetime, although they had no clear concept of what the size and scope of such an effort should be. Consisting of duly appointed officers and enlisted personnel the Air Reserve was to be a federally controlled reserve component of the Air Forces, ready for mobilization and active duty at the time, places, and in the numbers indicated by the needs of national security. Planning for reserve forces took second place, in any event, to the officials' efforts to win the separation of the air forces from the Army. Their single firm conviction about the nature of the reserve program was that it must provide opportunities for pilots to fly.

This was fundamentally different from the National Guard concept. The National Guard is the designated state militia by the Constitution of the United States. Although the Air National Guard fulfills state and some federal needs, it fails to satisfy others. In the first place, not every person in the United States with an obligation or desire for military service wants to serve in a state militia. Second, the legally prescribed nature and organization of the National Guard does not provide for service as individuals; the guard consists of units only.

In 1944, the National Guard Association of the United States compelled the Army Air Forces to plan for a significant separate Air National Guard reserve force separate from the observation units of the prewar National Guard units controlled by the Army. As the Army Air Forces demobilized in 1945 and 1946, inactivated unit designations were allotted and transferred to various State Air National Guard bureaus. As individual units were organized, they began obtaining federal recognition, and the state Air National Guard units were established.

=== Army Air Forces Air Reserve program ===
The Army Air Forces Air Reserve program was approved by the War Department in July 1946. Army Air Forces Base Units (reserve training) were organized by Air Defense Command (ADC) at each training location. They were located at both Army Airfields and civil airports where the Air Force retained partial jurisdiction after turning over the facility to the civil community after the end of World War II. ADC was given the air reserve mission as the fundamental mission of the command was the air defense of the Continental United States, and the reservists were considered as reinforcements for that mission; however the reserve program was a national endeavor and the Army Air Forces required both Strategic Air Command and Tactical Air Command to conduct some form of reserve training on their bases.

The reservists were to report to a base unit located in their area. The base unit furnished the personnel to operate the detachment and provided essential base services. ADC programmed to have AT-6 Texans, AT-11 Kansans and P-51 Mustangs available for reserve pilots to fly four hours per month to train and maintain proficiency. ADC intended to activate forty base units operational by 1 July. The 468th Army Air Forces Base Unit (Reserve Training) at Memphis Municipal Airport (MAP), Tennessee, reservists conducted the first postwar Air Reserve training flight in an airplane, probably a C-47, borrowed from the 4th Ferrying Group. By the end of 1946, the command had organized Air Reserve training detachments at seventy bases and airfields. However, limited budgets for the active Army Air Corps meant even less for Reserve Training and a lack of available aircraft (especially the single-seat P-51) led to severe constraints on the Reserve program with training being conducted in World War II training aircraft, which cost much less to operate than single-seat fighter planes. On 21 February 1947, Headquarters Army Air Forces informed ADC to eliminate twenty-nine reserve training detachments as quickly as possible. The program's contractions caused by the fiscal year 1947 budget reductions made it even more evident that there would never be enough units to accommodate all Air Force Reservists who wished to be trained.

The Air Force Reserve was affected by fundamental legislation pertaining to the parent Air Force. Even after the Unification Act of September 1947 established the United States Air Force, much of the statutory authority upon which it operated still stemmed from various laws pertaining to the U.S. Army. Under criticism for the inadequacy of its Air Force Reserve program, the new United States Air Force began to revise it in 1948. Contrary to the tendency of the Army Air Forces to orient the Reserve program as an individual augmentation force, it was decided that the Air Force's mobilization requirements called for organized units, both for training and combat. It recommended that all Air Force Reservists be organized into tactical or training units to facilitate administration and training.

=== Post World War II Air Force Reserve ===
See: Air National Guard for ConAC History.

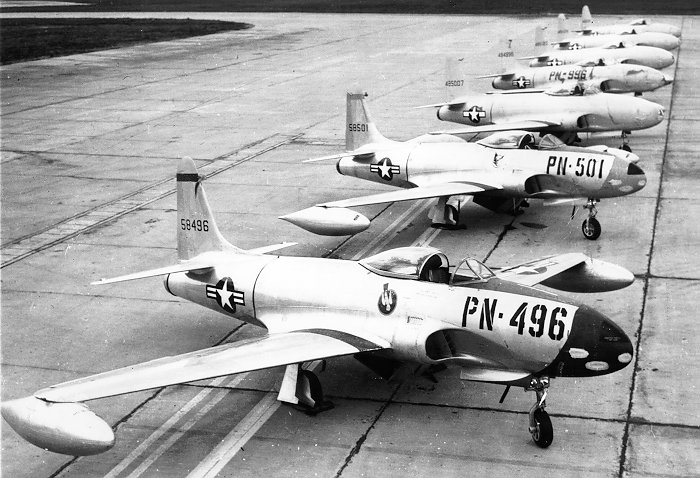
ConAC Fourth Air Force 1st Fighter Wing Lockheed P-80s at March AFB, California 1948.

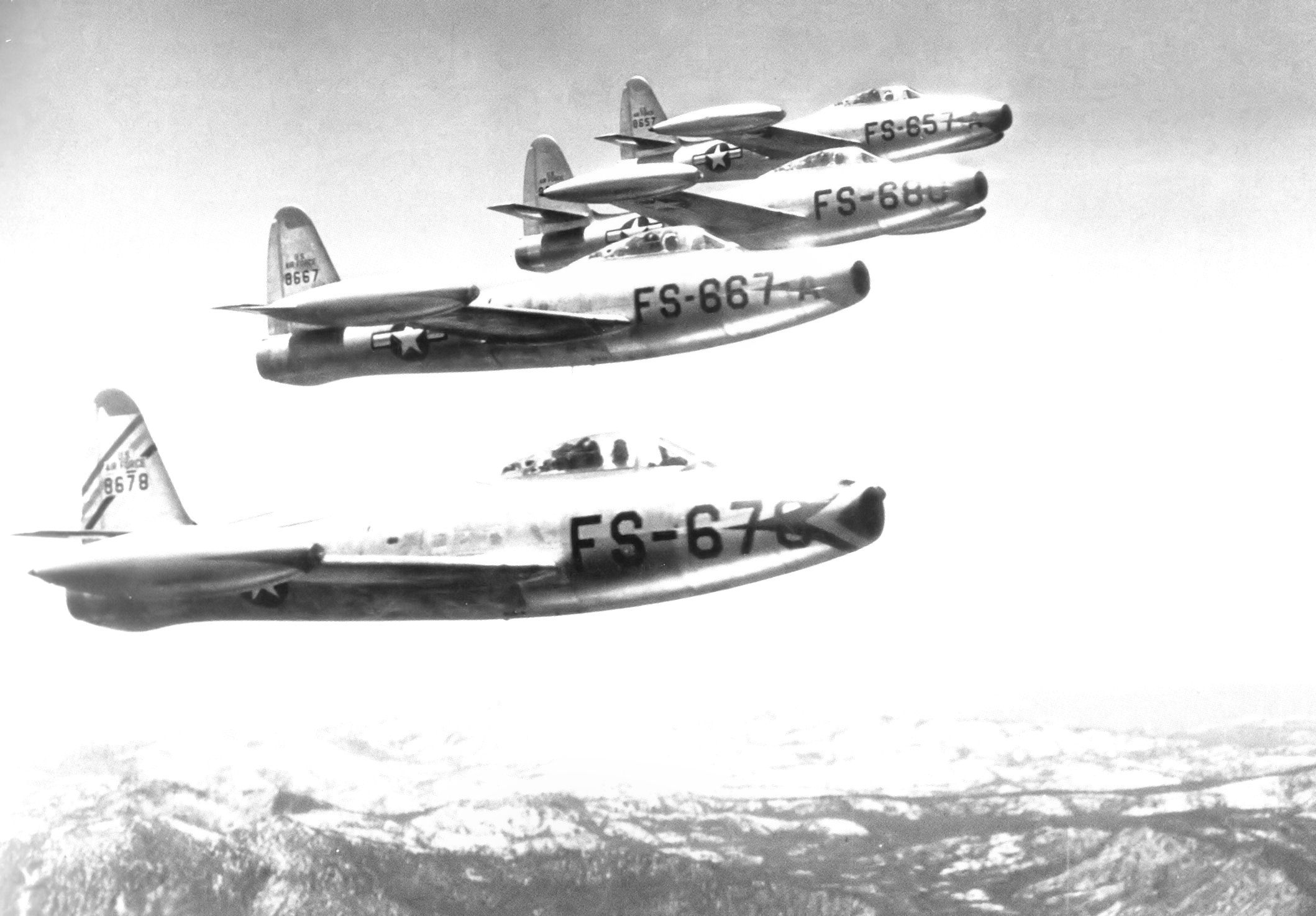
78th Fighter Group, Jet Republic F-84B Thunderjets at Hamilton AFB, 1949. Aircraft are (bottom to top) Republic F-84D-10-RE Thunderjet 48-678, 667, 680, 657

To clarify the situation and provide both services sounder legal bases from which to operate, Congress passed the Army and Air Force Authorization Act of 1949 which became law on 10 July 1950. The law stipulated that the Air Force of the United States would consist of the U.S. Air Force (the Regular Air Force), the Air National Guard of the United States, the Air National Guard when it was in the service of the United States, and the U.S. Air Force Reserve. The Air Force of the United States was to have an authorized strength of not more than seventy groups with separate Air Force squadrons, reserve groups, and whatever supporting and auxiliary and reserve units as might be required.

The Air Force established the Office of the Special Assistant to the Chief of Staff for Reserve Forces in Headquarters USAF. It also reorganized its field structure for reserve matters, establishing the Continental Air Command (ConAC) on 1 December 1948, with headquarters at Mitchel AFB, New York. ConAC had responsibility for both Air Force Reserve as well as coordination with the state-controlled Air National Guard organizations. At the same time, the Air Defense Command and the Tactical Air Command were subordinated as operational air commands of the new organization. ConAC controlled the First, Fourth, Tenth and Fourteenth Air Forces. The Ninth and Twelfth Air Forces remained under TAC control, although they were assigned to ConAC.

The Air Force Reserve program for fiscal year 1950 consisted of four distinct parts: the Air Force Reserve training centers now would support reserve combat wings, individual mobilization assignments, a new program of corollary units integrated with active force units, and a Volunteer Air Reserve training program to accommodate all reservists not fitted into one of the other three programs. Headquarters USAF and the major commands were to conduct the corollary unit and mobilization assignment programs while ConAC would handle the rest. ConAC was to operate 23 centers to train 25 combat wings. The Air Force Reserve program was to become effective on 1 July 1949 would include twenty troop carrier wings equipped with C-47s or C-46s and five light bombardment wings flying B-26s.

With regards to Air Defense Command and Tactical Air Command, ConAC faced severe issues as the tactical air support mission was fundamentally different from the air defense mission. Units assigned to ConAC were dual-trained and in case of war, were expected to revert to their primary roles after the North American air defense battle was won.

=== Korean War ===
With the outbreak of the Korean War in June 1950, it was necessary to deploy large numbers of tactical aircraft to Japan and South Korea.

The Korean War gave a new emphasis to tactical air operations and resulted in the restoration of Tactical Air Command as a major air command on 1 December 1950 and relieved it from assignment to ConAC. TAC's mission would be to supply these tactical forces to FEAF and USAFE, and also be able to deploy its CONUS forces worldwide in response to Cold War threats by Communist China and the Soviet Union. In addition, the need to support the new NATO alliance meant that entire wings of aircraft would be deployed to Europe for tactical air defense.

The air defense mission, relegated to a secondary status in the postwar years, received much more attention as Cold War tensions heightened. Following the explosion of a Soviet nuclear weapon in August 1949, the Air Force issued requirements for an operational air defense system by 1952. The perceived threat of an airborne atomic attack by the Soviet Union with its Tu-4 copy of the B-29 or Tu-95 strategic bomber led to the separation of Air Defense Command from ConAC, and its reestablishment as an Air Force major command, effective 1 January 1951 to counter the perceived Soviet threat.

==== Reserve Unit Structure, 25 June 1950 ====
Wing	Assignment	Location	Aircraft	Comments
94th Bombardment Wing, Light	Fourteenth Air Force	Marietta AFB, Georgia	B-26 Invader	Ordered to Active Service on 10 March 1951 as a filler unit; Inactivated on 1 April 1951
319th Bombardment Wing, Light	Fourteenth Air Force	Philadelphia IAP, Pennsylvania	B-26 Invader	Ordered to Active Service on 10 March 1951 as a filler unit; Inactivated on 1 April 1951
323d Bombardment Wing, Light	Fourteenth Air Force	Tinker AFB, Oklahoma	B-26 Invader	Ordered to Active Service on 10 March 1951 as a filler unit; Inactivated on 17 March 1951
448th Bombardment Wing, Light	Fourth Air Force	Long Beach MAP, California	B-26 Invader	Ordered to Active Service on 17 March 1951 as a filler unit; Inactivated on 21 March 1951
452d Bombardment Wing, Tactical	Fourth Air Force	Long Beach MAP, California	B-26 Invader	Ordered to Active Service on 10 August 1950; Combat in Korea 10 Dec 1950 – 10 May 1952*, Inactivated on 10 May 1952
63d Troop Carrier Wing	First Air Force	Floyd Bennet NAS, New York	C-47 Skytrain	Ordered to Active Service on 1 May 1951 as a filler unit; Inactivated on 9 May 1951
89th Troop Carrier Wing	First Air Force	Hanscom Apt, Massachusetts	C-46 Commando	Ordered to Active Service on 1 May 1951 as a filler unit; Inactivated on 10 May 1951
349th Troop Carrier Wing	Fourth Air Force	Hamilton AFB, California	C-46 Commando	Ordered to Active Service on 1 April 1951 as a filler unit; Inactivated on 2 April 1951
375th Troop Carrier Wing	First Air Force	Greater Pittsburgh APT, Pennsylvania	C-46 Commando	Ordered to Active Service on 15 October 1950; Trained units for deployment to Korea, Inactivated on 14 July 1952
403d Troop Carrier Wing	Fourth Air Force	Portland MAP, Oregon	C-46 Commando	Ordered to Active Service on 1 April 1951; Combat in Korea 14 April 1952 – 1 January 1953*, Inactivated on 1 January 1953
419th Troop Carrier Wing	Tenth Air Force	Scott AFB, Illinois	C-46 Commando	Ordered to Active Service on 1 May 1951 as a filler unit; Inactivated on 2 May 1951
433d Troop Carrier Wing	First Air Force	Cleveland MAP, Ohio	C-46 Commando	Ordered to Active Service on 1 April 1951; Trained units for deployment to Korea, Inactivated on 14 July 1952
434th Troop Carrier Wing	Tenth Air Force	Atterbury AFB, Indiana	C-47 Skytrain	Ordered to Active Service on 1 May 1951; Trained units for deployment to Korea, Inactivated on 11 February 1953
435th Troop Carrier Wing	Fourteenth Air Force	Miami IAP, Florida	C-46 Commando	Ordered to Active Service on 1 March 1951; Trained units for deployment to Korea, Inactivated on 1 January 1953
436th Troop Carrier Wing	First Air Force	Godman AFB, Kentucky	C-47 Skytrain	Ordered to Active Service on 1 April 1951 as a filler unit; Inactivated on 15 April 1951
437th Troop Carrier Wing	Tenth Air Force	Chicago Orchard APT, Illinois	C-46 Commando	Ordered to Active Service on 10 August 1950; Combat in Korea 8 November 1950 – 10 June 1952*, Inactivated on 1 January 1953
438th Troop Carrier Wing	Tenth Air Force	Offutt AFB, Nebraska	C-46 Commando	Ordered to Active Service on 10 March 1951 as a filler unit; Inactivated on 15 March 1951
439th Troop Carrier Wing	Tenth Air Force	Selfridge AFB, Michigan	C-46 Commando	Ordered to Active Service on 1 April 1951 as a filler unit; Inactivated on 3 April 1951
440th Troop Carrier Wing	Tenth Air Force	Wold-Chamberlain MAP, Minnesota	C-46 Commando	Ordered to Active Service on 1 May 1951 as a filler unit; Inactivated on 4 May 1951
441st Troop Carrier Wing	Tenth Air Force	Chicago Orchard APT, Minnesota	C-46 Commando	Ordered to Active Service on 10 March 1951 as a filler unit; Inactivated on 14 March 1951
442d Troop Carrier Wing	Tenth Air Force	Fairfax Field, Kansas	C-46 Commando	Ordered to Active Service on 10 March 1951 as a filler unit; Inactivated on 12 March 1951
443d Troop Carrier Wing	Fourteenth Air Force	Hensley Field, Texas	C-46 Commando	Ordered to Active Service on 1 May 1951; Trained units for deployment to Korea, Inactivated on 8 January 1953
512th Troop Carrier Wing	First Air Force	Reading MAP, Pennsylvania	C-46 Commando	Ordered to Active Service on 15 March 1951 as a filler unit; Inactivated on 1 April 1951
514th Troop Carrier Wing	First Air Force	Birmingham MAP, Alabama	C-46 Commando	Ordered to Active Service on 1 May 1951; Trained units for deployment to Korea, Inactivated on 1 February 1953
516th Troop Carrier Wing	Fourteenth Air Force	Memphis MAP, Tennessee	C-46 Commando	Ordered to Active Service on 15 April 1951; Trained units for deployment to Korea, Inactivated on 16 January 1953

*See 452d Bombardment Wing, 403d Troop Carrier Wing, and 437th Troop Carrier Wing articles for details of these reserve units activities during the Korean War.

==== Air Force Reserve Mobilization ====
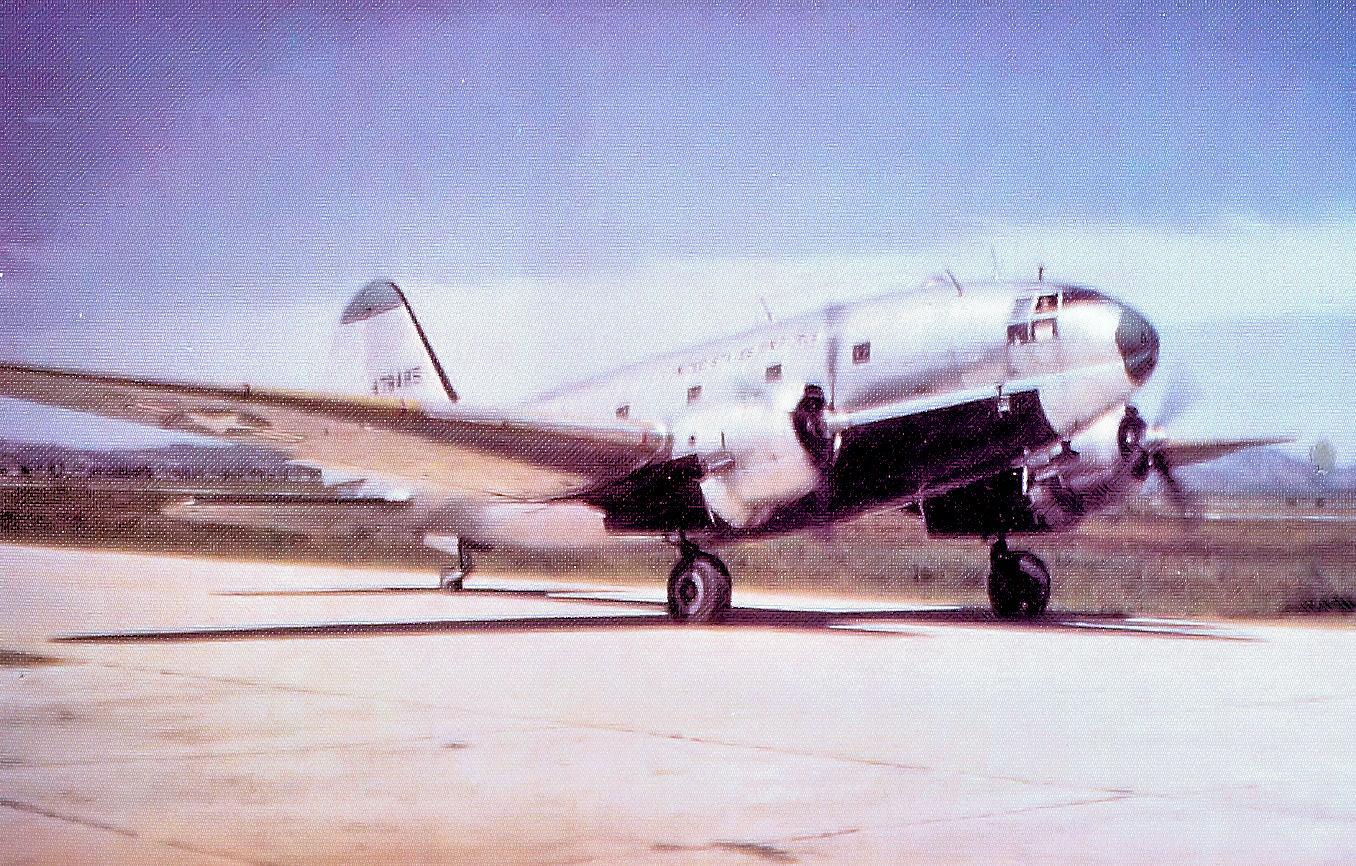
Curtiss C-46D Commando on a South Korean airstrip, 1952

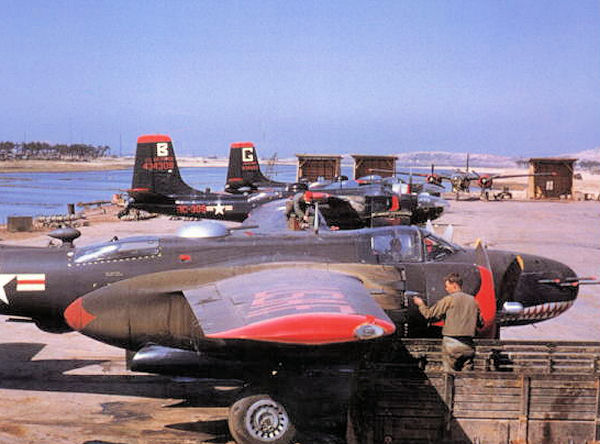
B-26B-50-DL Invaders during the Korean War. Serial 44-34306 identifiable.

One of the immediate needs of the Active Duty Air Force was to assemble a tactical airlift force. In June 1950, the United States could count three troop carrier wings: the Regular Air Force's 314th Troop Carrier Wing at Sewart AFB, Tennessee, and the mobilized 375th and 433d reserve wings at Donaldson AFB, South Carolina.

To fill the airlift void, six Air Force Reserve C-46 Commando wings were identified for mobilization in January 1951. On 28 March 1951, Tactical Air Command activated the Eighteenth Air Force at Donaldson AFB, South Carolina, immediately assigning to it the Reserve 314th and 375th Troop Carrier Wings. As the reserve wings came on active duty, they too joined the Eighteenth Air Force.

The 435th Troop Carrier Wing at Miami IAP, Florida, the 403d Troop Carrier Wing at Portland MAP, Oregon, and the 516th Troop Carrier Wing at Memphis MAP, Tennessee, were mobilized on 1 March 1 April, and 16 April, respectively, while the 434th Troop Carrier Wing at Atterbury AFB Indiana, the 514th Troop Carrier Wing at Mitchel AFB, New York, and the 443d Troop Carrier Wing at Hensley Field, Texas, all came onto active service on 1 May.

==== Eighteenth Air Force ====
Eighteenth Air Force was established and activated in March 1951 to discharge Tactical Air Command's troop carrier responsibilities. With the partial mobilization of the Air Force Reserve during the Korean War, Eighteenth Air Force assumed control of the reserve wings mobilized in 1951-the 435th, 516th, 434th, 514th, and 443d for their active duty tours.

The reservists routinely trained in the troop carrier role, participated in several joint training exercises, and discharged the bulk of Tactical Air Command's troop-carrying responsibilities to other agencies. Among the major joint training exercises in which the units participated were Exercise SOUTHERN PINE in August 1951, Operation SNOWFALL in January–February 1952, and Exercise LONG HORN in March 1952.

For one six-month period of its active duty tour, one of the reserve wings became something of a cold-weather outfit. In April 1952 the United States agreed to construct a weather station for Denmark a few hundred miles from the North Pole, a location inaccessible except by air. Ironically, the southernmost of the reserve wings, the 435th of Miami, drew the assignment to airlift the materials to the north country.

On 14 July 1952, the 375th Troop Carrier Wing was relieved from active military service, and the other five were relieved at various times between 1 December 1952, and 1 February 1953.

==== Reserve individual augmentation ====
The necessity of a partial mobilization in July 1950 raised a number of perplexing problems which became more difficult as the war progressed through its first year. The fundamental problem centered around the fact that the Air Force, requiring a substantial augmentation of reserve manpower in a circumstance no planner had ever envisioned, needed individual replacements and augmentees, not entire organized units.

When the Korean War broke out, the Air Force's immediate need was for individuals to raise active force units to their authorized wartime strengths. National policy required preparedness for a conflict in Europe, and the Air Force hesitated to withdraw manpower from the organized units of the Air Force Reserve and the Air National Guard, the only trained augmentation resource available. Therefore, discounting a handful of volunteers, the Air Force's individual replacements to satisfy the demands of the first phase of the Korean War as well as the expansion requirements came from reserve units by using them as "filler" augmentees along with their equipment and aircraft.

For nearly a month after American troops went into Korea, the Air Force strove to meet burgeoning personnel requirements with volunteers, offering its reservists and guardsmen opportunities for either enlistment or voluntary recall to active duty. The Air Force's first voluntary recall on 30 June 1950, sought communications and electronic officers, radar officers and specialists, telephone and radio operators and maintenance men, cryptographer operators and technicians, and wiremen and cablemen. Additional calls followed, and by 20 July ConAC had a consolidated recall requirement for almost 50,000 reservists. They included 2,000 pilots, 1,900 specialized observers, 4,326 nonrated officers, and 41,536 airmen.

By this time, it was obvious that the need for men could not be satisfied by the voluntary recall which had produced only rated officers. Therefore, by 19 July, President Truman had authorized involuntary recall of reservists for one year. ConAC directed its numbered air forces to select individuals from the Volunteer Air Reserve training program for assignment outside the command. Members of the command's corollary units and its mobilization augmentees and designees could be called up to fill the command's authorized vacancies. The mobilization augmentees of other commands could be recalled to fill any other vacancy in the Air Force. When feasible, corollary unit members were to be used to fill vacancies in their parent units. Members of the Volunteer Air Reserve could be recalled to fill a ConAC vacancy when Organized Air Reserve sources were unavailable, but no member of an organized reserve unit at a flying center was to be individually recalled.

The entry of the Chinese into the war in November 1950, the resultant proclamation of a national emergency, and the accompanying military buildup early in 1951 required the Air Force to turn to its individual reserve resources again. Still desiring to preserve the effectiveness of existing units while rapidly expanding its manpower base, the Air Force needed the reservists to fill critical skill shortages and provide cadre for new units in the expanding force. Even though restricted to the Organized Air Reserve, the involuntary recall of individuals in February and March 1951 was the heaviest of the war. ConAC recalled slightly more than 7,000 reservists in both February and March. About 4,000 were recalled in April, and the number leveled off thereafter at a slightly lower figure.

Fifteen reserve wings were recalled on various dates between 10 March and 1 May and were inactivated at home stations after their personnel had been reassigned, the units being used as "Fillers" for active duty unit personnel and aircraft requirements. The breaking up of the reserve units upon mobilization evoked a flurry of protest from the reservists and from congressmen representing the states in which the units were located. Reserve unit members believed the Air Force had promised that they would serve together upon mobilization-indeed recruiters of the period had at least implied if not actually asserted as much.

In response, the Secretary of the Air Force Thomas K. Finletter, stated that the Chief of Staff had to have absolute flexibility to employ Air Reserve Forces units and individuals in the best interests of national defense. Moreover, he noted that Public Law 599, under whose authority all mobilization during the Korean War took place, specifically authorized the president to order reservists to active duty as individuals or as members of units, with or without their consent.

In the fall of 1951, the Air Force began releasing reservists from active duty.

=== 1950s Reserve Forces Reforms ===
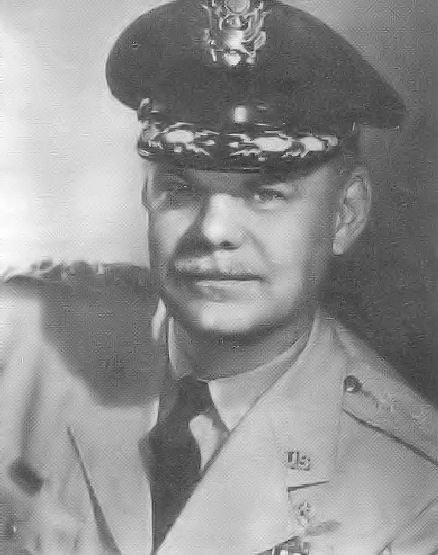
Lieutenant General Leon W. Johnson – Continental Air Command Commander, 1953

Reflecting the attitude of most reservists, by 1951 Congress and the Department of Defense were dissatisfied with the disorder and inequities that had marked the recall of reservists to active military service as a result of the Korean War. Incomplete and outdated records of individual reservists had made administration of the recall difficult. Moreover, unable to call upon younger men who had never served, the nation had to send World War I1 veterans back to war. The Department of Defense requested universal military training legislation to provide the military services with a source of nonveterans.

Thus motivated, Congress passed a series of laws in the first half of the 1950s to strengthen the reserve programs. President Truman approved H.R. 5426 as the Armed Forces Reserve Act of 1952 on 9 July 1952.

In its final form, the new law appeared to most persons and organizations interested in reserve matters, the National Guard Association excepted, as a first concrete step in curing the ills of the national reserve program. It codified many existing laws, regulations, and practices; it gave the combat veteran some protection against being mobilized before others who had not served; and it removed several inequities of treatment of reservists. It was the first legislation ever passed that pertained exclusively to the reserve forces.

At its center, the law established Ready, Standby, and Retired Reserve categories within each reserve component to define liability for call to active duty.

- The Ready Reserve consisted of units or members who were liable for active duty in time of war, in time of national emergency declared by Congress or proclaimed by the president, or when otherwise authorized by law.
- The Standby Reserve consisted of units or members both of the reserve components, other than members in the Retired Reserve, liable for active duty only in time of war or a national emergency declared by Congress or when otherwise authorized by law. Except in time of war, no unit or member of the Standby Reserve could be ordered to active duty unless the appropriate service secretary determined that adequate numbers of the required types of units or individuals of the Ready Reserve were not available.
- Members of the Retired Reserve could be ordered to active duty involuntarily only in time of war or national emergency declared by Congress or when otherwise authorized by law. All other reservists not on the Inactive Status List Retired would be placed in the Ready Reserve.

Influenced by the difficulties being created by the concurrent mobilization, the policies required that each service publish priorities for recall. As military conditions permitted, a reservist ordered to active federal service was to be allowed at least thirty days from the time he was alerted until he had to report for duty.

When units or persons from the reserve forces were ordered to active military service during a partial mobilization, military departments were to assure the continued organization and training of reserve forces not yet mobilized.

=== Post Korea Air Force Reserve ===
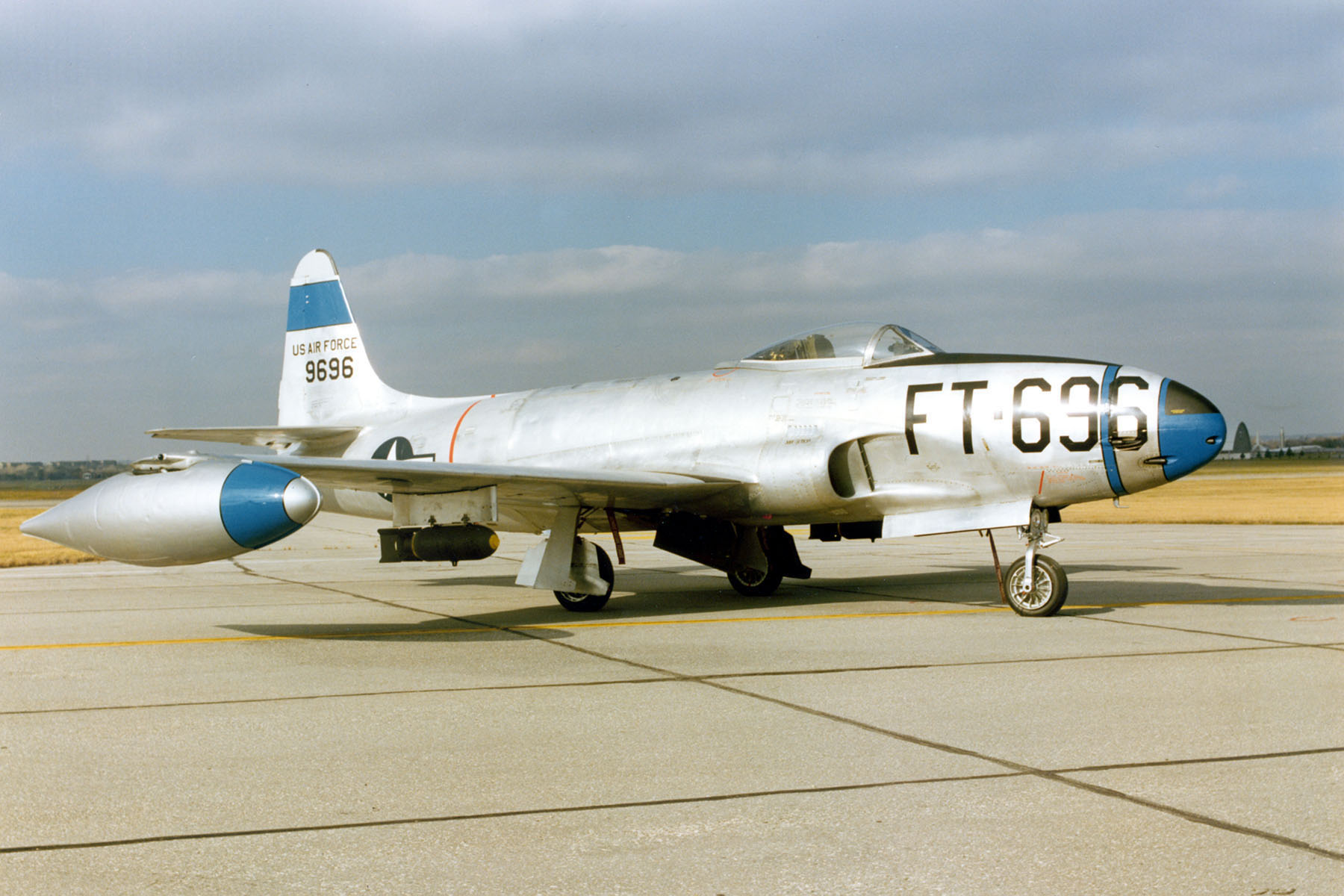
Lockheed F-80C-10-LO Shooting Star 49-696, currently at the National Museum of the United States Air Force

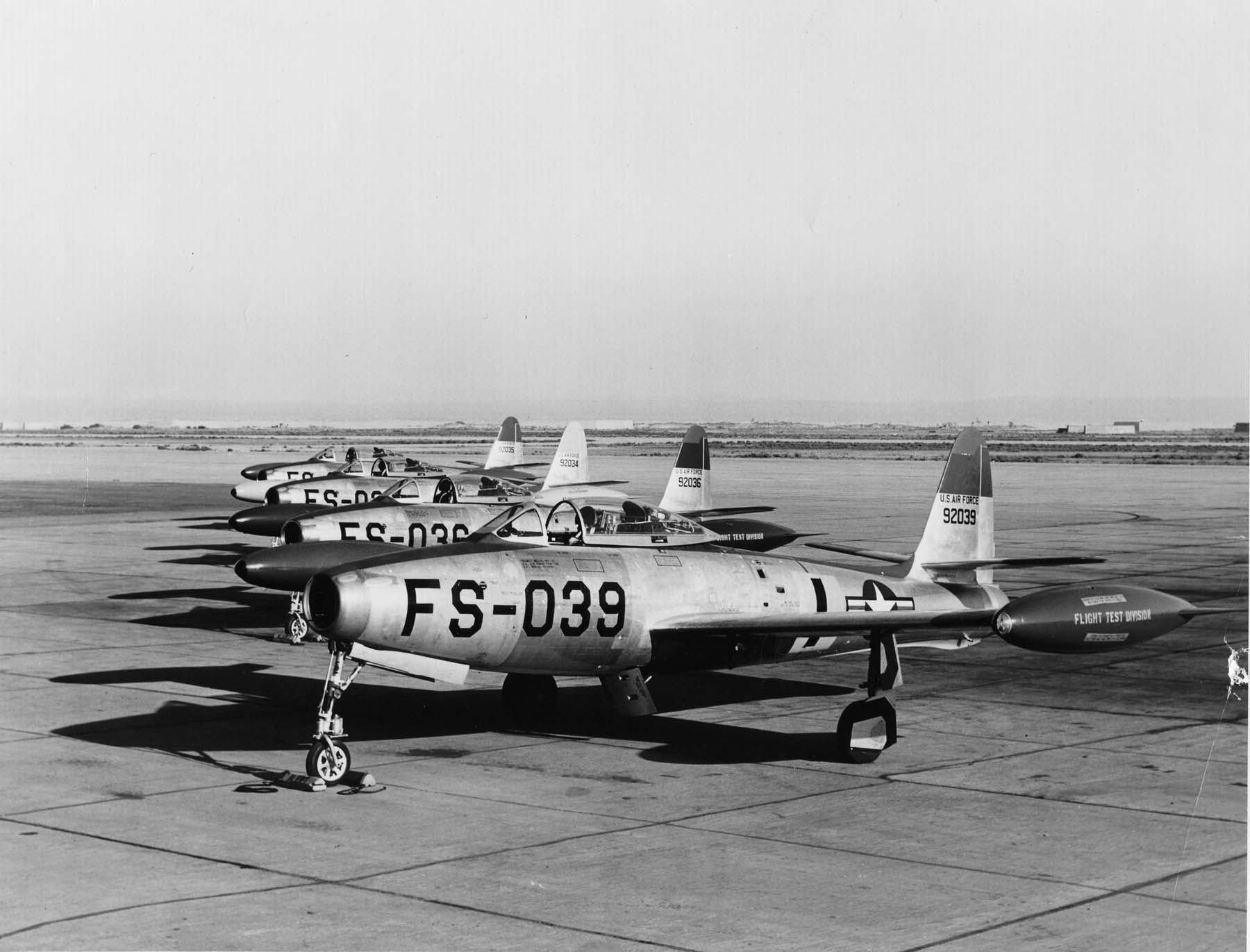
Republic F-84E-1-RE Thunderjets (49-2039 in foreground)

On 4 June 1951, Assistant Secretary of the Air Force Eugene M. Zuckert formed a committee under the chairmanship of the Air Force Reserve's General Smith to examine the Air Reserve programs. General Smith was a reservist who had been associated with the Air Training Command during World War TI, had served on several of the Air Defense Command's early reserve boards, and had been the first chairman of the Air Staff Committee on Reserve. Submitting a long-range plan for the Reserve Forces of the United States Air Force on 27 July. General Smith asserted that its adoption would provide a balanced reserve force by 1958.

The plan provided for 27 Air National Guard and 24 Air Force Reserve tactical wings, 6 Air Force Reserve flying training wings, and almost 1,300 Air Force Reserve nonflying units. This structure would accommodate 250,000 members and provide flying and combat crew training for 38,000 in wing and squadron aircraft. The plan was approved on 9 August. However, due to the recalls caused by Korea, the Air Force Reserve had no aircraft, and none would be available until July 1952. Upon mobilization in 1950 and 1951, Air Force Reserve units remaining intact had kept their aircraft, while aircraft belonging to the mobilized "filler" units had been redistributed.

With the post-Korean War expansion of the Air Force, on 24 November 1954, the Joint Mid-Range War Plan identified a D-Day requirement for fifty-one Air Reserve Forces wings. This was approved on 4 January 1955 by General Nathan Farragut Twining, USAF Chief of Staff. The contemporary Air Force Reserve of today began with General Twining's resultant statement:

It is my desire, therefore, that within budget limits and consistent with the policy of attaining and maintaining maximum combat capability within the 137 wing force, all pertinent Air Staff actions be directed specifically toward: fully equipping Reserve units with aircraft capable of carrying out the D-Day mission; provision of adequate facilities and full unit equipment; and supervision and inspection of training programs with an end toward reaching an acceptable degree of combat capability at the earliest practicable date.

The new mobilization requirement was for twenty-seven Air National Guard and twenty-four Air Force Reserve tactical wings. The latter included nine fighter-bomber, two tactical bombardment, and thirteen troop carrier units.

- The fighter-bomber wings initially would have an air defense role under Air Defense Command and later a tactical fighter role.
- The tactical bombardment and troop carrier wings would be assigned immediately to the Tactical Air Command. As General Twining often pointed out, airlift was one thing the Air Force needed on D-Day, and the thirteen Air Force Reserve wings would certainly add to the force's mobility.

In addition to providing units to augment the active force for limited or full-scale war, by mid- 1955 the Air Force Reserve had a requirement to provide the Air Force with trained individuals in wartime to augment and replace the attrition in the active force. These personnel were to be recruited, matched against specific wartime requirements, and trained in specific skills.

Thus provided with an adequate framework of national policy and Department of Defense guidance, ConAC and the major air commands which would gain the Air Reserve Forces units and individuals upon mobilization began to develop the force into a combat-ready mobilization asset.

==== Air Force Reserve, September 1955 ====
Wing	Assignment	Activated	Location	Aircraft	Comments
94th Tactical Reconnaissance Wing; 94th Bombardment Wing, Tactical	First Air Force	26 May 1952	Dobbins AFB, Georgia; Scott AFB, Illinois	RB/B-26 Invader	Re-designated a TBW 18 May 1955, moved to Scott AFB same date. Re-designated: 94th TCW on 1 July 1957
452d Tactical Reconnaissance Wing; 452d Bombardment Wing, Tactical	Fourth Air Force	6 June 1952	Long Beach Airport, California	RB/B-26 Invader	Re-designated a TBW 22 May 1955 Re-designated: 452d TCW on 1 July 1957
89th Fighter-Bomber Wing	First Air Force	14 Jun 1952	Hanscom Field, Massachusetts	F-80C Shooting Star; F-84E Thunderjet	Inactivated 16 November 1957
319th Fighter-Bomber Wing	Fourteenth Air Force	18 May 1955	Memphis IAP, Tennessee	F-80C Shooting Star; F-84E Thunderjet	Inactivated 16 November 1957
349th Fighter-Bomber Wing	Fourth Air Force	13 June 1952	Hamilton AFB, California	F-80C Shooting Star; F-84E Thunderjet	Re-designated 349th TCW on 1 September 1957
438th Fighter-Bomber Wing	Tenth Air Force	15 June 1952	Billy Mitchell Field, Wisconsin	F-80C Shooting Star; F-84E Thunderjet	Inactivated 16 November 1957
439th Fighter-Bomber Wing	Tenth Air Force	15 June 1952	Selfridge AFB, Michigan	F-80C Shooting Star; F-84E Thunderjet	Inactivated 16 November 1957
440th Fighter-Bomber Wing	Tenth Air Force	15 June 1952	Minneapolis-St Paul IAP, Minnesota	F-80C Shooting Star; F-84E Thunderjet	Re-designated 440th TCW on 8 September 1957
445th Fighter-Bomber Wing	First Air Force	24 June 1952	Niagara Falls MAP, New York	F-80C Shooting Star; F-84E Thunderjet	Re-designated 445th TCW on 6 September 1957
448th Fighter-Bomber Wing	Fourteenth Air Force	12 April 1955	NAS Dallas/Hensley Field, Texas	F-80C Shooting Star; F-84E Thunderjet	Inactivated 16 November 1957
482d Fighter-Bomber Wing	Fourteenth Air Force	18 May 1955	Dobbins AFB, Georgia	F-80C Shooting Star; F-84E Thunderjet	Inactivated 16 November 1957
302d Troop Carrier Wing	First Air Force	14 June 1952	Clinton County AFB, Ohio	C-46 Commando	
375th Troop Carrier Wing	First Air Force	14 July 1952	Greater Pittsburgh Airport, Pennsylvania	C-46 Commando	
403d Troop Carrier Wing	Fourth Air Force	1 January 1953	Portland IAP, Oregon	C-46 Commando	
433d Troop Carrier Wing	Fourteenth Air Force	18 May 1955	Brooks AFB, Texas	C-46 Commando	
434th Troop Carrier Wing	Tenth Air Force	1 February 1953	Bakalar AFB, Indiana	C-46 Commando	
434th Troop Carrier Wing	Fourteenth Air Force	1 December 1952	Miami IAP, Florida	C-46 Commando	
436th Troop Carrier Wing	First Air Force	18 May 1955	NAS Floyd Bennett Field, New York	C-46 Commando	Inactivated 15 May 1958
437th Troop Carrier Wing	Tenth Air Force	15 June 1952	O’Hare IAP, Illinois	C-46 Commando	Inactivated 16 November 1957
442d Troop Carrier Wing	Tenth Air Force	15 June 1952	Grandview AFB, Missouri	C-46 Commando	
446th Troop Carrier Wing	Fourteenth Air Force	25 May 1955	Ellington AFB, Texas	C-46 Commando	
459th Troop Carrier Wing	First Air Force	26 January 1955	Andrews AFB, Maryland	C-46 Commando	
512th Troop Carrier Wing	First Air Force	14 June 1952	New Castle County Airport, Delaware	C-46 Commando	
514th Troop Carrier Wing	First Air Force	1 April 1953	Mitchel AFB, New York	C-119 Flying Boxcar	

For the first time, the Air Force Reserve possessed no trainer aircraft, and the units did all their flying in tactical aircraft: B-26 Invader, F-80 Shooting Star, F-84 Thunderjet, C-46 Commando, and C-119 Flying Boxcar. Fighter-Bomber Wings were aligned to Air Defense Command. Tactical Bombardment and Troop Carrier Wings were aligned to Tactical Air Command.

==== Additional expansion in the 1950s ====
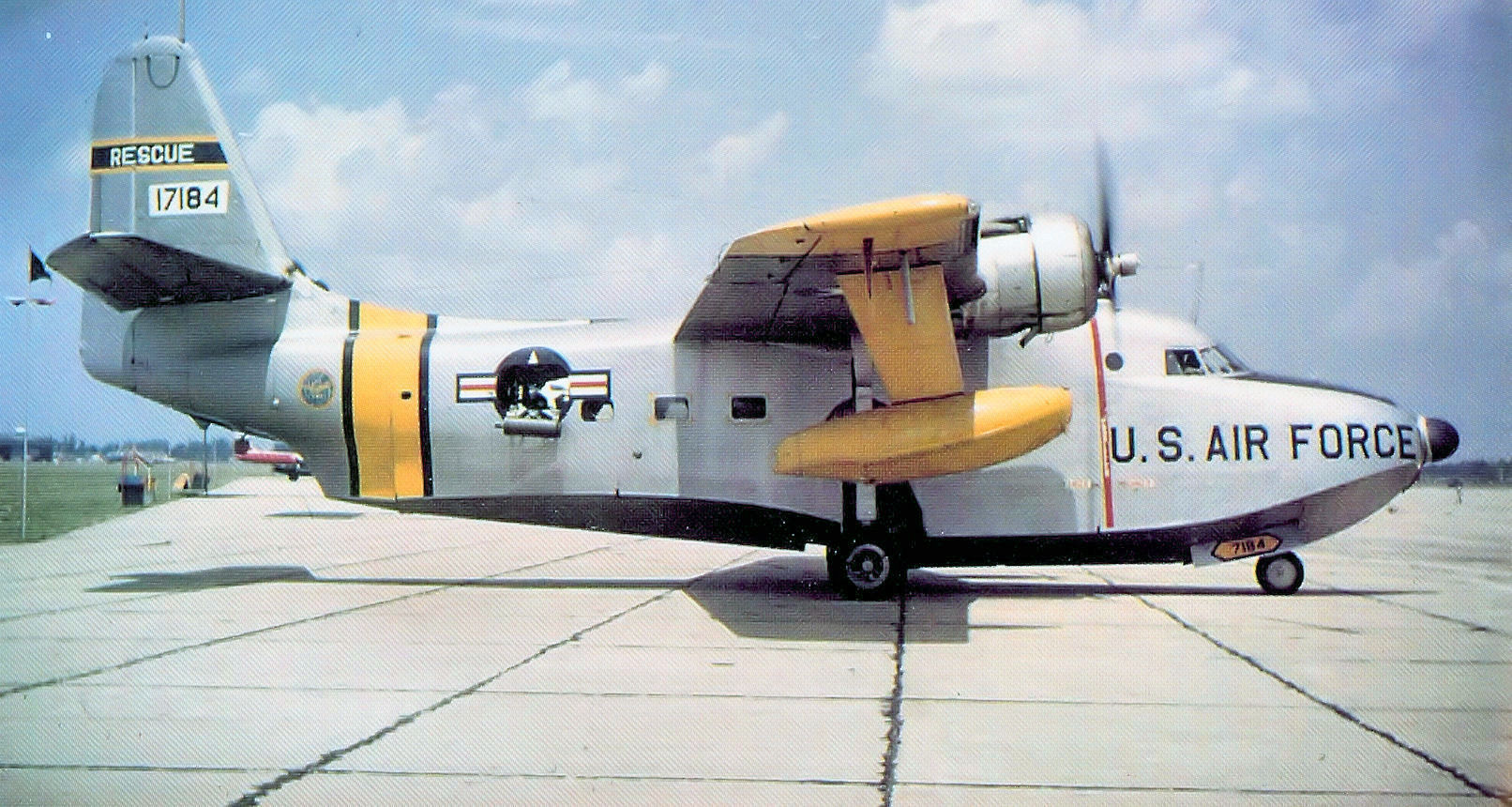
Grumman SA-16B Albatross 51-7255

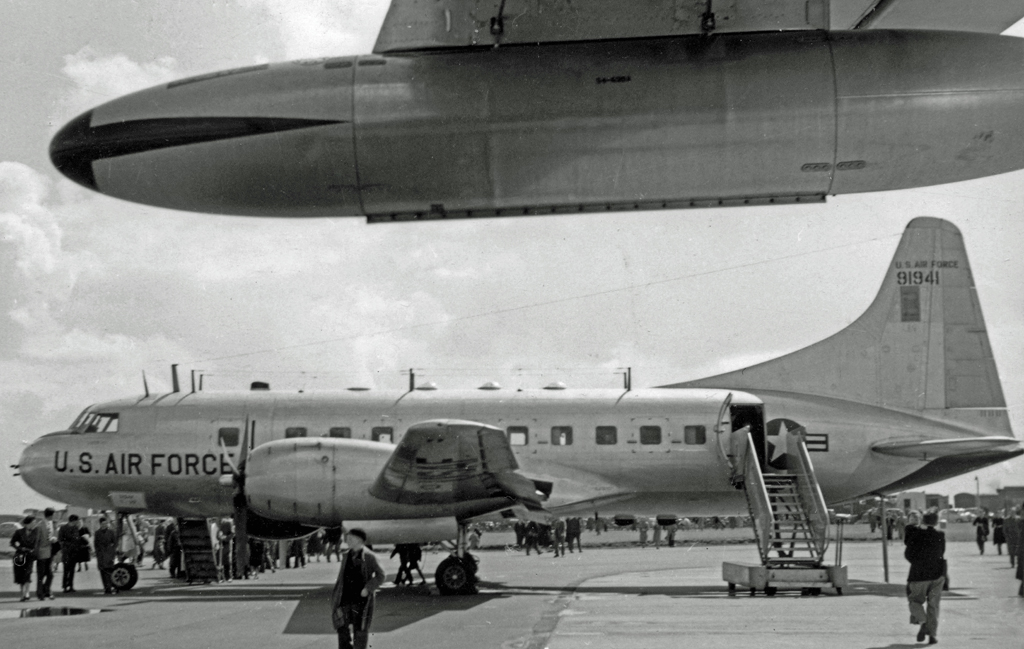
Convair T-29 Navigational trainer 49-1941

Beginning in 1956 the Air Force Reserve flying unit program expanded to include air rescue squadrons equipped with the fixed-wing amphibious Grumman HU-16 Albatross aircraft. ConAC activated the following squadrons between 1956 and 1958.

- 301st Air Rescue Squadron, Miami International Airport, Florida
- 302d Air Rescue Squadron, Williams AFB, Arizona
- 303d Air Rescue Squadron, Long Beach Municipal Airport, California
- 304th Air Rescue Squadron, Portland International Airport, Oregon
- 305th Air Rescue Squadron, Selfridge AFB, Michigan

The 301st Air Rescue Squadron at Miami conducted the first reserve rescue in January 1957, recovering three airmen from the sea when two B-47 Stratojets collided off the coast of Cuba.

The Air Force Reserve's aircrew training activities expanded when Headquarters USAF identified a requirement to train navigators to meet not only the Air Force's day-to-day needs, but also those of the Civil Reserve Air Fleet. Starting in January 1955, a ConAC program offered refresher and continuation academic and flying training to the navigators. As enrollment in the program reached 5,000 annually, ConAC established navigator replacement training squadrons at the site of each Air Force Reserve wing. Reservists took their monthly inactive duty training at these sites. The program initially employed TC-45 Expeditor and TC-47 Skytrain aircraft until T-29 Flying Classrooms became available.

The Air Force Reserve unit program had never been restricted to flying units, and in the mid-1950s nonflying support units proliferated. July 1956 saw nine aerial port operations squadrons in existence. ConAC activated thirteen air terminal squadrons in October 1956 and organized ten Air Force hospitals in April 1957.

==== Activities and Exercises ====
Continental Air Command was responsible to conduct the active duty as well as the inactive duty training of the Air Reserve Forces units. Nevertheless, the gaining commands furnished the tactical doctrine and operating procedures and assistance in preparing training objectives and plans. Active duty training objectives that guided the summer training of the Air Force Reserve wings in 1955, 1956, and 1957 reflected the desires of the gaining commands.

Tactical Air Command wanted troop carrier units capable of participating in mass maneuvers and joint exercises involving two or more troop carrier wings in support of other Air Force and Army units.

As the Air Force Reserve troop carrier units acquired proficiency, they began to participate in the relief of domestic emergencies. In August 1955, reserve aircrews delivered chlorinated lime to New England for purifying the drinking water after an outbreak of typhoid fever, and in October reservists delivered tons of food and clothing to flood-stricken Tampico, Mexico, in the aftermath of Hurricane Janice.

In the summer of 1956 when it conducted an independent major airlift. In Operation SIXTEEN TON twelve Air Force Reserve troop carrier wings used their annual active duty training time to move U.S. Coast Guard equipment to the Caribbean. The reserve crews flew 164 missions on which they transported 856,715 pounds of cargo. No significant delays were experienced except for four days lost due to Hurricane Betsy, and no flying safety incidents were incurred.

During April 1957, Operation SWIFT LIFT reserve troop carrier units used inactive duty training periods to airlift personnel and cargo for the Tactical Air Command. Each Air Force Reserve troop carrier squadron provided one aircraft with crew in continuous support of the requirement. In addition to providing training for the reserve crews, SWIFT LIFT moved considerable high-priority cargo for the Air Force, saving significant amounts in transportation and procurement dollars.

In the summer of 1958, reserve units initiated Operation READY SWAP, an open-ended airlift in which they transported aircraft engines between Air Materiel Command depots.

In August 1954, the 514th Troop Carrier Wing C-119 Flying Boxcars dropped troops during a joint maneuver with the 82d Airborne Division at Fort Bragg, North Carolina, in the first reserve paradrop during a joint Army/Air Force exercise. Then, at the suggestion of the Tactical Air Command, five of the Air Force Reserve troop carrier wings culminated their 1956 active duty training by participating in the joint exercise Operation PINE CONE. This was the first large-scale exercise to combine Air Force Reserve and active forces.

Air Defense Command required fighter-bomber wings capable of supporting augmented tactical squadrons operating independently of the parent wing after mobilization and tactical squadrons capable of performing continuous air defense operations for indefinite periods. The command would also have to refine its interceptor techniques and perform realistic interceptor exercises.

On 1 July 1956, the 319th Fighter-Bomber Wing at Memphis Municipal Airport began standing F-84E runway alert under operational control of the 20th Air Division, joining Air National Guard units as part of the Air Defense Command's defense network.

==== Detached Squadron Concept ====
During the first half of 1955, the Air Force began detaching Air Force Reserve squadrons from their parent wing locations to separate sites. The concept offered several advantages: communities were more likely to accept the smaller squadrons than the large wings; separate squadron operations would ensure the training of the squadron as the basic Air Force unit, without the confusion of group and wing being superimposed upon squadrons; and the location of separate squadrons in smaller population centers would facilitate recruiting and manning.

Most Continental Air Command Reserve wings controlled two or three squadrons of aircraft. ConAC began transferring individual squadrons to installations located throughout the United States. Initially, the command detached troop carrier squadrons from Andrews AFB, Maryland, to Byrd Field, Virginia; from Portland IAP, Oregon, to Paine AFB, Washington; and from Miami IAP to Orlando AFB, Florida. In time, the detached squadron program proved successful in attracting additional participants to the Air Force Reserve and producing combat-ready units.

==== 1957 Realignment and Budget Reductions ====
By August 1957, the Defense Department had instructed the Air Force to reduce its fiscal 1958 budget to $17.9 billion, nearly a billion less than the service had requested in April. ConAC's 24 Air Reserve wings never had their 72 authorized squadrons. In July 1957, they comprised 55 tactical squadrons and another 17 to be activated at detached locations within the next 4 years. In face of reduced budgets, the Defense Department guidance made it perfectly clear they would never be available, and the Air Reserve Forces combined force of 96 units would be reduced.

The Secretary of the Air Force approved the 1957–1961 reserve flying wing program on 20 September 1957. The World War II-era B-26 Invader and C-46 Commando aircraft would be retired. The flying program would consist of 15 troop carrier wings comprising 45 squadrons, all equipped with C-119 Flying Boxcars received from active duty units, and 5 air rescue squadrons equipped with SA-16s. At the end of fiscal year 1959, the Air Force Reserve flying force consisted of forty-five troop carrier and five air rescue squadrons.

Air Defense Command concluded that the number of Air Reserve Forces fighter-bomber units then at hand greatly exceeded the commands' requirements for air defense augmentation. It was recommended that the entire Air Reserve Forces air defense fighter program be given to the Air National Guard and the troop carrier program, to the Air Force Reserve. The Air Force Reserve program had evolved into a concept and form that would carry it through the next ten years.

=== Berlin and Cuban Missile Crisis ===
Several major re-organizations occurred in Continental Air Command in the early 1960s. The first occurred on 1 September 1960 with the establishment of Air Reserve Regions to replace the Numbered Air Forces. The Reserve Regions were geographically based, each with a regional commander in control of units within its zone of operations.

==== 1961 Berlin Crisis ====
World War II had left the city of Berlin 100 miles deep within East German territory, controlled by the Soviet Union, and divided into Soviet, British, French, and United States zones of occupation, administered under local agreements which did not guarantee Western access to the city. Responding to a series of Soviet actions in 1948, the three western allies consolidated their zones and formed the city of West Berlin. For fifteen years the western powers maintained a tenacious hold on West Berlin under periodic harassment of the Soviets.

On 6 January 1961 Soviet Premier Nikita Khrushchev vowed to "eradicate the splinter from the heart of Europe", but he also agreed to meet the new U.S. president, John F. Kennedy in Vienna, Austria, in June, implying that he would take no action on the status of Berlin until after their meeting. The June meeting between president Kennedy and Premier Khrushchev did not go well and intensified the tension over West Berlin. On 25 July, President Kennedy went to the nation with his program on the Berlin crisis. He told the people that the U.S. right to be in West Berlin and its commitment to the city had to be defended if the Soviets attempted to curtail them unilaterally. Among other actions announced, Kennedy stated that he initially intended to recall a number of Air Force Reserve air transport squadrons and Air National Guard tactical fighter squadrons, but that he would call others if needed. Congress gave the president the requested powers on 1 August 1961, authorizing him to order reserve units and individual reservists involuntarily to active duty for not more than twelve consecutive months.

Shortly thereafter, the crisis in West Berlin escalated. Despite legal and psychological obstacles, thousands of East Berliners were streaming daily into West Berlin, seeking freedom in the West and, in the process, draining the depressed economy of East Germany. The communists responded on 13 August by sealing off the border between East and West Berlin, first with a fence and then with a concrete wall topped with barbed wire. Buildings along the border were also incorporated into the barrier by closing their apertures with bricks.

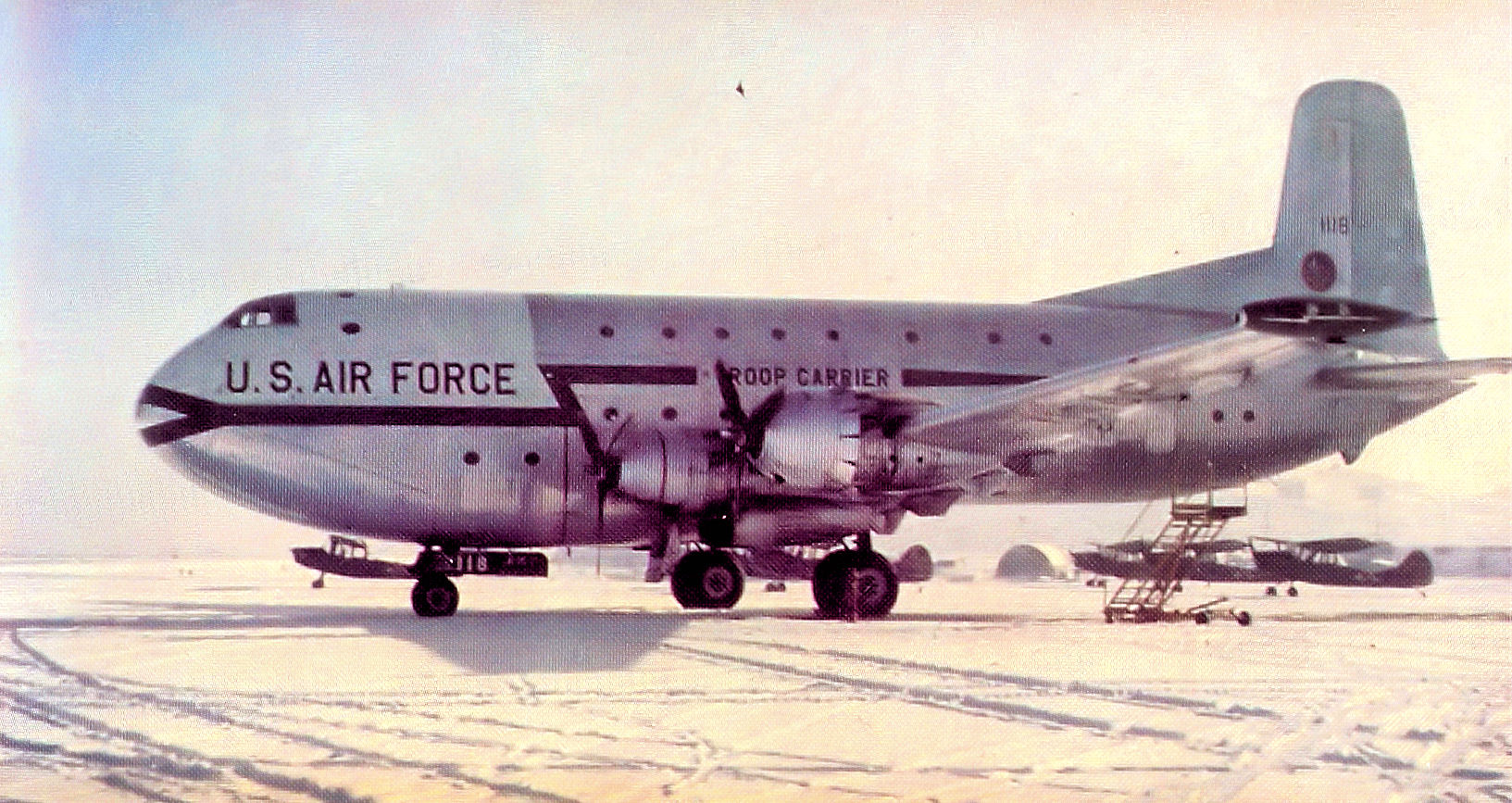
C-124 Globemaster II

On 25 August with the Wall acquiring greater permanence as each day passed and amid rumors that the Soviets were about to resume atmospheric testing of nuclear weapons which had been halted in 1958, President Kennedy approved Defense Department plans to order Army, Navy, and Air Force Reserve and National Guard units to active duty with 76,542 men. These included five Air Force Reserve C-124 Globemaster II squadrons. On 1 October 1961, as their gaining command, the Tactical Air Command mobilized the C-124 units, which had been alerted on 1 September and the Air Reserve Records Center recalled 2,666 filler personnel for the mobilized Reserve and Guard units. In all, 5,613 Air Force Reservists came on extended active duty for the Berlin Crisis.

Of all the Air Force Reserve troop carrier units, the five groups activated and assigned to the mobilized 435th and the 442d Troop Carrier Wings were the least prepared for active duty because they had just begun converting from C-119s to C-124s. The Air Force Reserve 77th Troop Carrier Squadron received its first C-124A at Donaldson AFB, South Carolina, about the time that president Kennedy took office in January 1961. Its five C-124 squadrons were organized on 8 May not a month before the president's meeting with Khrushchev in Vienna. Whether the units were ready or not, the president needed C-124 troop carrier units for the transatlantic movement of personnel and equipment to Europe for NATO reinforcement if necessary, and the reserve units were the only available augmentation.

The 442d Troop Carrier Wing, attained combat readiness on 1 March 1962. Thereafter, the wing participated in a wide variety of missions and exercises directed by the Tactical Air Command, and it conducted extensive overwater training on flights to Hawaii, Newfoundland, Bermuda, and the Azores.

The 435th Troop Carrier Wing became combat-ready in January 1962. Its crews flew missions that took them to England, South America, Iceland, California, and points between.

In December 1961, President Kennedy wanted to return all the recalled reservists to inactive status as soon as possible without having to call up others to replace them. At the same time, he thought it advisable to maintain the strength of the US. Army in Europe at essentially the existing level for some time to come. He also wanted to maintain strong Army forces in strategic reserve in the United States ready to deploy to Europe or any other threatened area. The Air Force released the 435th and 442d Troop Carrier Wings from active military service on 27 August 1962. President Kennedy, who had so urgently needed their numbers and presence a year earlier saluted them:

On your return to civilian life, I wish to convey my personal appreciation for the contribution that you have made to the defense of this Nation during the past year. I am keenly aware that your active duty has involved inconvenience and hardships for many individuals and families. For the fortitude with which these difficulties have been borne, I am deeply grateful.

Although not recalled to extended active duty, about one hundred reservists from the Air Force Reserve's five Aerospace Rescue and Recovery Squadrons voluntarily came on active duty to provide rescue coverage for deployment of the jet fighters from the mobilized Air National Guard units to Europe. Four crews and SA-16 aircraft were stationed at Goose AFB, Labrador, and four at Prestwick Airport, Scotland, to reinforce coverage of the northern route; additionally, two crews deployed with their aircraft to Eglin AFB, Florida, to provide against the contingency that bad weather might necessitate a southerly crossing.

==== 1962 Cuban Missile Crisis ====
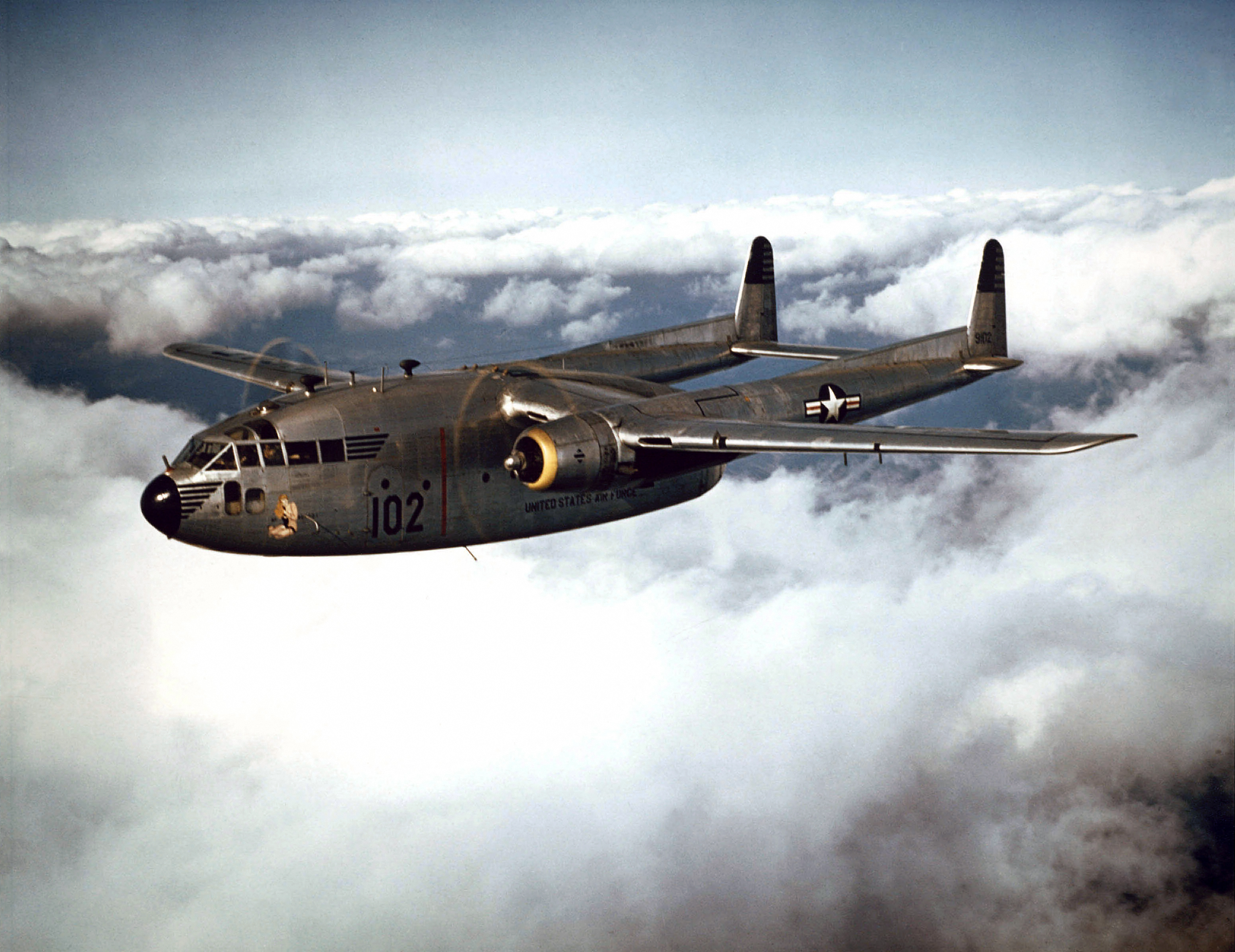
C-119 "Flying Boxcar"

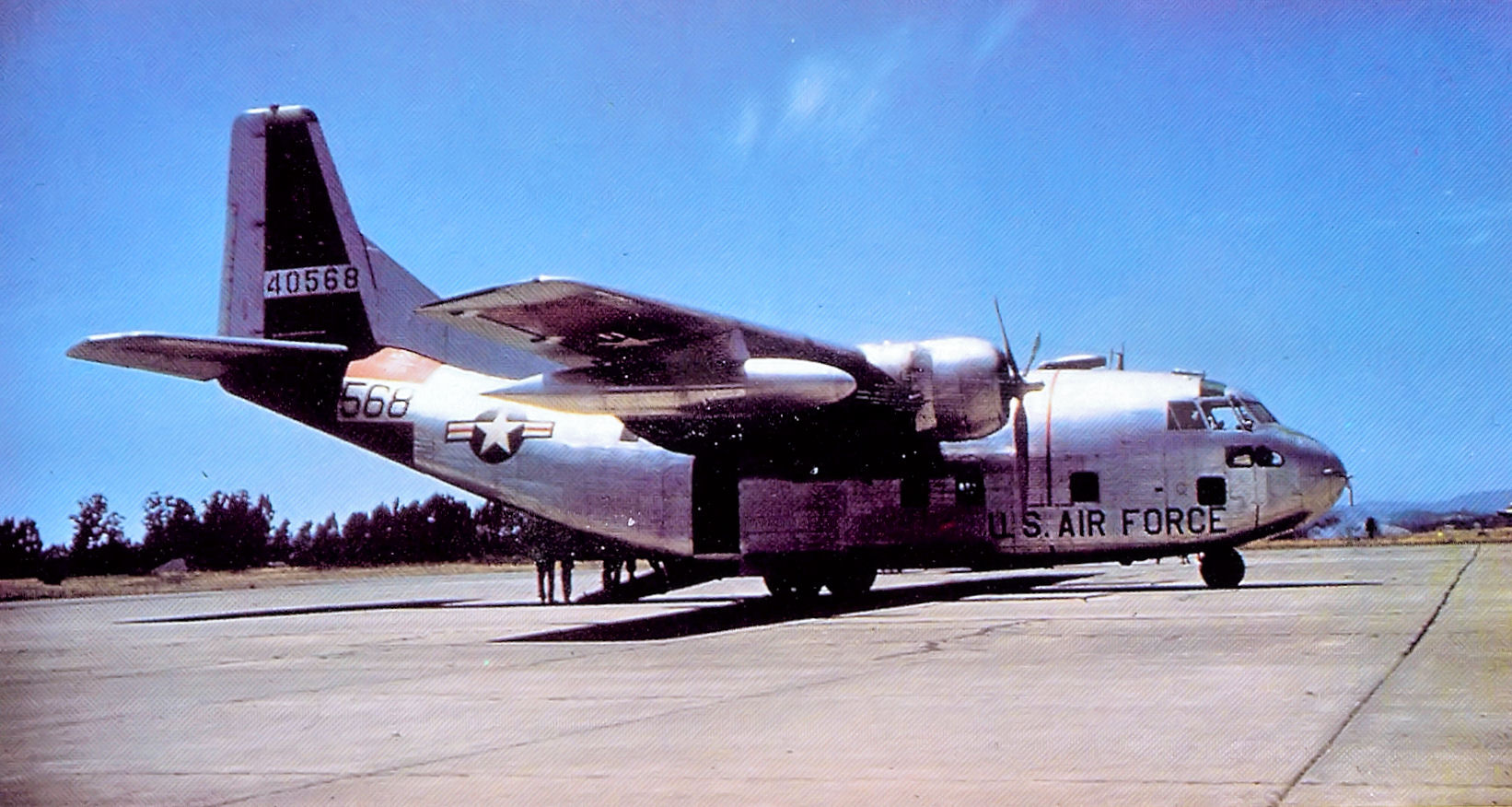
Fairchild C-123B Provider

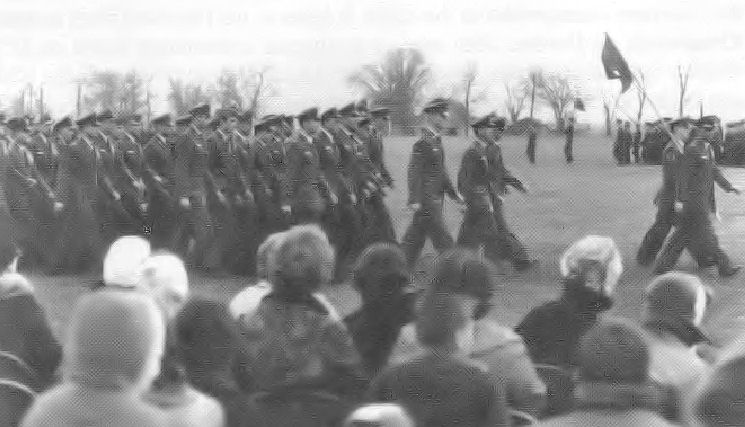
Mobilized 434th Troop Carrier Wing passes in review prior to being mustered from active service at Bakalar AFB, Indiana, on 27 November 1962, following the Cuban missile crisis.

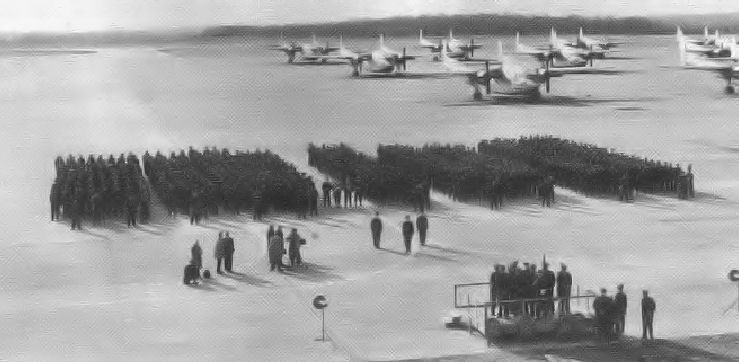
The 512th Troop Carrier Wing musters on 29 November 1962, at Willow Grove NAS, Pennsylvania, to demobilize following the Cuban missile crisis.

By 22 August 1962, when the Air Force released the reservists it had mobilized in October 1961, a second crisis had arisen to involve other Air Force Reserve units. The focus of the new problem was Cuba, where a revolution had installed Fidel Castro as president in 1959. The Castro government soon placed itself in the communist group of nations, pursued a social economic agenda and allied itself with the Soviet Union. Relations between the new republic and the United States deteriorated due to Cuba "nationalizing" United States and foreign-owned businesses and seizing the property without compensation to the owners. On 3 January 1961, President Dwight D. Eisenhower broke off diplomatic relations with the Castro government of Cuba, protesting against "a long series of harassments, baseless accusations, and vilification". On the night of 17 April, a force of about 1,500 Cuban exiles supported by the United States landed at the Bay of Pigs on the southern coast of Cuba in the fruitless expectation of inspiring an uprising against Castro.

On 1 September 1962, the Soviet Union announced a new treaty of friendship with Cuba under which the island country was to receive Soviet arms and technicians "to resist the imperialists' 'threats". With a large segment of the U.S. press and many congressmen urging the administration to act, President John F. Kennedy accepted renewed standby mobilization authority from Congress. The second joint resolution within fourteen months authorized the president to mobilize any unit or member of the Ready Reserve for no more than twelve consecutive months. The resolution gave the administration the same options as the 1961 resolution had to strengthen the active forces by extending tours of duty.

Headquarters Continental Air Command and its reserve troop carrier wings became involved in the Cuban crisis at 17:42 12 October, a typical Friday, about an hour after the headquarters' quitting time. Headquarters Tactical Air Command needed Air Force Reserve help to airlift cargo from as yet undetermined points all over the United States. The operation was to begin the next morning, when specific requirements and destinations would be furnished, and it would be completed by Monday, 15 October. Talking around a classified subject over an open telephone line restricted the flow of information, but, assured by Headquarters TAC that the mission was valid and vital, Lieutenant Colonel W. L. Spencer, Chief of the ConAC Current Operations Division, committed the Air Force Reserve troop carrier force.

In the end, 80 C-119 Flying Boxcar aircraft flew 1,232 hours that weekend carrying materiel from across the United States into Key West Naval Air Station and Homestead AFB, Florida. The buildup of military forces in the southeast United States had begun. Much of the buildup was carried out in secret under the cover of PHIBRIGLE6X2, a major amphibious exercise conducted in the Southeast United States and Caribbean. The exercise obscured the initial military preparations related to the Cuban crisis.

On 16 October, President Kennedy reviewed aerial photographs showing that the Soviet Union was installing offensive Intermediate-range ballistic missiles in Cuba. Ordering daily reconnaissance flights over the island, President Kennedy and his advisers met regularly to consider military options while he mustered diplomatic support around the world. On the evening of 22 October, Kennedy went on television explaining to the nation and the world that U.S. policy demanded the withdrawal of the missiles, the president declared that he would quarantine all offensive military equipment under shipment to Cuba. He directed the armed services to be prepared for any eventuality and reinforced the United States Guantanamo Bay Naval Base on the southern tip of Cuba.

Air Force Reserve airlift support of the Tactical Air Command continued at an exceptionally high rate. ConAC increased its normal daily aircraft support to TAC from ten to twenty-five. Between 20 and 28 October, Air Force Reserve C-l19s, C-l23s, and C-124s delivered cargo and military personnel into the southeast and flew priority missions for Air Force Logistics Command, Air Force Systems Command, and Air Defense Command. Having watched the president's telecast the night before, reserve troop carrier wing officials were not surprised on 16:00 23 October when Headquarters ConAC directed them to activate their command posts and operate them around the clock, seven days a week. The command posts did not have to be elaborate, but someone had to be on duty at all times who was in immediate contact with key personnel of the wing.

On 27 October the Soviet Union said it would remove its missiles from Cuba and offer a nonaggression pledge to Turkey if the United States would remove its PGM-19 Jupiter IRBM missiles from Turkey and offer a nonaggression pledge to Cuba. With invasion plans for Cuba already in the final planning stages, Secretary of Defense Robert McNamara stated at the White House Executive Committee that additional reserve units were necessary to meet invasion plans and that it would also put some pressure on the Soviets. President Kennedy approved McNamara's recommendation to mobilize 24 Air Force Reserve troop carrier squadrons-about 14,000 reservists and 300 planes.

This was the flashpoint of the crisis. At the White House, President Kennedy ordered the twenty-four troop carrier squadrons of the Air Force Reserve to active duty. They would be necessary for an invasion of the island, which was in advanced planning stages. Kennedy had not abandoned hope, but what hope there was now rested with Khrushchev's revising his course within the next few hours. The official recall message came in from Headquarters USAF at 02:23 28 October. The message ordered one C-123 Provider and seven C-119 Flying Boxcar troop carrier wings along with six aerial port squadrons to extended active duty at 09:00 28 October 1962 for no more than twelve consecutive months. The mobilized Air Force Reserve units brought 14,220 people and 422 aircraft on active duty on 28 October.

About the time the mobilized troop carrier wings came on active military service at 0900 the White House received a new message from Premier Khrushchev. Conciliatory in tone and accepting president Kennedy's terms, it promised removal of the missiles and verification of the fact by the United Nations. Although this definitely relieved the crisis, the president decided that United States ships would stay on station in the "Quarantine Zone" and that the recalled Air Force Reserve units would remain on active duty pending satisfactory United Nations arrangements. Not until 20 November, therefore, did president Kennedy announce that he was lifting the quarantine and that the mobilized air reserve units would be released before Christmas. On 22 November the Air Force directed TAC to release the reserve units at midnight, 28 November. Some personnel voluntarily remained on active duty an additional 30 days, and the last individual reservists were relieved from active service on 29 December.

The mobilization of Air Force Reserve troop carrier units played a part in persuading Premier Khrushchev that the United States was serious about getting those missiles out of Cuba. A London Times editorial of 23 December, declared:

Looking back over that fateful week, some officials are disposed to believe that the mobilization of 24 troop carrying squadrons finally persuaded Mr. Khrushchev that war would be inevitable if the missiles were not withdrawn

The Air Force Reserve did absolutely all that was asked of it between 13 October and 29 December 1962. It augmented the active force in assembling materiel in the southeastern comer of the country. When the President thought he might need an invasion force and the Department of Defense mobilized Air Force Reserve troop carrier units as essential to the task, they responded quickly and were prepared to do their part. Then, individual crew members stayed on to help redeploy the assembled force. Seven C-119 Flying Boxcar Troop Carrier Wings (944th, 302d, 349th, 403d, 434th, 440th and 512th), consisting of 20 squadrons were activated, and the 445th Troop Carrier Wing of three C-123 Provider assault squadrons were activated during the crisis.

=== 1963 Reserve Wing Reorganization ===
The original Table of Organization for each Wing was a wing headquarters, a troop carrier group, an Air Base Group, a maintenance and supply group, and a medical group. In 1957, the troop carrier group and maintenance and supply groups were inactivated, with their squadrons reassigned directly to the wing headquarters – despite the fact that many wings had squadrons spread out over several bases due to the Detached Squadron Concept dispersing Reserve units over centers of population. Following the mobilizations in 1961 and 1962 for the Berlin Crisis and the Cuban Missile Crisis, Continental Air Command realized that it was unwieldy to mobilize an entire wing unless absolutely necessary.

To resolve this, in late 1962 and early 1963, ConAC reorganized the structure of its reserve Troop Carrier Wings by establishing fully deployable Troop Carrier Groups and inserting them into the chain of command between the Wing and its squadrons at every base that held a ConAC troop carrier squadron. At each base, the group was composed of a material squadron, a troop carrier squadron, a tactical hospital or dispensary, and a combat support squadron. Each troop carrier wing consisted of 3 or 4 of these groups. By doing so, ConAC could facilitate the mobilization of either aircraft and aircrews alone, aircraft and minimum support personnel (one troop carrier group), or the entire troop carrier wing. This also gave ConAC the flexibility to expand each Wing by attaching additional squadrons, if necessary from other Reserve wings to the deployable groups for deployments. Some bases consisted of two or possibly three groups due to the fact that additional bases for these groups had not been located, so they were co-located on a single base until in the future a separate base could be obtained by ConAC.

These troop carrier groups have been re-designated several times since their establishment with changes in missions and aircraft (the Air Force Reserve Command now operates several different types of aircraft, not all of which are transports). Many of these units still exist and today are designated as Wings.

Wing/Location	Assignment	Groups	Squadrons	Locations	Aircraft	Comments
94th Troop Carrier Wing; Hanscom AFB MA	First Air Force Reserve Region	901st TCG; 902d TCG	731st TCS; 732d TCS	Hanscom AFB MA; Grenier AFB NH	C-119 Flying Boxcar; C-124 Globemaster II	Ordered to Active Service during Cuban Missile Crisis, 28 October-28 November 1962; 902d TCG inactivated in January 1966 with the closure of Grenier AFB; converted to C-124s in 1966
302d Troop Carrier Wing; Clinton County AFB, OH	Second Air Force Reserve Region	906th TCG; 907th TCG; 908th TCG	355th TCS; 356th TCS; 357th TCS	Clinton County AFB OH; Clinton County AFB OH; Clinton County AFB OH	C-119 Flying Boxcar; C-123 Provider	908th TCG transferred to 435th TCW, 18 March 1963; Ordered to Active Service during Cuban Missile Crisis, 28 October-28 November 1962
349th Troop Carrier Wing; Hamilton AFB, CA	Fourth Air Force Reserve Region	938th TCG; 939th TCG; 940th TCG; 941st TCG	312th TCS; 313th TCS; 314th TCG; 97th TCS	Hamilton AFB CA; Portland IAP OR; McClellan AFB CA; Paine AFB WA	C-119 Flying Boxcar; C-124 Globemaster II	Ordered to Active Service during Cuban Missile Crisis, 28 October-28 November 1962; converted to C-124s in 1966
403d Troop Carrier Wing; Selfridge AFB, MI	Fifth Air Force Reserve Region	927th TCG; 928th TCG; 929th TCG	63d TCS; 64th TCS; 65th TCS	Selfridge AFB MI; O'Hare IAP IL; Davis Field OK	C-119 Flying Boxcar	Ordered to Active Service during Cuban Missile Crisis, 28 October-28 November 1962. 929th TCG inactivated in July 1966 with the closure of Davis Field.
433d Troop Carrier Wing; Kelly AFB TX	Fourth Air Force Reserve Region	921st TCG; 922d TCG; 923d TCG	67th TCS; 68th TCS; 69th TCS	Kelly AFB TX; Kelly AFB TX; Carswell AFB TX	C-119 Flying Boxcar	923d TCG inactivated in November 1965 due to realignment of units at Carswell AFB..
434th Troop Carrier Wing; Atterbury AFB IN	Fifth Air Force Reserve Region	930th TCG; 931st TCG; 932d TCG	71st TCS; 72d TCS; 73d TCS	Atterbury AFB IN; Bakalar AFB IN; Scott AFB IL	C-119 Flying Boxcar	Ordered to Active Service during Cuban Missile Crisis, 28 October-28 November 1962
435th Troop Carrier Wing; Homestead AFB FL	Third Air Force Reserve Region	908th TCG; 915th TCG; 916th TCG; 917th TCG	357th TCS; 76th TCS; 77th TCS; 78th TCS	Bates Field AL; Homestead AFB FL; Donaldson AFB SC; Barksdale AFB LA	C-119 Flying Boxcar; C-124 Globemaster II	908th TCG transferred from 302d TCW, 18 March 1963; Ordered to Active Service 1 October 1961 for 1961 Berlin Crisis. Relieved from Active Duty 27 August 1962
440th Troop Carrier Wing; Billy Mitchell Field WI	Fifth Air Force Reserve Region	933d TCG; 934th TCG	95th TCS; 96th TCS	Billy Mitchell Field WI; Minneapolis-St Paul IAP MN	C-119 Flying Boxcar	Ordered to Active Service during Cuban Missile Crisis, 28 October-28 November 1962
442d Troop Carrier Wing; Richards-Gebaur AFB MO	Fifth Air Force Reserve Region	935th TCG; 936th TCG; 937th TCG	303d TCS; 304th TCS; 305th TCS	Richards-Gebaur AFB MO; Richards-Gebaur AFB MO; Tinker AFB OK	C-124 Globemaster II	Ordered to Active Service 1 October 1961 for 1961 Berlin Crisis. Relieved from Active Duty 27 August 1962
445th Troop Carrier Wing; Dobbins AFB GA	Third Air Force Reserve Region	918th TCG; 919th TCG; 920th TCG	700th TCS; 701st TCS; 702d TCS	Dobbins AFB GA; Memphis IAP TN; Memphis IAP TN	C-123 Provider; C-124 Globemaster II	Ordered to Active Service during Cuban Missile Crisis, 28 October-28 November 1962; converted to C-124s in 1965
446th Troop Carrier Wing; Ellington AFB TX	Fourth Air Force Reserve Region	924th TCG; 925th TCG; 926th TCG	704th TCS; 705th TCS; 706th TCS	Ellington AFB TX; Ellington AFB TX; NAS New Orleans LA	C-119 Flying Boxcar	
452d Troop Carrier Wing; March AFB, CA	Sixth Air Force Reserve Region	942d TCG; 943d TCG; 944th TCG; 945th TCG	728th TCS; 729th TCS; 730th TCG; 733d TCS	March AFB CA; March AFB CA; March AFB CA; Hill AFB UT	C-119 Flying Boxcar; C-124 Globemaster II	Converted to C-124s in 1966
459th Troop Carrier Wing; Andrews AFB, MD	Second Air Force Reserve Region	909th TCG; 910th TCG; 911th TCG	756th TCS; 757th TCS; 758th TCS	Andrews AFB MD; Youngstown MAP OH; Pittsburgh IAP PA	C-119 Flying Boxcar; C-124 Globemaster II	Converted to C-124s in 1966
512th Troop Carrier Wing; Willow Grove NAS, PA	Second Air Force Reserve Region	912th TCG; 913th TCG; 914th TCG	326th TCS; 327th TCS; 328th TCS	Willow Grove NAS, PA; Willow Grove NAS, PA; Niagara Falls IAP NY	C-119 Flying Boxcar	Ordered to Active Service during Cuban Missile Crisis, 28 October-28 November 1962
514th Troop Carrier Wing; McGuire AFB, NJ	First Air Force Reserve Region	903d TCG; 904th TCG; 905th TCG	335th TCS; 336th TCS; 337th TCS	McGuire AFB, NJ; Stewart AFB, NY; Bradley Field CT	C-119 Flying Boxcar; C-124 Globemaster II	Converted to C-124s in 1965
301st Air Rescue Squadron; Miami IAP FL	Third Air Force Reserve Region				SA-16A Albatros	
302d Air Rescue Squadron; Luke AFB AZ	Sixth Air Force Reserve Region				SA-16A Albatros	
303d Air Rescue Squadron; March AFB CA	Sixth Air Force Reserve Region				SA-16A Albatros	
304th Air Rescue Squadron; Portland IAP OR	Sixth Air Force Reserve Region				SA-16A Albatros	
305th Air Rescue Squadron; Selfridge AFB MI	Fifth Air Force Reserve Region				SA-16A Albatros	

References for above table:

=== Military Air Transport Service Support ===
When the Military Air Transport Service (MATS) replaced the Tactical Air Command as the gaining command for Air Force Reserve C-124 units in July 1963, its commander informed ConAC that it was planning to use the reserve units to conduct airlift missions worldwide. The latter half of 1963 became a period of unprogrammed exercise participation for MATS as the entire defense establishment responded to a Secretary of Defense directive to conduct a series of strategic mobility exercises. To sustain some degree of its normal transpacific cargo capability while it was thus engaged, MATS arranged through ConAC for the Air Force Reserve's C-124 Globemaster II units to begin flying missions on the intercontinental Trans-Pacific transport routes in September 1963.

In the process of training themselves to full operational readiness in their unit equipment, the C-124 units produced a by-product of available aircraft space. The Air Force commonly capitalized on this potential by arranging through ConAC for the reserve units to carry passengers and cargo on their training flights. Between September 1963 and April 1964, the reservists flew the Pacific missions on an irregular basis dictated by MATS changing requirements. With each unit flying about one trip per month, by April 1964 the five reserve groups had completed 22 missions to Tachikawa AB, Japan and 19 to Hickam AFB, Hawaii, for the airlift command. These trips, or missions, took about 8 days, home station to home station, during which the aircraft were in the air for slightly more than 75 hours and on the ground for 13.

MATS became the Military Airlift Command on 1 January 1966.

Beginning in 1966, as active-duty wings received the jet-powered C-141A Starlifter, additional C-124 Globemaster II aircraft were transferred to eight ConAC wings, replacing the C-123 Provider and C-119 Flying Boxcar tactical airlifters. This provided the command with additional intercontinental airlift capacity.

==== Southeast Asia ====
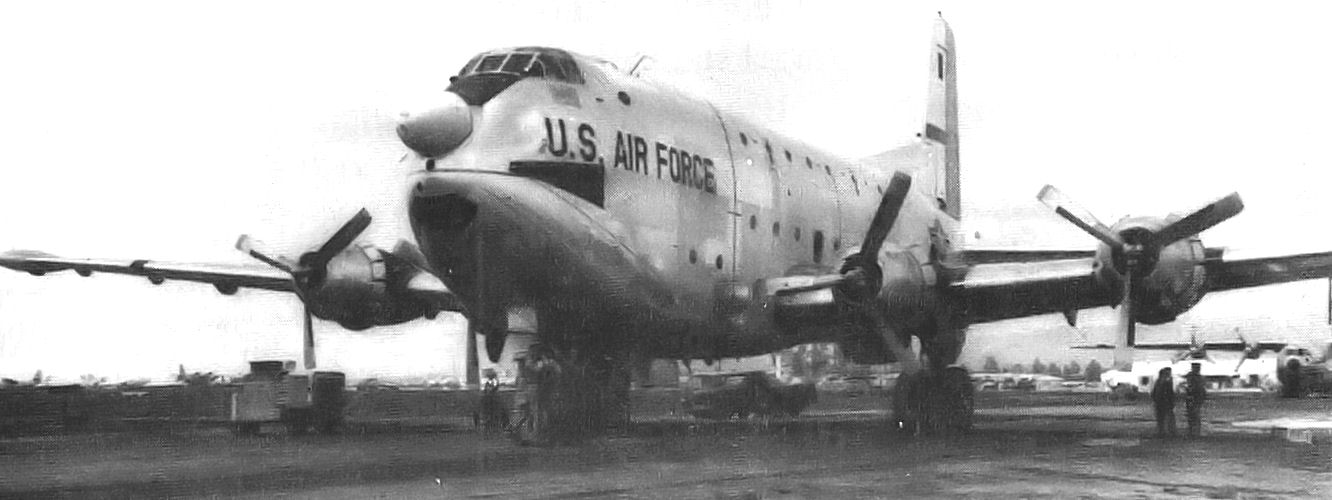
An Air Force Reserve C-124 crew of the 349th Military Airlift Wing, Hamilton AFB, California, awaits clearance at Hickam AFB, Hawaii, to continue its cargo mission to Southeast Asia early in 1967.

By the time John F. Kennedy took office in January 1961, the United States had become deeply involved in Southeast Asia. In South Vietnam and Laos, the United States had tried to stabilize the existing governments and train its military forces to subdue internal guerrilla activity by the communist forces fighting to overthrow and replace them.

The United States did not mobilize reservists for use in Southeast Asia before 1968, and then it mobilized relatively few, because Lyndon B. Johnson, then President of the United States, did not wish to do so. His reasons for not mobilizing reserve forces were many. Primarily, he did not believe that the war in Vietnam, in which the United States merely sought to stabilize the political division of North and South Vietnam as it had existed in 1962, justified the dramatic act of mobilizing reserve forces. He accepted the need to fight the war, but he wanted to prosecute it as quietly as possible, not attracting too much attention at home and risk jeopardizing his domestic programs. He also wanted to avoid drawing the Communist Chinese into the war. Moreover, recalling reservists' complaints of inactivity following the Berlin mobilization of 1961, he was reluctant to recall reservists without the assurance that their employment would significantly affect the course of the war, an assurance no official in his administration could provide.

By the end of 1964, the United States military forces in Southeast Asia had increased to about 23,000 personnel. As the number of United States combat forces in Southeast Asia was increased, so did their logistics requirements, and that was what drew in the Air Force Reserve C-124 units. Before January 1965, the reservists generally had not gone beyond Japan on transport missions for MATS, but in that month they were called upon to go farther. Late in the afternoon of 23 January 1965, MATS asked if the Air Force Reserve C-124 force could provide urgently needed airlift into South Vietnam. It was determined that the Reserve units could perform thirteen trips into Tan Son Nhut Air Base, near Saigon. Twenty days later a C-124 of the 935th Troop Carrier Group was en route to Tan Son Nhut AB from Richards-Gebaur AFB, Missouri, initiating the Air Force Reserve's Southeast Asia commitment.

The thirteen trips were flown in February and March. In mid-April 1965 MATS again requested assistance, this time for all the C-124s that the Air Force Reserve could offer, and reserve crews flew thirty more flights into Tan Son Nhut AB by the end of June 1965. Although not seeming like much, the provision of thirty flights in two months was considerable because the combined strength of the five Air Force Reserve C-124 groups involved was a mere twenty aircraft.

During the first six months of fiscal year 1965, as MATS' need for reserve augmentation continued, the Air Force Reserve C-124 groups flew another forty-one missions into Tachikawa AB and Tan Son Nhut AB, primarily to Tan Son Nhut AB. Thereafter, from January 1966 through November 1972, when the last C-124 left the reserve inventory, the Air Force Reserve C-124 crews on inactive duty flew 1,252 missions into Southeast Asia for the Military Air Transport Service and the Military Airlift Command (MAC), as the command was re-designated in January 1966. These were airlift missions MATS/MAC could not have otherwise conducted; they therefore comprised a significant Air Force Reserve contribution to the Air Force mission.

Lacking sufficient intelligence specialists, in May 1966 the Air Force used reservists on extended active or inactive duty tours to augment the intelligence function at the National Military Intelligence Center and MAC Indications and Warning Center on a continuing basis.

==== Operation Power Pack ====
In April 1965, when a political crisis in the Dominican Republic boiled over into active revolution, President Lyndon B. Johnson dispatched United States Marines and Army soldiers to the island to protect American citizens. To support this force, as well as provide emergency relief supplies to the islanders, the United States conducted an emergency airlift into the island. Participating voluntarily between 30 April and 5 July, Air Force Reserve aircrews flew approximately 1,850 missions and 16,900 hours in Operation POWER PACK, as the emergency airlift was called. About 185 of the missions were flown into the island itself. With the Air Force Reserve C-124 units already heavily committed in support of Southeast Asia operations, the C-119 units bore the primary burden of the Air Reserve's participation in the POWER PACK operation, although there were a few C-123 and C-124 missions as well.

==== Caribbean Operations ====
After the POWER PACK operations confirmed the capability of the Air Force Reserve C-119 units, MATS immediately requested their use on missions along the coasts of North and Central America. This freed MATS' own four-engine aircraft for direct support of the Southeast Asia requirement. At peak periods during 1966 and 1967, Reserve C-119s flew 16 offshore missions weekly-from Dover AFB, Delaware, to Goose Bay AFB and Argentia, Newfoundland; from Patrick AFB, Florida, to Grand Turk and Antigua, West Indies; and from the Norfolk Naval Base, Virginia, to Ramey AFB, Puerto Rico and Guantánamo Bay, Cuba, among other locations. The C-119 support of this mission ended only when the aircraft left the Air Force Reserve inventory in March 1973.

=== Inactivation ===
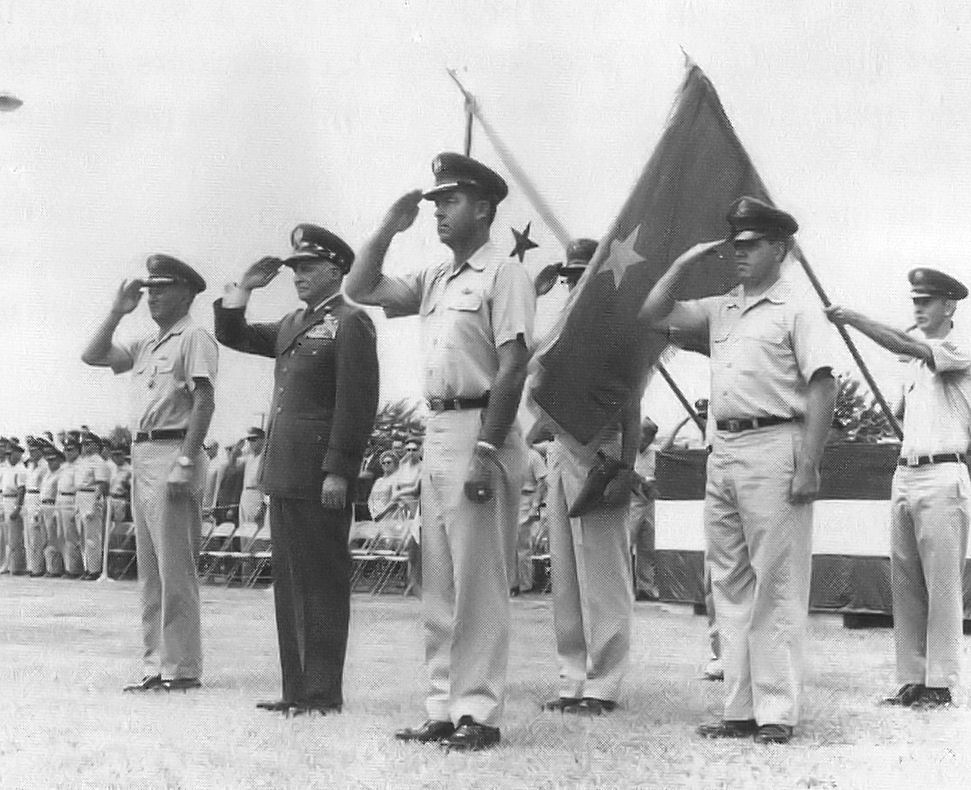
General John P. McConnell (second from left), Air Force Chief of Staff. presides over ceremonies at Robins AFB, Georgia, on 31 July 1968, marking the retirement of Lt. Gen. Henry Viccellio (left) as the last commander of the Continental Air Command on that day, the discontinuation of the Command and establishment of Headquarters Air Force Reserve the next day, and the appointment to command of the new organization and promotion to major general the next day of Brig. Gen. Rollin B. Moore, Jr. (second from right).

For about a year beginning in January 1964, the Air Staff discussed the issue of merging the Air Force's two reserve components. Its considerations were stimulated in part by its own Chief of Staff and in part by related developments in the U.S. Army. For one thing, General Curtis LeMay, who as Vice Chief of Staff in 1959 had advocated eliminating one of the two Air Reserve Forces and as Chief of Staff he revived the issue.

It made no sense to him to have two different reserve systems duplicating recruiting, pay, training, and other activities. He wanted to change the system, but because of the political uproar that erupted every time the active force talked about merger, LeMay asked the Air Reserve Forces Policy Committee to consider it because he did not believe that merger could occur unless reservists themselves advocated it. Thus, while still failing to accept the inadvisability of raising the issue of merging the two air reserve components, General LeMay had at least become wise enough to realize that there could be no merger without the cooperation of reserve leaders.

On the morning of 28 October 1964, Secretary of Defense Robert McNamara asked Secretary of the Air Force Eugene M. Zuckert for a plan to phase the Air Force Reserve into the Air National Guard. One of the criteria posited for the study of options to achieve a single Air Reserve was that the ultimate management structure provide the Chief of Staff of the Air Force with undisputed control over all Air Reserve Forces. However, this was not possible as Air National Guard forces in peacetime were under the control of the Fifty State Governors. Congressional hearings throughout the 1960s on merging the Army National Guard and reserve forces put this issue into the political spotlight and a battle began between McNamara and congressional leaders who opposed the necessary legislation.

In 1967, Public Law 90-168 was passed by Congress on 20 February. The purpose of the legislation was to guarantee in law a structure for each of the reserve components. With respect to the Air Force (and containing comparable provisions applicable to the Army), the law provided that there would be a fourth assistant secretary of Defense, for manpower and reserve affairs; that the role of the Air Reserve Forces Policy Committee would be expanded to enable it to comment upon major policy matters directly affecting the reserve components of the Air Force; that an Office of Air Force Reserve would be created, led by the Chief of Air Force Reserve, a reservist nominated by the president and confirmed by the Senate; that the Secretary of the Air Force was responsible to provide the personnel, equipment, facilities, and other general logistic support necessary to enable Air Force Reserve units and individuals to satisfy their training and mobilization requirements; and that there be a Selected Reserve, that is, a Ready Reserve consisting of units and individuals, whose strength would be mandated annually by Congress. Addressing the issue that had started it all, the law mandated that there be units in both components, thereby precluding any merger of the Air Force Reserve and the Air National Guard.

Brigadier General Tomas E. Marchbanks, Jr became the first Chief of Air Force Reserve. The Senate confirmed his nomination as Chief and promotion to Major General on 16 February 1968. On 23 February, Marchbanks briefed Air Force Chief of Staff General John P. McConnell and several Air Staff personnel and manpower officials on his proposal for organizing his office and the Air Force Reserve. The essential features of the option he recommended were that Headquarters Continental Air Command would be replaced at Robins AFB, Georgia, by Headquarters, Air Force Reserve (AFRES). The new organization would be a separate operating agency established as a field extension of the Office of Air Force Reserve and would be commanded by another reserve major general recalled to active duty for the purpose. General Marchbanks and his reserve advisers did not want to retain the large Regular Air Force Continental Air Command as a link in the new Air Force Reserve chain of command. McConnell accepted the recommendation, and the proposal was endorsed by the Air Reserve Forces Policy Committee on 18 March and approved shortly thereafter by Secretary of the Air Force Harold Brown.

On 1 August 1968, the reorganization of the field management structure of the Air Force Reserve became effective. Headquarters Continental Air Command was discontinued at Robins AFB, Georgia. Replacing it was Headquarters AFRES, constituted and activated as a separate operating agency with the procedural functions and responsibilities of a major command. The Air Reserve Personnel Center ceased functioning as an organizational element of Continental Air Command and became a separate operating agency.

Jurisdiction of the Air National Guard was reassigned on 10 May 1979 to the Air National Guard Support Center, which was constituted as a direct reporting unit, and activated on 1 June 1979 at Andrews AFB, Maryland, with assignment directly to the USAF.

Continental Air Command was later disestablished on 21 September 1984. AFRES was later redesignated the Air Force Reserve Command on 17 February 1997 and status changed from a field operating agency to a major command of the United States Air Force.

==== Successor ====
Today, USAF Reserve support continues for the Air Mobility Command (the successor to the Military Airlift Command), with personnel and aircraft routinely flying transcontinental airlift missions as associate units flying front-line C-17 Globemaster III and C-5 Galaxy transports worldwide in support of the active duty Air Force.

=== Lineage ===
- Established as Continental Air Command, and organized, on 1 December 1948

Discontinued on 1 August 1968
Disestablished on 21 September 1984

=== Components ===
Agencies

- Air Defense Command, 1 December 1948 – 1 July 1950
- Tactical Air Command, 1 December 1948 – 1 December 1950

Air Forces

- First Air Force, 1 December 1948 – 23 June 1958
- Fourth Air Force, December 1948-1 September 1960
- Ninth Air Force*, 1 December 1948 – 1 December 1950
- Tenth Air Force, 1 December 1948 – 1 September 1960
- Twelfth Air Force*, 1 December 1948 – 1 December 1950
- Fourteenth Air Force, 1 December 1948 – 1 July 1968

* Tactical Air Command NAFs

Regions

- First Air Force Reserve Region: 1 September 1960 – 1 August 1968

(Stewart AFB, NY) Responsible for the training of all Air Force Reservists in the six New England states, New York and New Jersey

- Second Air Force Reserve Region: 1 September 1960 – 24 June 1966

(Andrews AFB, MD) Responsible for the training of all Air Force Reservists in Ohio, Pennsylvania, Kentucky, Maryland, Delaware, Virginia, West Virginia and the District of Columbia. Inactivated 24 June 1966, merged into First Region.

- Third Air Force Reserve Region: 1 September 1960 – 1 August 1968

(Dobbins AFB, GA) Responsible for the training of all Air Force Reservists in Georgia, Alabama, Mississippi, Florida, Tennessee, and North and South Carolina.

- Fourth Air Force Reserve Region: 1 September 1960 – 1 August 1968

(Randolph AFB, TX) Responsible for the training of all Air Force Reservists in Texas, Arkansas, Louisiana, Oklahoma and New Mexico.

- Fifth Air Force Reserve Region: 1 September 1960 – 1 August 1968

(Selfridge AFB, MI) Responsible for the training of all Air Force Reservists in Michigan, Wisconsin, Indiana, Illinois, Minnesota, Iowa, Missouri, Kansas, Nebraska, and North and South Dakota

- Sixth Air Force Reserve Region: 1 September 1960 – 1 August 1968

(Hamilton AFB, CA) Responsible for the training of all Air Force Reservists in California, Arizona, Nevada, Utah, Colorado, Wyoming, Idaho, Montana, Washington and Oregon

=== Stations ===
- Mitchel Air Force Base, New York, 1 December 1948
- Robins Air Force Base, Georgia, 1 April 1961 – 1 August 1968

== See also ==
- List of Air National Guard units
- Air Force Reserve Command
- First Air Force
