= Fort Miami =

Fort Miami or variant, was the name of several forts in what is now the United States:

- Fort Miami (Michigan)
- Fort Miami (Indiana), originally Fort des Miamis then Fort St. Philippe
- Fort Miami (Ohio), originally Fort Miamis

== See also ==
- Port Miami (disambiguation)
- Miami (disambiguation)
- Fort (disambiguation)
