= Miami, Alexandria =

Miami ميامى
- Location in Egypt
- Coordinates: 31.267694°N 29.995365°E
- Country: Egypt
- Governorate: Alexandria
- Time zone: UTC+2 (EET)
  - Summer (DST): UTC+3 (EEST)

Miami (Egyptian Arabic: ميامى) is a neighborhood in Alexandria, Egypt. Miami is a residential area belonging to the Sidi Bishr Bahri area in the first Montazah district. Miami occupies a large area in the First Montaza District, especially the areas of Bahri Abu Qir. It is a tourist area from other Egyptian cities close to the beach, so it contains a large number of restaurants and shops.

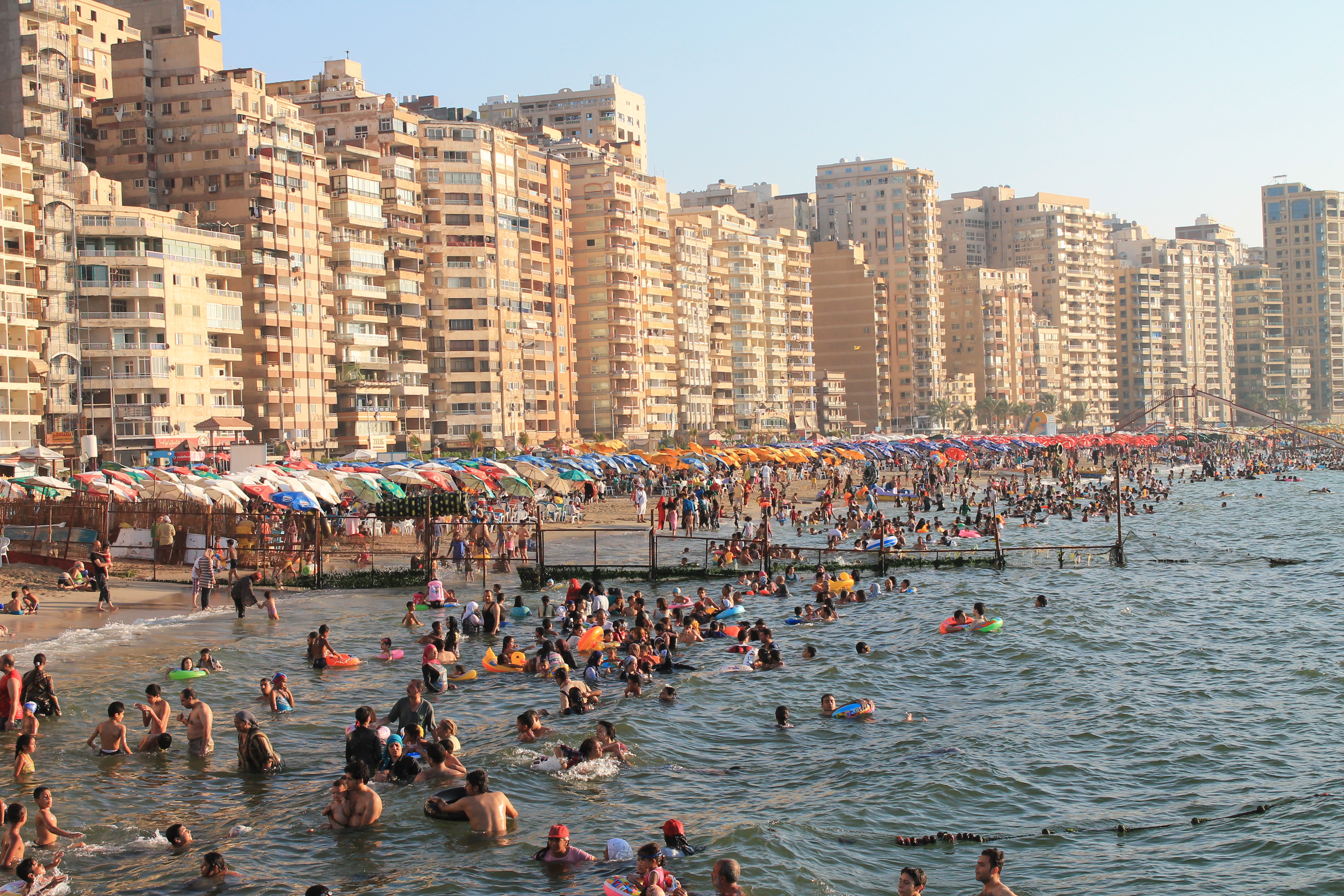
One of Miami beaches, 2014.

== Etymology ==
Miami, Alexandria was named after Miami, Florida, which itself was named after the Mayaimi native American tribe.

The word in the Mayaimi language probably meant Big Water.

== See also ==
- Neighborhoods in Alexandria
