= Miami Army Airfield =

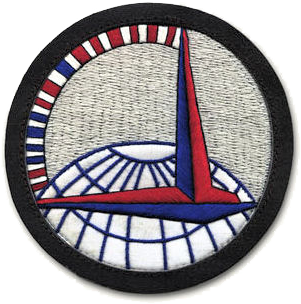
Miami Army Airfield
- Part of Air Transport Command
- Located near: Miami, Florida
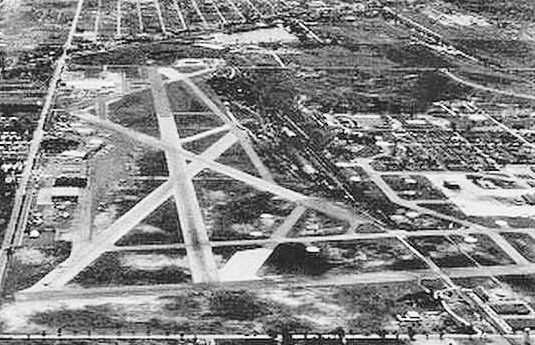
- Miami Army Airfield - 1945

Location
- Coordinates: 25°48′19″N 080°16′13″W

Site history
- In use: 1940-1946

Miami Army Airfield, was a World War II United States Army Air Forces airfield located at the 36th Street Airport in Miami, Florida. The military airfield closed in 1946 and the airport was returned to civil use. In 1949, the airport became a United States Air Force Reserve base until 1960.

The former Air Force Reserve station and the World War II Air Transport Command facilities are found on the northeast corner of the airport, now just east of the end of the 26R runway of Miami International Airport.

== History ==
The Army Air Corps began using the airport in the 1930s, assigning the 21st Reconnaissance Squadron to the airfield from Langley Field, Virginia to fly search and rescue missions along with weather reconnaissance patrols.

=== Antisubmarine mission ===
After the Pearl Harbor Attack and the United States entry into World War II, the Air Force's use of the airport changed to being a base for antisubmarine patrols, with the airport becoming the Headquarters, for the 26th Antisubmarine Wing of the Army Air Forces Antisubmarine Command (AAFAC) from 20 November 1942 – 15 October 1943. The AAFAC flew antisubmarine patrols, searching for and attacking German U-boats from the airport using B-18 Bolo and B-24 Liberator bombers specially equipped with radar.

=== Technical Training Command ===
On 16 July 1942, Army Air Forces Technical Training Command, First District, initiated a contract with Eastern Airlines for training of pilots in long distance transports at the airport.

=== Air Transport Command ===
Beginning in June 1941, the Miami 36th Street Airport had been established as a lend-lease supply line to British forces fighting in the Near East. Ferrying of aircraft from the airport started as early as June of that year, when a Pan American Airways subsidiary (Pan American Air Ferries, Inc) (PAAF) undertook the delivery of twenty lend-lease transport planes to Lagos on the Nigerian coast of western Africa, where the British had developed a trans-African air route to Khartoum in the Anglo-Egyptian Sudan. The success of this first operation led to contracts between the War Department and Pan American organization for more permanent ferrying and transport services all the way into Khartoum. Just before the Pearl Harbor Attack in December similar services under military control were opened into Cairo.

Through most of 1942, lend-lease planes, with few exceptions, were delivered from the airport over the South Atlantic Ferrying Route by civilian crews of PAAF. Aircraft deliveries by Pan American had not exceeded ten a month before February 1942, and nearly all of these had gone to the British. But the flow of aircraft picked up in March, and by early summer a steady flow of planes was moving out to British forces in Egypt, to the Russians through Iran, and, in lesser number, across India and over the Himalayas to the Chinese.

Air Transport Command (ATC) had actual command over only one of the bases, the staging base for ferried aircraft at Morrison Field, West Palm Beach, Florida beginning in January 1942. The two other Florida bases, the Miami 36th Street Airport and Homestead Army Airfield would come under ATC control by the end of the year. Most ferried aircraft on the way overseas were given a final checking and servicing at Morrison Field, the major continental ferrying base, and here the ferrying crews had their papers put in order, were issued overseas equipment, inoculated, and briefed on route conditions. Homestead Field was assigned to the ATC Caribbean Wing in order to insure adequate staging facilities for the heavy flow of ferried aircraft were available after the invasion of North Africa.

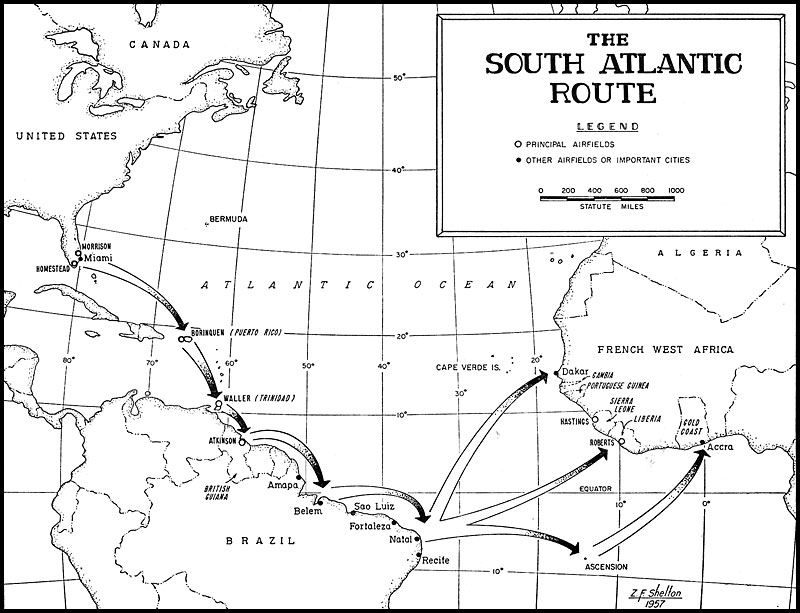
South Atlantic Route Map

Passengers and a small amount of freight were carried on ferried aircraft when there was extra space, but, for the most part, passengers, cargo, and mail moved out of the 36th Street Airport in Miami.

On 7 July 1942 the Air Intransit Depot No. 6, staffed by experienced freight handlers of the Air Service Command was set up at the airport. The depot saved much cargo space by repackaging. A large proportion of the freight arriving at Miami at that time was packed in heavy wooden crates or other materials suitably designed for rail or water shipment but excessively heavy for air shipment. At one period during 1942, repacking was required on an estimated 40 per cent of the cargo arriving at Miami, with results calculated at a 30 per cent reduction in weight. The weight saved on some items was almost fantastic. A shipment of P-39 air scoops arriving at Miami weighed 128 pounds per unit, a figure reduced by repacking to 17 pounds. On another occasion, the depot received a package of four elevator assemblies having a total weight in excess of 1,000 pounds. When repacked in packages, each package weighed 108 pounds for a total saving of 588 pounds.

In May 1944, Pan American Airways began flying the middle Atlantic route, going from Miami Airport through Bermuda and the Azores to Casablanca, French Morocco. Pan American began with one round trip daily between Miami and Casablanca. This was stepped up to two round trips in June, and to four in August, when Pan American's Douglas C-54 Skymasters were withdrawn from the South Atlantic route and the whole fleet of aircraft, amounting to twenty-seven transports (C-54A's and C-54B's), was concentrated on the middle Atlantic route to Casablanca.

After the end of hostilities in Europe, the airport was one of three terminus in Florida for the "Green Project", the transport of overseas aircraft and personnel from Europe, Africa and the Middle East to the United States. Like much of the other planning in the spring of 1945, the Green Project predicated on the belief that the war against Japan might not be concluded before the following spring. But early in August, as the Japanese surrender became imminent, new commitments to the Pacific forced ATC to transfer to its Pacific routes eighty-two C-54's, most of which were then in use on the Green Project. As a result, by 10 August Green Project goals had been cut from transporting 50,000 to 35,000 personnel a month from overseas combat theaters to Florida. Later, this was reduced to 10,000 personnel a month, the remainder being transported home by Naval sealift units.

By the end of 1945, the existing military fields at Homestead and West Palm Beach were capable of receiving the returning aircraft and personnel, and the civilian 36th Street Airport in Miami was returned to civil control.

=== Air Force Reserve Use ===
In 1949, Miami Airport became the home to the United States Air Force Reserve 2585th Air Force Reserve Training Center. Two years earlier, Continental Air Command had assigned the Reserve 100th Bombardment Group to the airport with two squadrons of B-29 Superfortresses. However, ConAC did not have the funding nor personnel to stand up the organization and it remained an administrative organization until inactivated in June 1949.

The Tactical Air Command gained 435th Troop Carrier Wing, equipped with C-46 Commandos, became the main Air Force Reserve unit assigned to the Miami Airport throughout the 1940s and 1950s. Later upgraded to C-119 Flying Boxcars, the Wing was activated on 1 December 1952 and all personnel and aircraft were reassigned to active-duty units as replacement personnel. Although reactivated the same day, the administrative unit was not returned to strength until July 1953 when the 456th Troop Carrier Wing transferred its personnel and equipment to the 435th.

In 1956, Military Air Transport Service, returned to Miami Airport when it activated several reserve air rescue squadrons as part of its Air Rescue Service. The 301st Rescue Squadron was the Air Force Reserve's first and only rescue squadron. The unit made its first rescue in January 1957. Earlier, the active-duty MATS 6th Weather Squadron (Air Weather Service) had moved its aircraft and personnel to Miami Airport from its Lend-Lease bases in the Caribbean after they were ordered closed by the Truman Administration in 1949 as a cost-savings measure. After a short stay in Miami, the Hurricane Hunter aircraft of the squadron were reassigned to Patrick AFB where they operated as a support for the various space and atmospheric missile tests over the Atlantic Missile Range.

The increasing growth of the Miami Airport and the large volume of aircraft traffic led the Air Force to inactivate the Troop Carrier units in 1959. MATS moved the Air Rescue Service units in 1960 to Patrick AFB where the units began a long relationship with NASA and the U.S. space program, providing rescue-contingency operations for the first Mercury launch.

Air Defense Command, however, sent a flight of F-104 Starfighter interceptor aircraft to the Miami Airport in 1961 as a defensive measure to monitor any Soviet Aircraft which might intrude on United States airspace from Cuba during the 1961 Berlin Crisis. With their return to Seymour Johnson AFB at the end of December 1961, the military use of Miami International Airport came to a close.

=== Major units assigned ===
Antisubmarine coastal patrols

- 21st Reconnaissance Squadron (Heavy), 9 September 1939 – 22 April 1941 (B-18, B-17)
- 106th Observation Squadron, 14 December 1941 – 14 March 1942
- 97th Observation Squadron, 15 December 1941 – 8 November 1942
- 19th Observation Squadron, 2–7 March 1942
- 26th Antisubmarine Wing, 25 July 1942 – 23 September 1943

Ferrying (later Air Transport) Command

- Station established: June 1941 (Pan American Air Ferries, Inc)

Designated: 313th Materiel Squadron, November 1941

Ferrying operated under contract to Pan American Air Ferries, Inc

- Air Intransit Depot No. 6, 7 July 1942
- 1595th Army Air Forces Base Unit (First Foreign Transport Group), 15 November 1943

Re-designated: 1105th Army Air Forces Base Unit, 1 July 1944-30 September 1945

United States Air Force Reserve

- 100th Bombardment Group, 29 May 1947 – 27 June 1949 (Not equipped)
- 435th Troop Carrier Wing (Medium), 26 June 1949 – 1 December 1952; 1 December 1952 – 14 April 1959
- 482d Troop Carrier Group, 14 June-1 December 1952
- 456th Troop Carrier Wing (Medium), 1 December 1952 – 25 July 1953
- 301st Air Rescue Squadron, 9 March 1956 – 30 June 1960
- 320th Rescue Squadron, 1 July 1956 – 30 June 1960
- 6th Weather Squadron (Regional), 1 May 1949 – 30 March 1950

1961 Berlin Crisis

- 482d Fighter-Interceptor Squadron, 1 July-31 December 1961 (TDY Seymour Johnson) (F-102)

== See also ==
- Florida World War II Army Airfields
