= Miami High School (disambiguation) =

Miami High School may refer to:

- Miami High School (Arizona), Miami, Arizona
- Miami High School (Oklahoma), Miami, Oklahoma
- Miami East High School, Casstown, Ohio
- Miami Senior High School, Miami, Florida
- Miami State High School, Miami, Queensland, Australia
- Miami Trace High School, Washington Court House, Ohio
- Little Miami High School, Morrow, Ohio
- Miami School, Miami, Texas

== See also ==
- Miami-Dade County Public Schools, a public school district serving Miami-Dade County, Florida
- Education in Miami, Florida
