= Miami Villa, Ohio =

- Former unincorporated community
- Location within Ohio Location within the United States
- Coordinates: 39°50′50″N 84°10′12″W
- Country: United States
- State: Ohio
- County: Montgomery
- City: Huber Heights
- Elevation: 764 ft (233 m)
- Time zone: UTC-5 (Eastern (EST))
  - Summer (DST): UTC-4 (EDT)
- ZIP Code: 45424 (Huber Heights)
- GNIS feature ID: 1048972

Miami Villa is a former unincorporated community in Montgomery County, in the U.S. state of Ohio. It is now an area within the city of Huber Heights.
