= Port Miami (disambiguation) =

Port Miami, PortMiami, Port of Miami, or variation, may refer to:

- PortMiami (Dante B. Fascell Port of Miami), Florida, USA; the seaport of the city of Miami; at the mouth of the Miami River on Biscayne Bay
- Port Miami Tunnel (S.R. 887), Miami, Florida, USA; a tunnel under Biscayne Bay
- Miami River Port, Miami River (Florida), Miami, Florida, USA; a riverine port with seaborne commercial service
- Port of Miami (album), 2006 album by Rick Ross
- Port of Miami 2, 2019 album by Rick Ross

== See also ==
- Miami airport (disambiguation)
- Fort Miami (disambiguation)
