= Miami Township =

Miami Township may refer to:

== Indiana ==
- Miami Township, Cass County, Indiana

== Kansas ==
- Miami Township, Miami County, Kansas, in Miami County, Kansas
- Miami Township, Reno County, Kansas, in Reno County, Kansas

== Missouri ==
- Miami Township, Saline County, Missouri

== Ohio ==
- Miami Township, Clermont County, Ohio
- Miami Township, Greene County, Ohio
- Miami Township, Hamilton County, Ohio
- Miami Township, Logan County, Ohio
- Miami Township, Montgomery County, Ohio
