= 302nd Troop Carrier Squadron =

302d Troop Carrier Squadron
- Active: 1943-1951
- Country: United States
- Branch: United States Air Force

The 302d Troop Carrier Squadron is an inactive United States Air Force unit. Its last assignment was with the 441st Troop Carrier Group, based at Chicago-Orchard Airport, Illinois. It was inactivated on 14 March 1951.

== History ==
Activated in August 1943 at Sedalia AAF, Missouri as an I Troop Carrier Command C-47 Squadron. After training in Missouri and later North Carolina, was sent to Baer Field, Indiana for final equipping with aircraft, personnel and other equipment. Deployed to Ninth Air Force in England, assigned to IX Troop Carrier Command in March 1944 during the build-up prior to the Invasion of France.

The squadron participated in the D-Day operation, dropping 101st Airborne Division paratroops near Cherbourg – Maupertus Airport, then carried out re-supply and glider delivery missions the following day.

The squadron's aircraft flew supplies into Normandy as soon as suitable landing strips were available and evacuated casualties to England. On 17 July the air echelon flew to Grosseto airbase in Italy to prepare for operations connected with the invasion of southern France returning to England on 24 August.

Squadron moved to France in September 1944 and for the balance of the Northern France Campaign and the Western Allied invasion of Germany was engaged in combat resupply of ground forces, operating from Advanced Landing Grounds in northern France. Delivered supplies to rough Resupply and Evacuation airfields near the front lines, returning combat casualties to field hospitals in rear areas.

Demobilized in France after the end of the European War, was inactivated at Bolling Field, DC in early 1946 as an administrative organization.

Reactivated as a C-46 Commando reserve transport squadron in 1949, activated as part of the Korean War mobilization in 1951. Unit personnel and aircraft were assigned as fillers to active-duty units and the squadron was quickly inactivated afterwards.

=== Operations and decorations ===
- Combat Operations. Included airborne assaults on Normandy, southern France, the Netherlands, and Germany, relief of Bastogne, and aerial transportation in ETO and MTO, during World War II.
- Campaigns. Rome-Arno; Normandy, Northern France; Southern France; Rhineland; Ardennes-Alsace; Central Europe.
- Decorations. Distinguished Unit Citation: France, [6-7] Jun 1944.

=== Lineage ===
- Constituted 302d Troop Carrier Squadron on 25 May 1943

Activated on 1 Aug 1943
Inactivated on 27 May 1946

- Re-designated 302d Troop Carrier Squadron (Medium) on 10 May 1949

Activated in the reserve on 27 Jun 1949
Ordered to active service on 10 Mar 1951
Inactivated on 14 Mar 1951.

=== Assignments ===
- 441st Troop Carrier Group, 1 Aug 1943
- 314th Troop Carrier Group, 15 May 1945
- 27th Air Transport Group, 8 Aug 1945
- 314th Troop Carrier Group, 15 Oct 1945 – 27 May 1946
- 441st Troop Carrier Group, 27 Jun 1949 – 14 Mar 1951

=== Stations ===
- Sedalia Army Air Field, Missouri, 1 Aug 1943
- Camp Mackall North Carolina, 18 Jan 1944
- Baer Field, Indiana, 22 Feb-1 Mar 1944
- RAF Langar (AAF-490), England, 17 Mar 1944
- RAF Merryfield (AAF-464), England, 27 Apr 1944

Operated from Grosseto Airfield, Italy, 18 Jul-24 Aug 1944

- Villeneuve-Vertus Airfield (A-63), France, 8 Sep 1944
- Saint Marceau Airfield (A-43), France, 2 Oct 1944
- Dreux/Vernouillet Airfield (A-41), France, 2 Nov 1944
- Poix Airfield (B-44), France, 28 May 1945
- Villacoublay Airfield (A-42), France, 14 Aug 1945 – 15 Feb 1946
- Bolling Field, DC, 15 Feb-27 May 1946
- Chicago-Orchard Airport, Illinois, 27 Jun 1949 – 14 Mar 1951

=== Aircraft ===
- Principally C-47 Skytrain, 1943-1946
- C-46 Commando, 1949-1951
