= 99th Airlift Squadron =

Part of US Air Force 89th Airlift Wing operating executive transport

99th Airlift Squadron

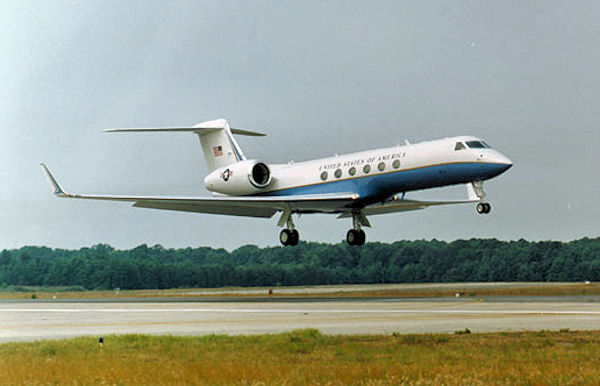
- 89th Airlift Wing C-37A Gulfstream V
- Active: 1943–1946; 1949–1951; 1965–1977; 1988–present
- Country: United States
- Branch: United States Air Force
- Role: Airlift
- Part of: Air Mobility Command
- Garrison/HQ: Andrews Air Force Base
- Motto: SAM Fox
- Engagements: Operation Overlord; Operation Dragoon; Operation Market Garden; Battle of Bastogne
- Decorations: Distinguished Unit Citation; Air Force Outstanding Unit Award

Commanders
- Current commander: Lt. Col. Brandon Dewey

Insignia
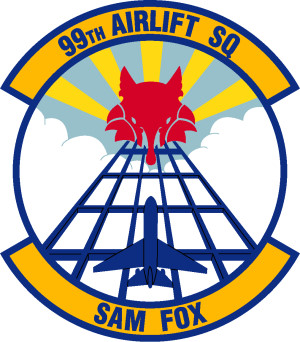
- 99th Airlift Squadron emblem (approved 24 April 1989)

The 99th Airlift Squadron is part of the 89th Airlift Wing at Andrews Air Force Base, Maryland. The 99th AS directly supports the Vice President, members of the Cabinet, Congress, and other U.S. and foreign dignitaries. The squadron flies specially configured C-37 Gulfstream V aircraft on Special Air Missions directed by Headquarters United States Air Force.

== History ==
=== World War II ===
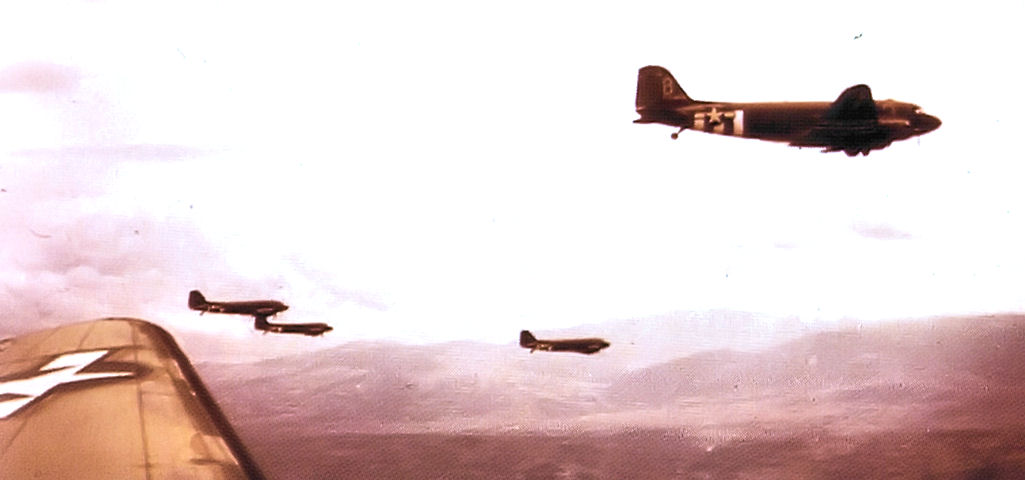
99th Troop Carrier squadron C-47s in formation during Operation Varsity, March 1945

The 99th participated in airborne assaults on Normandy, Southern France, Holland, Germany, relief of Bastogne, and transportation of cargo and personnel in European Theater of Operations and the Mediterranean Theater of Operations during World War II.

The 99th has conducted airlift support for the President and other high-ranking dignitaries of the U.S. and foreign governments from 1966–1977 and since 1988.

On 30 August 2017, the unit's Gulfstream C-20's were retired.

=== Campaigns and decorations ===
- Campaigns. World War II: Rome-Arno; Normandy; Northern France; Southern France; Rhineland; Ardennes-Alsace; Central Europe.
- Decorations. Distinguished Unit Citation: France, [6–7] Jun 1944. Air Force Outstanding Unit Awards: 1 Jul 1966 – 30 Jun 1968; 1 Jul 1968 – 30 Jun 1970; 1 Jul 1970 – 30 Jun 1972; 1 Jul 1972 – 30 Jun 1974; 1 Jul 1974 – 31 Dec 1975; 1 Jan 1976 – 31 Jan 1977; [1 Oct 1988]-30 Jun 1989; 1 Jul 1989 – 30 Jun 1991; 1 Jul 1991 – 30 Jun 1992; 1 Jul 1992 – 30 Jun 1994; 1 Jul 1994 – 30 Jun 1996; 1 Jul 1996 – 30 Jun 1998; 1 Jul 1998 – 30 Jun 2000; 1 Jul 2000 – 30 Jun 2002; 1 Jul 2002 – 30 Jun 2004; 1 Jul 2004 – 30 Jun 2005; 1 Jul 2005 – 30 Jun 2006; 1 Jul 2006 – 30 Jun 2007; 1 Jul 2007 – 30 Jun 2008; 1 Jul 2008 – 30 Jun 2009.

== Lineage ==
- Constituted as the 99th Troop Carrier Squadron on 25 May 1943

Activated on 1 August 1943
Inactivated on 27 March 1946

- Redesignated 99th Troop Carrier Squadron, Medium on 10 May 1949

Activated in the reserve on 27 June 1949
Ordered to active service on 10 March 1951
Inactivated on 14 March 1951

- Redesignated 99th Military Airlift Squadron, Special Mission and activated on 27 December 1965 (not organized)

Organized on 8 January 1966
Inactivated on 12 September 1977

- Redesignated 99th Military Airlift Squadron on 13 September 1988

Activated on 1 October 1988
Redesignated 99th Airlift Squadron on 12 July 1991

=== Assignments ===
- 441st Troop Carrier Group, 1 August 1943
- 27th Air Transport Group, 27 August 1945
- United States Air Forces in Europe, 25 September 1945
- Continental Air Forces (later Strategic Air Command), 15 February–27 March 1946
- 441st Troop Carrier Group, 27 Jun 1949 – 14 Mar 1951
- Military Air Transport Service (later Military Airlift Command), 27 December 1965 (not organized)
- 89th Military Airlift Wing, 8 January 1966 – 12 September 1977
- 89th Military Airlift Wing, 1 October 1988
- 89th Operations Group, 12 July 1991 – present

=== Stations ===
- Sedalia Army Air Field, Missouri, 1 August 1943
- Camp Mackall North Carolina, 18 January 1944
- Baer Field, Indiana, 22 February–2 March 1944
- RAF Langar (AAF-490), England, 17 March 1944
- RAF Merryfield (AAF-464), England, 25 April 1944

Portion of air echelon operated from Grosseto Airfield, Italy, 18 July–24 August 1944

- Villeneuve-Vertus Airfield (A-63), France, 8 September 1944

Operated from RAF Langar (AAF-490), England, 11–24 Sep 1944

- Saint Marceau Airfield (A-43), France, 1 October 1944
- Dreux/Vernouillet Airfield (A-41), France, 4 November 1944

Operated from Chartres Airfield (A-40), France, 14–24 Mar 1945
Operated from Toul-Croix De Metz Airfield (A-90), France, 29 Apr-16 May 1945

- Villacoublay Airfield (A-42), France, c. 2 September 1945
- AAF Station Wiesbaden, Germany, c. 1 October 1945 – 15 February 1946
- Bolling Field, DC, 15 February–27 March 1946
- Chicago-Orchard Airport (later O'Hare International Airport), Illinois, 27 June 1949 – 14 March 1951
- Andrews Air Force Base, Maryland, 8 January 1966 – 12 September 1977
- Andrews Air Force Base, Maryland, 1 October 1988 – present

=== Aircraft ===
- Douglas C-47 Skytrain (1943–1945)
- Waco CG-4 (1943–1945)
- Consolidated C-109 Liberator Express (1945–1946)
- Curtiss C-46 Commando (1945–1946, 1949–1951)
- Douglas C-53 Skytrooper (1945–1946)
- North American AT-6 Texan (1945–1946)
- Boeing B-17 Flying Fortress (1945–1946)
- North American B-25 Mitchell (1945–1946)
- Boeing B-29 Superfortress (1945–1946)
- Beechcraft C-45 Expeditor (1945–1946)
- Fairchild C-61 Argus (1945–1946)
- Cessna C-78 (1945–1946)
- Stinson L-1 Vigilant (1945–1946)
- Piper L-4 Grasshopper (1945–1946)
- Stinson L-5 Sentinel (1945–1946)
- Republic P-47 Thunderbolt (1945–1946)
- North American P-51 Mustang (1945–1946)
- Lockheed C-140 Jetstar (1966–1971)
- Lockheed VC-140 Jetstar (1966–1977)
- Aero Commander U-4 (1966–1969)
- Beechcraft VC-6 King Air (1966–1977)
- Convair C-131 (1966–1968)
- Convair VC-131 (1968–1975)
- McDonnell Douglas VC-9 (1988–2005)
- Gulfstream C-20 (1988–2017)
- Gulfstream C-37A Gulfstream V (1994–present)
- Gulfstream C-37B (2009–present)
