= 441st Troop Carrier Group =

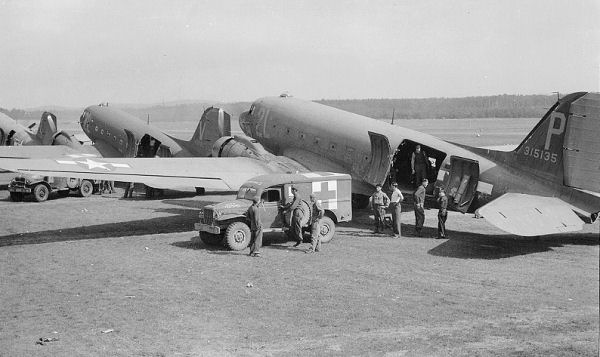
- Group C-47A (Note: Aircraft is Douglas C-47A-80-DL, serial 43-15135 of the 302d Troop Carrier Squadron.)
- Active: 1943–1946; 1949–1951
- Country: United States
- Branch: United States Air Force
- Role: Troop Carrier
- Engagements: European Theater of Operations
- Decorations: Distinguished Unit Citation

The 441st Troop Carrier Group is an inactive United States Air Force organization. Its last assignment was to the 441st Troop Carrier Wing, stationed at Chicago O'Hare International Airport, Illinois, where it was inactivated on 14 March 1951.

During World War II, the group was a Douglas C-47 Skytrain transport unit assigned to IX Troop Carrier Command in Western Europe. The 441st group flew combat paratroopers on airborne assaults on Normandy (Operation Overlord); Southern France (Operation Dragoon); the Netherlands (Operation Market-Garden), and Germany (Operation Varsity). It also flew combat resupply missions in the relief of Bastogne in 1945.

== History ==
=== World War II ===
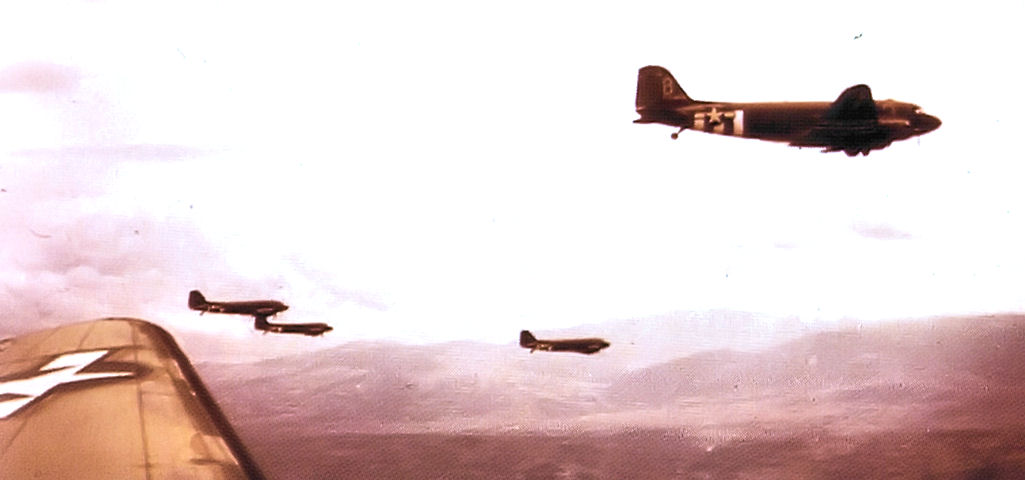
99th Troop Carrier squadron C-47s in formation during Operation Varsity, March 1945

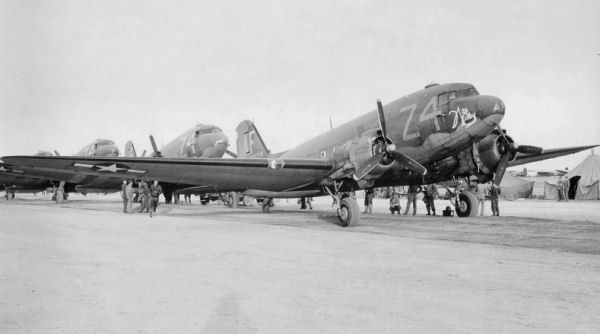
Douglas C-47A-25-DK Skytrain Serial 42-93708 of the 301st TCS

Constituted as 441st Troop Carrier Group on 25 May 1943. Activated on 1 August 1943. Used Douglas C-47 Skytrains to train for overseas duty. Moved to RAF Langar, England, February–March 1944, and assigned to Ninth Air Force. The group was assigned to the 50th Troop Carrier Wing of IX Troop Carrier Command. It was scheduled to be assigned to RAF Langar, however it only remained until 25 April until moving to RAF Merryfield.

From Merryfield, the group participated in the D-Day operation, dropping 101st Airborne Division paratroops near Cherbourg Naval Base, then carried out resupply and glider delivery missions the following day. For its efficiency and achievements during these two days it was, like other troop carrier groups, awarded a Distinguished Unit Citation. During these missions, three C-47s and two CG-4A gliders were missing in action.

The group's aircraft flew supplies into Normandy as soon as suitable landing strips were available and evacuated casualties to Merryfield. On 17 July the air echelons of the 99th, 100th and 302nd Troop Carrier Squadrons moved to Grosseto Airfield in Italy to prepare for operations connected with the Operation Dragoon, the invasion of southern France, returning to Merryfield on 24 August.

Meanwhile, the 301st Troop Carrier Squadron remained active on the Normandy shuttle while supplies were urgently needed for the advancing Allied armies, although operating from RAF Ramsbury from 7 August until the other squadrons returned.

Soon afterwards word was received that the 50th Troop Carrier Wing would move to France, the 441st being one of the first two groups, with headquarters leaving Merryfield on 6 September for its Advanced Landing Ground at Villeneuve-Vertus Airfield.

From RAF Langar in Nottinghamshire the group dropped paratroops of 82nd and 101st Airborne Divisions near Nijmegen on 17 September Operation Market-Garden, and towed gliders with reinforcements on 18 and 23 September.

In December, the group transported ammunition, rations, medicine, and other supplies to troops of 101st Airborne Division surrounded by the enemy at Bastogne. Released gliders carrying troops of 17th Airborne Division near Wesel on 24 March 1945 when the Allies launched the Operation Varsity, the airborne assault across the Rhine. Hauled gasoline to armored columns in Germany after the Allies crossed the Rhine.

Continually transported freight and personnel in the theater when not participating in airborne operations. Evacuated casualties and prisoners who had been liberated.

The 441st remained overseas after the war as part of United States Air Forces in Europe, performing occupation duty from Frankfurt Germany. It continued to transport personnel and equipment, using Curtiss C-46 Commando, C-47, and Consolidated C-109 Liberator Express aircraft.

The group was inactivated at Eschborn Air Base, Germany on 30 September 1946 and its mission, personnel and equipment were transferred to the 61st Troop Carrier Group, which was simultaneously activated.

=== Air Force reserve ===
The group was reactivated as a reserve unit in June 1949, when Continental Air Command reorganized its flying units under the wing base organization. The 441st Troop Carrier Wing was activated as the headquarters for the group and its support elements. Assigned C-46 Commando aircraft, the wing was inactivated in March 1951 when its equipment and personnel were transferred to active duty units during the Korean War.

== Lineage ==
441st Troop Carrier Group

- Constituted as the 441st Troop Carrier Group on 25 May 1943

Activated on 1 August 1943
Inactivated on 30 September 1946

- Redesignated 441st Troop Carrier Group, Medium on 10 May 1949

Activated in the reserve on 27 June 1949
Ordered into active service on 10 March 1951
Inactivated on 14 March 1951

441st Troop Carrier Wing

- Established as the 441st Troop Carrier Wing, Medium on 10 May 1949

Activated in the reserve on 27 June 1949
Ordered into active service on 10 March 1951
Inactivated on 14 March 1951

=== Assignments ===
441st Troop Carrier Group

- 61 Troop Carrier Wing, 1 August 1943
- I Troop Carrier Command, 18 January 1944
- 50th Troop Carrier Wing, 17 March 1944
- IX Air Force Service Command, 18 May 1945 (attached to Supreme Headquarters, Allied Expeditionary Forces, 20 May – 10 August 1945)
- 302d Transport Wing, 11 August 1945
- 51st Troop Carrier Wing (European Air Transport Service [Provisional]), 1 October 1945 – 30 September 1946
- 441st Troop Carrier Wing, 27 June 1949 – 14 March 1951

441st Troop Carrier Wing

- Tenth Air Force, 27 June 1949 – 14 March 1951

=== Components ===
441st Troop Carrier Group

- 32d Troop Carrier Squadron, attached September 1945, assigned December 1945 – 30 September 1946
- 61st Troop Carrier Squadron, attached October 1945, assigned December 1945 – 30 September 1946
- 99th Troop Carrier Squadron, 1 August 1943 – 27 August 1945, 27 June 1949 – 14 March 1951
- 100th Troop Carrier Squadron, 1 August 1943 – 15 February 1946, 27 June 1949 – 14 March 1951
- 301st Troop Carrier Squadron, 1 August 1943 – 18 May 1945, August 1945 – 15 Feb 1946, 27 June 1949 – 14 March 1951
- 302d Troop Carrier Squadron, 1 August 1943 – 15 May 1945, 27 June 1949 – 14 March 1951
- 306th Troop Carrier Squadron, c. 5 January 1946 – 30 September 1946

441st Troop Carrier Wing

- 441st Air Base Group, 27 June 1949 – 14 March 1951
- 441st Maintenance and Supply Group, 27 June 1949 – 14 March 1951
- 441st Medical Group, 27 June 1949 – 14 March 1951
- 441st Troop Carrier Group, 27 June 1949 – 14 March 1951
- 441st Finance Disbursing Unit, 27 June 1949 – 1 November 1949

=== Stations ===
- Sedalia Army Air Field, Missouri, 1 August 1943
- Camp Mackall, North Carolina, 18 January 1944
- Baer Field, Indiana, 22–29 February 1944
- RAF Langar (AAF-490), England, 17 March 1944
- RAF Merryfield (AAF-464), England, 25 April 1944
- Villeneuve-Vertus Airfield (A-63), France, 8 September 1944
- Saint Marceau Airfield (A-43), France, 2 October 1944
- Dreux/Vernouillet Airfield (A-41), France, 3 November 1944
- Frankfurt Eschborn Air Base, Germany, 12 August 1945 – 30 September 1946
- Chicago-Orchard Airport (later O'Hare International Airport, Illinois, 27 June 1949 – 14 March 1951 (wing and group)

=== Aircraft flown ===
- Douglas C-47 Skytrain, 1943–1946
- Curtiss C-46 Commando, 1949–1951
