= Saint-Marceau =

Saint-Marceau may refer to the following places in France:

- Saint-Marceau, Ardennes, a commune in the Ardennes department
- Saint-Marceau, Sarthe, a commune in the Sarthe department
  - Saint Marceau Airfield, an abandoned World War II military airfield
