= 31st Troop Carrier Squadron =

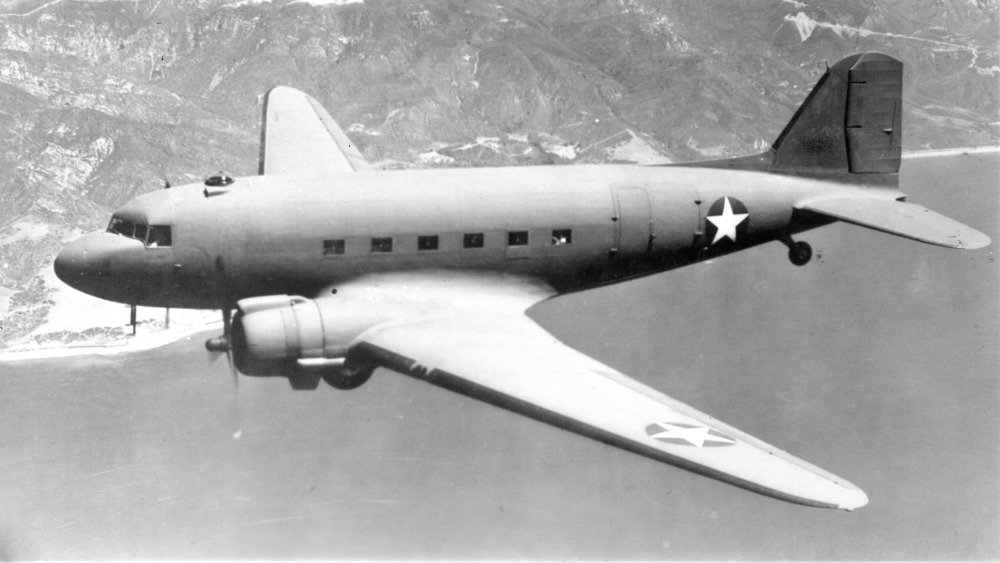
- Douglas C-47 Skytrain
- Active: 1942–1944
- Branch: United States Air Force
- Role: Airlift training

Insignia
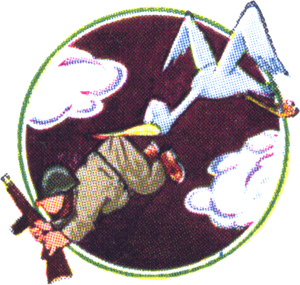
- 31st Troop Carrier Squadron emblem (Note: Approved 7 December 1943.)

The 31st Troop Carrier Squadron is a disbanded United States Air Force unit. It was established in January 1942 as the 31st Transport Squadron and served as a training unit for I Troop Carrier Command until disbanding in a general reorganization of Army Air Forces training units in 1944.

== History ==
=== World War II ===
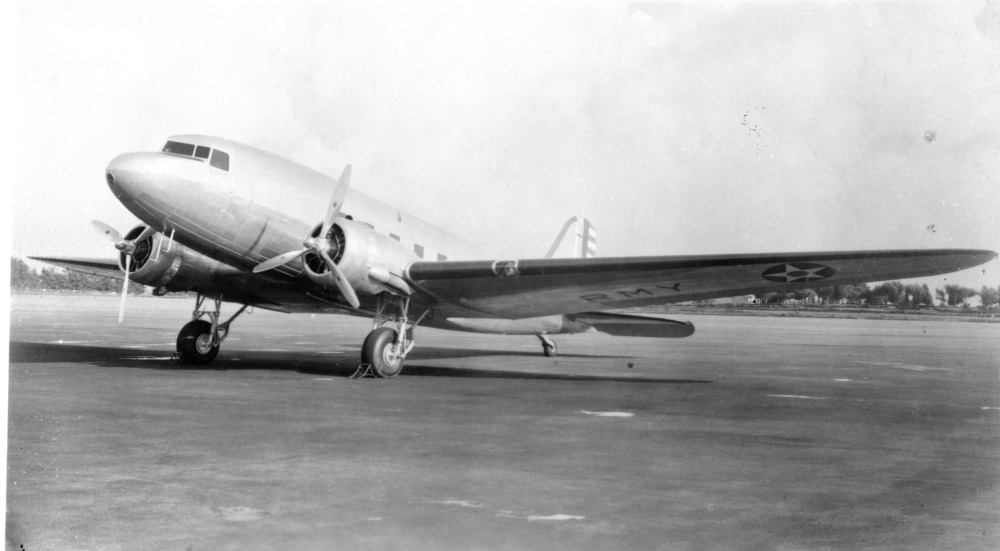
Douglas C-49

The squadron was first activated at Drew Field, Florida on 2 March 1942 as one of the three original squadrons of the 314th Transport Group. In June 1942, the squadron moved to Camp Williams Army Air Field, Wisconsin. Shortly before its move, it was assigned to the 89th Transport Group, which moved to Camp Williams from Harding Field, Louisiana. It was equipped with a variety of Douglas DC-3 airliners that had been impressed into military service and designated C-49 or C-50 and with Douglas C-53 Skytroopers.

The squadron's initial mission was transition training for qualified pilots who had not flown the Douglas transports. In July 1942, the squadron was redesignated the 31st Troop Carrier Squadron, but its mission remained the same. The squadron moved its operations to Sedalia Army Air Field, Missouri in September 1942 and to Del Valle Airfield, Texas in December. In 1943, it standardized its equipment with the Douglas C-47 Skytrain replacing its previous mixture of Douglas transports.

By February 1944 most combat units had been activated and almost three-quarters of them had deployed overseas. With the exception of special programs, like forming Boeing B-29 Superfortress units, training "fillers" for existing units became more important. Reflecting this change, the squadron mission changed in March 1944, when it became a Replacement Training Unit (RTU). The RTU program used oversized units to train individual pilots and aircrews.

However, the Army Air Forces was finding that standard military units like the 31st, whose manning was based on relatively inflexible tables of organization were not well adapted to the training mission, even more so to the replacement mission. Accordingly, the Army Air Forces adopted a more functional system in which each base was organized into a separate numbered unit. The 89th Group, along with its operational squadrons and support units at what was now Bergstrom Field were disbanded and their personnel and equipment were transferred to the new 807th AAF Base Unit (Combat Crew Training School, Troop Carrier).

== Lineage ==
- Constituted as the 31st Transport Squadron on 28 January 1942

Activated on 2 March 1942
Redesignated 31st Troop Carrier Squadron on 4 July 1942
Disbanded on 14 April 1944

=== Assignments ===
- 314th Transport Group, 2 March 1942
- 89th Transport Group (later 89th Troop Carrier Group), 15 June 1942 – 14 April 1944

=== Stations ===
- Drew Field, Florida, 2 March 1942
- Camp Williams Army Air Field, Wisconsin, 23 June 1942
- Sedalia Army Air Field, Missouri, 10 September 1942
- Del Valle Airfield (later Bergstrom Field), 16 December 1942 – 14 April 1944

=== Aircraft ===
- Douglas DC-3 (as C-49, C-50 and C-53), 1942–1943
- Douglas C-47 Skytrain, 1943–1944

=== Campaign ===
Campaign Streamer	Campaign	Dates	Notes
	American Theater without inscription	2 March 1942 – 14 April 1944	31st Transport Squadron (later 31st Troop Carrier Squadron)
