= 86th Airlift Squadron =

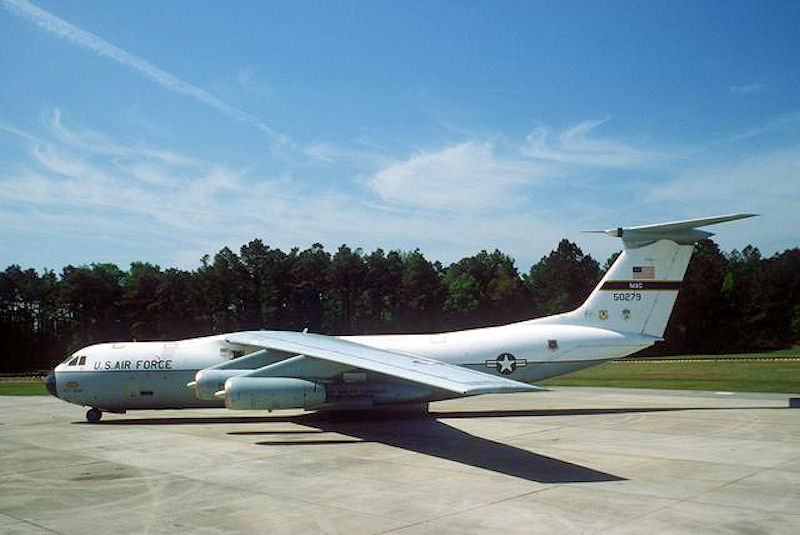
- Squadron C-141A Starlifter (Note: Aircraft is Lockheed C-141A Starlifter, serial 65-0279.)
- Active: 1943–1945; 1952–1955; 1963–1993
- Country: United States
- Branch: United States Air Force
- Role: Airlift
- Motto: Versatile Dependable
- Engagements: European Theater
- Decorations: Air Force Outstanding Unit Award; Vietnamese Gallantry Cross with Palm

Insignia
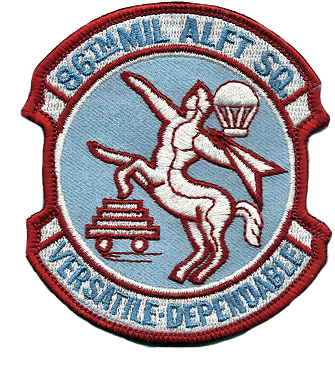
- 86th Airlift Squadron emblem

The 86th Airlift Squadron is an inactive United States Air Force unit. Its last assignment was to the 60th Air Mobility Wing at Travis Air Force Base, California, where it was inactivated on 1 November 1993.

== History ==
=== World War II ===
The group was first activated in the spring of 1943 as the 86th Transport Squadron, one of the original squadrons of the 27th Air Transport Group' at RAF Hendon, England to provide air transportation for Eighth Air Force. The 27th group was activated to give a formal organization to several airlift operations that were already serving VIII Air Force Service Command. One of these, located at was a passenger and freight operation at RAF Hendon. The Hendon operation became the 86th Transport Squadron. In the fall of 1944, the group and its squadrons moved to Le Bourget Airport, near Paris, where the 86th continued its operations through V-E Day.

I July 1945, the squadron returned to the United States, where it served as a transport squadron for I Troop Carrier Command until it was inactivated in November 1945.

=== Cold War ===
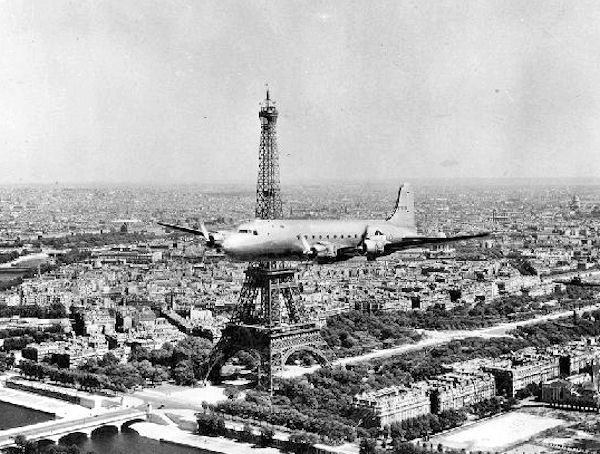
MATS C-54 over Paris in the early 1950s

The squadron was reconstituted in June 1952 as the 86th Air Transport Squadron and activated as part of Military Air Transport Service (MATS)' 1602d Air Transport Wing in West Germany in July. It provided air transport between USAF bases in Europe until 1954, when it moved to Charleston Air Force Base, South Carolina in 1955, where it provided airlift until it was inactivated in 1955.

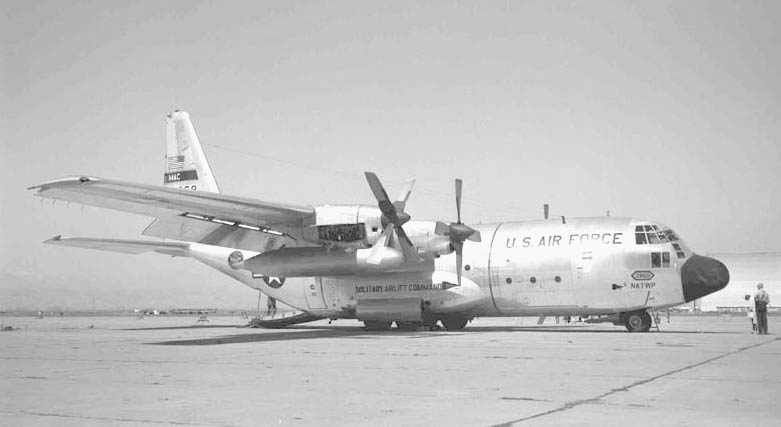
MAC C-130E at Moffett Field

The squadron was reactivated in January 1963 as a Lockheed C-130 Hercules squadron at Travis Air Force Base, California. The squadron received its first C-130E in April. It flew long-distance flights from Travis to Hawaii, Guam, Vietnam, Thailand, Japan and the Philippines. It upgraded to Lockheed C-141 Starlifter jet transports in 1967 and usually flew cargo and personnel to and from Travis to aerial ports in South Vietnam during the Vietnam War.

After the US withdrawal from Indochina in 1975, it flew Lockheed C-141 Starlifters on a worldwide basis. In late 1991 the unit was redesignated the 86th Airlift Squadron. The 86th was inactivated in 1993 and its mission, personnel and equipment were transferred to the 20th Airlift Squadron.

== Lineage ==
- Constituted as the 86th Transport Squadron (Cargo & Mail)

Activated on 15 April 1943

- Disbanded on 15 November 1945
- Reconstituted as the 86th Air Transport Squadron, Medium on 20 June 1952

Activated on 20 July 1952

- Redesignated 86th Air Transport Squadron, Medium (Augmented) on 1 December 1952
- Redesignated 86th Air Transport Squadron, Medium on 1 May 1954
- Inactivated on 1 July 1955

Redesignated the 86th Air Transport Squadron, Heavy and activated on 21 December 1962 (not organized)
Organized on 8 January 1963
Redesignated the 86th Military Airlift Squadron on 8 January 1966
Redesignated the 86th Airlift Squadron on 1 November 1991
Inactivated on 1 November 1993

=== Assignments ===
- 27th Air Transport Group, 15 April 1943
- I Troop Carrier Command, August 1945
- IX Troop Carrier Command, 4 – 15 November 1945
- 1602d Air Transport Wing, 20 July 1952
- 1608th Air Transport Group, 20 May 1954 − 1 July 1955
- 1501st Air Transport Wing, 8 January 1963
- 60th Military Airlift Wing, 8 January 1966
- 60th Military Airlift Group, 6 March 1978
- 60th Military Airlift Wing, 15 February 1979
- 60th Operations Group, 1 October 1992 – 1 November 1993

=== Stations ===
- RAF Hendon, England, 15 April 1943
- RAF Heston, England, January 1944
- Le Bourget Airport, France, October 1944
- Villacoublay Airfield, France, March 1945
- Le Havre-Octeville Airport, July 1945 – July 1945
- New York Port of Embarkation, New York, August 1945
- Baer Field, Indiana, 13 August 1945 – 15 November 1945
- Rhein-Main Air Base, West Germany, 20 July 1952
- Charleston Air Force Base, South Carolina, 20 May 1954 − 1 July 1955
- Travis Air Force Base, California, 8 January 1963 – 1 November 1993

=== Aircraft ===
- Douglas C-47 Skytrain, 1943–1945
- Douglas C-54 Skymaster, 1952–1955
- Lockheed C-130 Hercules, 1963–1966
- Lockheed C-141 Starlifter, 1967–1993

=== Awards and campaigns ===
Award streamer	Award	Dates	Notes
	Air Force Outstanding Unit Award	1 July 1965-30 June 1966	86th Air Transport Squadron (later 86th Military Airlift Squadron)
	Air Force Outstanding Unit Award	1 July 1966-30 June 1967	86th Military Airlift Squadron
	Air Force Outstanding Unit Award	1 July 1967-30 June 1968	86th Military Airlift Squadron
	Air Force Outstanding Unit Award	1 July 1974-30 June 1975	86th Military Airlift Squadron
	Vietnamese Gallantry Cross with Palm	1 April 1966-28 January 1973	86th Military Airlift Squadron

Campaign Streamer	Campaign	Dates	Notes
	Northern France	25 July 1944 – 14 September 1944	86th Transport Squadron
	Ardennes-Alsace	16 December 1944 – 25 January 1945	86th Transport Squadron
