= 24th Transport Squadron =

24th Transport Squadron may refer to:

- The 24th Fighter-Bomber Squadron, designated the 24th Transport Squadron (later 24th Troop Carrier Squadron) from February to July 1942
- The 924th Air Refueling Squadron, designated the 24th Transport Squadron (earlier 24th Ferrying Squadron) from March to October 9143
