= Hugh J. Knerr =

United States military general (1887–1971)

Hugh Johnston Knerr
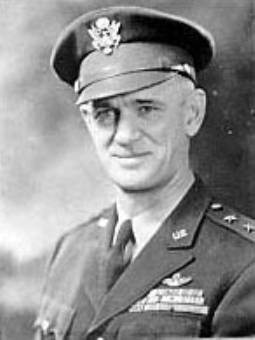
- Born: Hugh Johnston Knerr; May 30, 1887; Fairfield, Iowa
- Died: October 26, 1971 (aged 84)
- Burial place: Arlington National Cemetery
- Military career
- Allegiance: United States
- Branch: United States Navy United States Air Force
- Service years: 1908–1911 (Navy); 1911–1939 (Air Force); 1942–1949 (Air Force)
- Rank: Major general
- Conflicts: World War I World War II
- Awards: Distinguished Service Medal; Legion of Merit; Bronze Star Medal

Hugh Johnston Knerr (May 30, 1887 – October 26, 1971) was a major general in the United States Air Force.

== Biography ==
Knerr was born on May 30, 1887, in Fairfield, Iowa. He died on October 26, 1971, and is buried at Arlington National Cemetery.

== Career ==
Knerr graduated from the United States Naval Academy on June 5, 1908 and served as an ensign in the United States Navy until 1911. He commissioned as a second lieutenant in the Coast Artillery Corps of the United States Army on September 28, 1911. After seven years service in which he reached the rank of captain, he was detailed to the Aviation Section, U.S. Signal Corps in January 1918 during World War I.

For six months, Knerr served as an engineering officer at flying training fields in Tennessee and Florida. He was sent to Hawaii in July 1918, where he was Aviation Officer to the Hawaiian Department and commanding officer of Luke Field until July 1919, when he returned to the Coast Artillery during the demobilization following the war.

In February 1922 he was detailed again to the Air Service in the grade of major. In February 1924 he formally transferred to the Air Service to qualify for command of the 88th Observation Squadron at Wilbur Wright Field, Ohio. In 1926, the Air Service became the Air Corps. In September 1927, Knerr was appointed to command its sole bombardment unit, the 2nd Bombardment Group, at Langley Field, Virginia, where he had a profound influence on the development of equipment, and tactics that led to the development of strategic bombardment doctrine.

Knerr followed Lt. Col. Henry H. Arnold as Chief, Field Service Section, Air Corps Materiel Division, at Wright Field, Ohio, in 1932. Arnold called upon his expertise in both engineering and bomber operations, to be his executive officer in July 1934 of a squadron-sized flight from Bolling Field to Alaska and back, using the new Martin B-10 bomber. Knerr supervised the preparation of the bombers at nearby Patterson Field and acted as Arnold's second-in-command during the flight. The flight won the MacKay Trophy for that year, in large part as a result of Knerr's judgment in technical decisions. Arnold, as leader of the flight, won acclaim almost to the exclusion of the other participants, and received an award of the Distinguished Flying Cross. However, despite Arnold's recommendations, that all participants in the flight be recognized with the decoration, only Arnold received it, causing a permanent rift between the two and Knerr's permanent embitterment. Knerr led a faction opposing Arnold's appointment to Chief of Air Corps in September 1938.

On March 2, 1935, Knerr received an assignment promotion (temporary), to colonel when he was made chief of staff of the newly activated General Headquarters Air Force under Maj. Gen. Frank M. Andrews. After three tumultuous years of political in-fighting with the War Department General Staff, over doctrine and the development of the Boeing B-17 Flying Fortress, Andrews' staff was purged of its members by Army Chief of Staff Gen. Malin Craig in February 1938. Knerr was sent to Fort Sam Houston, San Antonio, Texas, as Air Officer, Eighth Corps Area, where Billy Mitchell (whose theories on air warfare were the basis for the doctrine of strategic bombardment and an Air Force separate from the Army advocated by Knerr) had been exiled 13 years earlier. A stress-induced recurrence of sciatica linked to a crash in 1923 resulted in forced hospitalization for the remainder of 1938. In January 1939, Knerr was compelled to appear before the Army's retirement board, where its psychiatrist characterized the condition as "psychosomatic." He was retired medically in March 1939. At the same time Andrews, whose advocacy of strategic bombardment and an independent Air Force were as strong as Knerr's, was not reappointed to a second tour as commanding general of GHQ Air Force. Reduced to his permanent rank of colonel, Andrews followed Knerr as Air Officer in San Antonio.

In private life, Knerr went to work for the Sperry Corporation Research Laboratories, wrote numerous magazine articles advocating his positions, and conducted a letter-writing campaign against Arnold between 1939 and 1941. In the meantime, he was cleared by physicians at Walter Reed Army Hospital of the previous medical conclusions of the retirement board. Andrews, again a general and commander of the Panama Canal Air Force, asked for Knerr's recall to active duty and assignment to him as his maintenance commander. Arnold, now Chief of the Army Air Forces, was initially reluctant, because of the many public and private criticisms Knerr had made of him, but agreed to the return to active duty in August 1941. However, the Army's Surgeon General, referring to the supposed psychological reasons for his retirement, rejected the reinstatement on medical grounds.

After the United States entered World War II, Knerr was called back to active duty as a colonel in July 1942. He served as deputy commander of the Air Service Command at Patterson AAB until July 1943, when he was promoted to brigadier general and sent to England on Arnold's recommendation. At that time, the Combined Bomber Offensive was being hindered by a low rate of aircraft availability because of maintenance and supply problems, and Knerr was sent to re-organize the system. He acted as both Deputy Commanding General and Commanding General of the VIII Service Command, Eighth Air Force; then from January 1945 as Commander, Air Technical Service Command Europe, which was responsible for all support to both the Eighth and Ninth Air Forces. Additionally, he was promoted to major general in March 1944, and after the invasion of Europe in June 1944, held the position of Deputy Commander for Administration, U.S. Strategic Air Forces, Europe in addition to his other duties.

In June 1945, he returned to Wright Field to command the Army Air Forces' Air Technical Service Command until February 1946. Following the war, he transferred to the newly formed Air Force. Later assignments included serving as a special assistant to U.S. Secretary of the Air Force Stuart Symington and Inspector General of the Air Force. His retirement was effective as of November 1, 1949.

Awards he received include the Distinguished Service Medal, the Legion of Merit, and the Bronze Star Medal.

== Effective dates of promotion ==
Source: Knerr effectively skipped the rank of Lt. Col.

Insignia	Rank	Date
	Major general	March 2, 1944
	Brigadier general	July 1, 1943
	Colonel	March 2, 1935 (temporary)
	Lieutenant colonel	August 1, 1935 (permanent)
	Major	July 1, 1920
	Captain	May 15, 1917
	First lieutenant	July 1, 1916
	Second lieutenant	June 5, 1908
