= VIII Air Force Service Command =

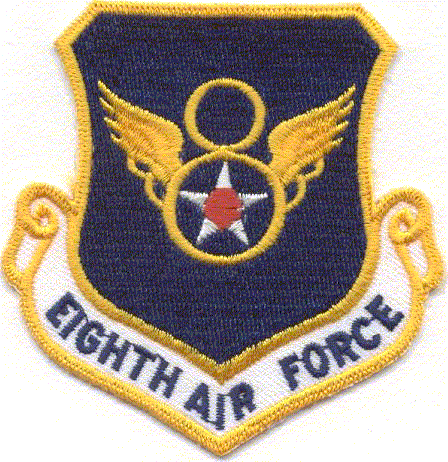
- Shield of the Eighth Air Force
- Country: United States of America
- Branch: Army Air Forces
- Engagements: World War II

VIII Air Force Service Command (originally VIII Air Service Command) was a logistical support formation of the United States Army Air Forces, supporting the Eighth Air Force in the United Kingdom.

== Organization ==
Established in 1942, along with the VIII bomber, fighter and air support commands that filled out the Eighth Air Force, it was commanded by General Henry J. F. Miller. In July 1942, General Hugh J. Knerr assumed the duties of deputy commander. On 24 October 1943, Knerr became commanding general when Gen. Miller was transferred to command of the IX Air Force Service Command.

While deputy commander, Knerr had pressed for a reorganization of the Eighth Air Force that would place logistics on the same level with combat operations. He was appointed A-4 of the Eighth Air Force just days before assuming command of VIII Air Force Service Command, which thus combined in one person the chief air service offices of the entire Eighth Air Force. By December 1943 the service command had absorbed the personnel and functions of A-4 to become the sole logistical agency entitled to act in the name of the commanding general, Eighth Air Force.

The VIII Air Force Service Command's headquarters organized the policies, training and logistics of a Base Air Depot Area (BADA), Advanced Air Depot Area (AADA) and Tactical Air Depot Area (TADA). With the expansion of the Ninth Air Force and its BADA and AADA in England, the VIII Air Force Service Command focused more on policy as it integrated with the highest air headquarters to function as a de facto air service command for the European theater, operating chiefly as a staff agency for the entire theater.

== Units ==
Among the units in the VIII Air Force Service Command was the 7th Photographic Group (July 1943-August 1944), and the 27th Air Transport Group (until 1 September 1944).

After the command moved to the Pacific, 22 Air Depot Group arrived at Naha, Okinawa, on 16 August 1945, and remained there, being redesignated 22 Air Depot on 12 July 1946, passing from VIII AFSC to the Okinawa Air Depot by October 1945.
