= Saint-Marceau, Sarthe =

Saint-Marceau
- Commune
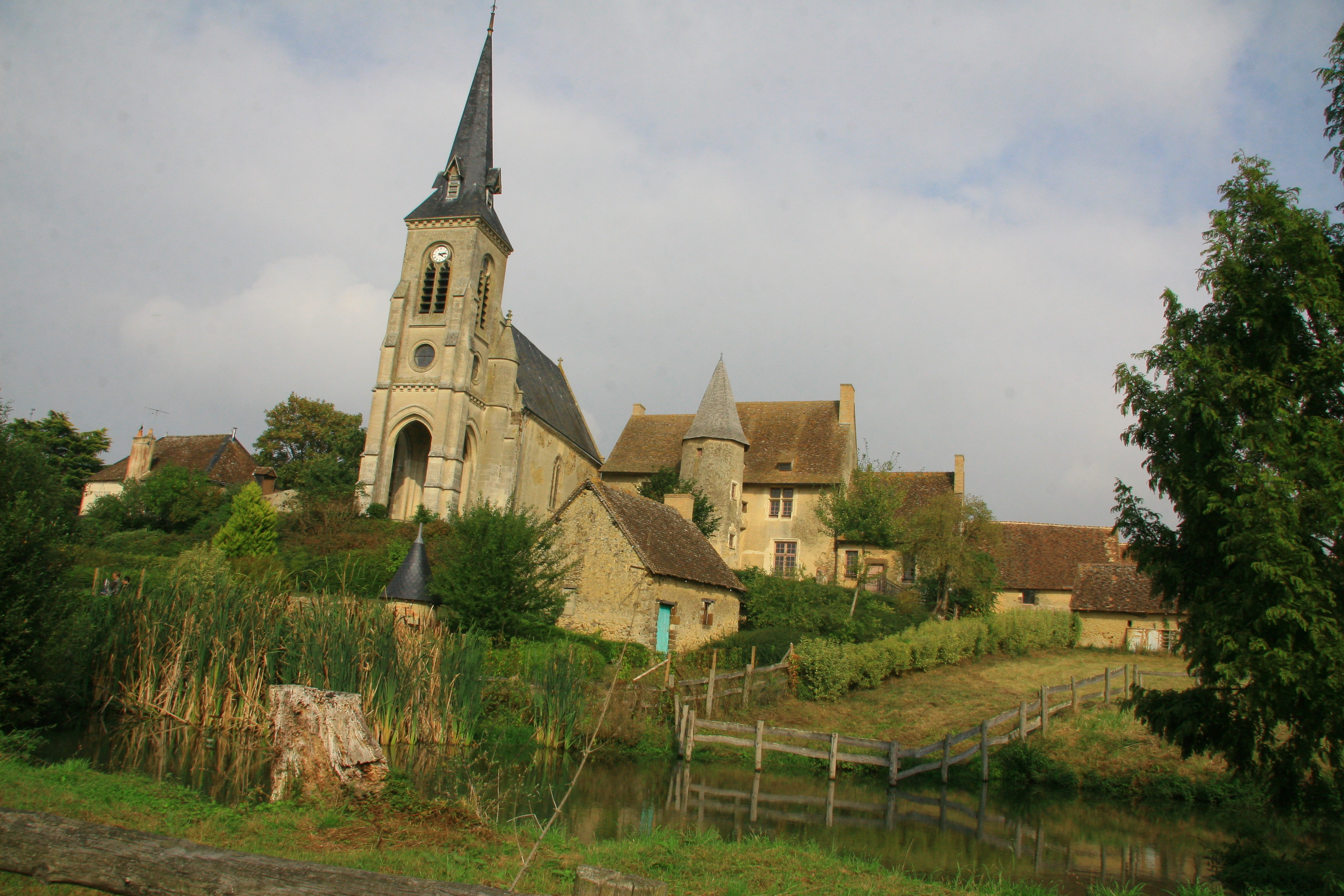
- The chapel of Saint Julien, in Saint Marceau
- Location of Saint-Marceau
- Location within France Location within Pays de la Loire
- Coordinates: 48°10′47″N 0°07′41″E
- Country: France
- Region: Pays de la Loire
- Department: Sarthe
- Arrondissement: Mamers
- Canton: Sillé-le-Guillaume
- Intercommunality: Haute Sarthe Alpes Mancelles

Government
  - Mayor (2020–2026): Agnès Dubois-Schmitt
- Area^{1}: 8.91 km^{2} (3.44 sq mi)
- Highest elevation: 107 m (351 ft)
- Lowest elevation: 52 m (171 ft)
- Population (2023): 530
  - Density: 59/km^{2} (150/sq mi)
- Demonym(s): Marcelin, Marceline
- Time zone: UTC+01:00 (CET)
  - Summer (DST): UTC+02:00 (CEST)
- INSEE/Postal code: 72297 /72170
- ^{1} French Land Register data, which excludes lakes, ponds, glaciers > 1 km^{2} (0.386 sq mi or 247 acres) and river estuaries.

Saint-Marceau (French pronunciation: [sɛ̃ maʁso]) is a commune in the Sarthe department in the region of Pays de la Loire in north-western France.

== World War II ==
After the liberation of the area by Allied Forces in August 1944, engineers of the Ninth Air Force IX Engineering Command began construction of a combat Advanced Landing Ground outside of the town. Declared operational on 31 August, the airfield was designated as "A-43". It was used by several combat units until November 1944 when the units moved to Central France and the airfield was closed.

== See also ==
- Communes of the Sarthe department
