= 306th Expeditionary Airlift Squadron =

- Active: 1943-1946; 1949-1951; 2011-2012; 2019-Present
- Country: United States
- Branch: United States Air Force
- Role: Airlift
- Part of: Air Mobility Command
- Mottos: Pride, Integrity, Excellence
- Decorations: Distinguished Unit Citation

Insignia
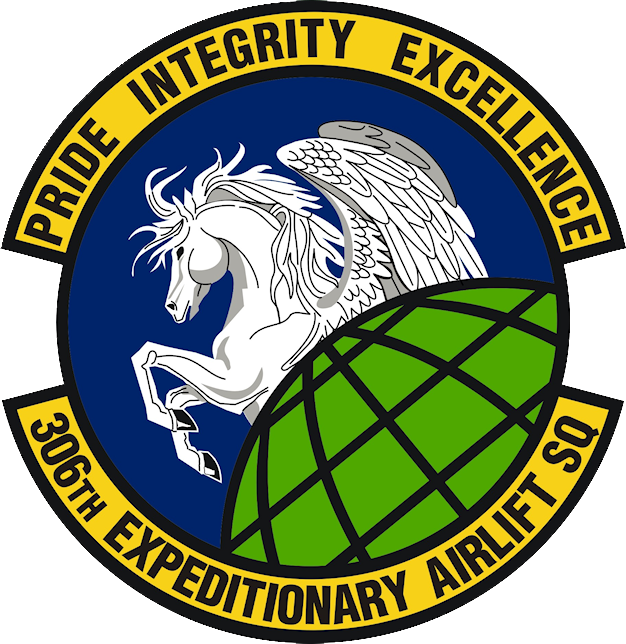
- 306th Expeditionary Airlift Squadron emblem

The 306th Expeditionary Airlift Squadron was a provisional United States Air Force unit. It was assigned to Air Mobility Command, and operated from Joint Base Andrews, Maryland.

== Mission ==
Attached to the 89th Airlift Wing at Joint Base Andrews, Maryland, the squadron operates with approximately 60 maintenance and 20 operations personnel in support of four to ten transient C-17 Globemaster III aircrew and aircraft. The squadron is traditionally activated in support of a presidential re-election campaign with a mission of presidential airlift logistical support. Aircraft and personnel are prepositioned to support an expected surge in airlift requirements while seeking to minimize the overall cost for airlift.

The most recent activation of the squadron was 1 November 2019 and it was inactivated on 5 November 2020.

== History ==
=== World War II ===
The squadron was first activated with Douglas C-47 Skytrains in September 1943 as the 306th Troop Carrier Squadron at Sedalia Army Air Field, Missouri and trained under I Troop Carrier Command. It trained in various parts of the eastern United States until early 1944. The unit then deployed to England, where it became part of IX Troop Carrier Command.

The squadron prepared for the invasion of Nazi-occupied Europe. It began operations by dropping paratroops of the 101st Airborne Division in Normandy on D-Day (6 June 1944) and releasing gliders with reinforcements on the following day. The unit received a Distinguished Unit Citation and a French citation for these missions. After the Normandy invasion the squadron ferried supplies in the United Kingdom.

After moving to France in September, the unit dropped paratroops of the 82nd Airborne Division near Nijmegen and towed gliders carrying reinforcements during Operation Market Garden, the airborne attack on the Netherlands. In December, it participated in the Battle of the Bulge by releasing gliders with supplies for the 101st Airborne Division near Bastogne.

When the Allies made the air assault across the Rhine River in March 1945, each aircraft towed two gliders with troops of the 17th Airborne Division and released them near Wesel. The squadron also hauled food, clothing, medicine, gasoline, ordnance equipment, and other supplies to the front lines and evacuated patients to rear zone hospitals. It converted from C-47s to Curtiss C-46 Commandos and used the new aircraft to transport displaced persons from Germany to France and Belgium after V-E Day. It was inactivated in Germany in September 1946.

=== Air Force reserve operations ===
Postwar, the squadron was activated in the Air Force reserve in 1949 at Fairfax Field, Kansas. At Fairfax, it again operated C-46 Commandos. The squadron was called to active duty during the Korean War in 1951, and its aircraft and personnel were used as fillers other units and the squadron was inactivated.

=== Operations and decorations ===
- Combat Operations. The unit participated in airborne assaults on Normandy during Operation Neptune in June 1944; in Southern France during Operation Dragoon; over the Netherlands during Operation Market in September 1944; and in Germany during Operation Varsity in March 1945.
- Campaigns. World War II: Rome-Arno; Southern France; Normandy; Northern France; Rhineland; Central Europe.
- Decorations. Distinguished Unit Citation: France, [6-7] Jun 1944

== Lineage ==
- Constituted as the 306th Troop Carrier Squadron on 25 May 1943

Activated on 1 September 1943
Inactivated on 30 September 1946

- Redesignated 306th Troop Carrier Squadron, Medium on 10 May 1949

Activated in the reserve on 27 June 1949
Ordered to active service on 10 March 1951
Inactivated on 12 March 1951

- Redesignated 306th Expeditionary Airlift Squadron and converted to provisional status on 27 March 2003.
- Inactivated on 5 November 2020

=== Assignments ===
- 442d Troop Carrier Group, 1 September 1943 - 30 September 1946
- 442d Troop Carrier Group, 27 June 1949 - 12 March 1951
- Air Mobility Command to activate or inactivate at any time after 27 March 2003.

Attached to 89th Airlift Wing, 1 December 2011 - c. November 2012

=== Stations ===
- Sedalia Army Air Field, Missouri, 1 September 1943
- Alliance Army Air Field, Nebraska, 15 December 1943
- Pope Field, North Carolina, 26 January 1944
- Baer Field, Indiana, 2–8 March 1944
- RAF Fulbeck (AAF-488), England, 27 March 1944
- RAF Weston Zoyland (AAF-447), England, 12 June 1944

Operated from Follonica Airfield, Italy, 18 July - 24 August 1944

- Saint-André-de-l'Eure Airport (B-24), France, 5 November 1944

Operated from Metz Airfield (Y-34), France, 21 April -o 15 May and 26 May - 10 September 1945

- AAF Station Munich, Germany, September 1945 - 30 September 1946
- Fairfax Field, Kansas, 27 Jun 1949
- Olathe Naval Air Station, Kansas, 27 May 1950 - 12 March 1951
- New Castle Air National Guard Base, Delaware, 1 December 2011 – c. November 2012

=== Aircraft ===
- Douglas C-47 Skytrain, 1943-1946; 1949-1950
- Waco CG-4A Glider, 1944-1945
- Curtiss C-46|C/TC-46 Commando, 1949, 1950-1951
- C-17 Globemaster III, 2012, 2020
