= 89th Operations Group =

Part of US Air Force 89th Airlift Wing operating executive transport

89th Operations Group

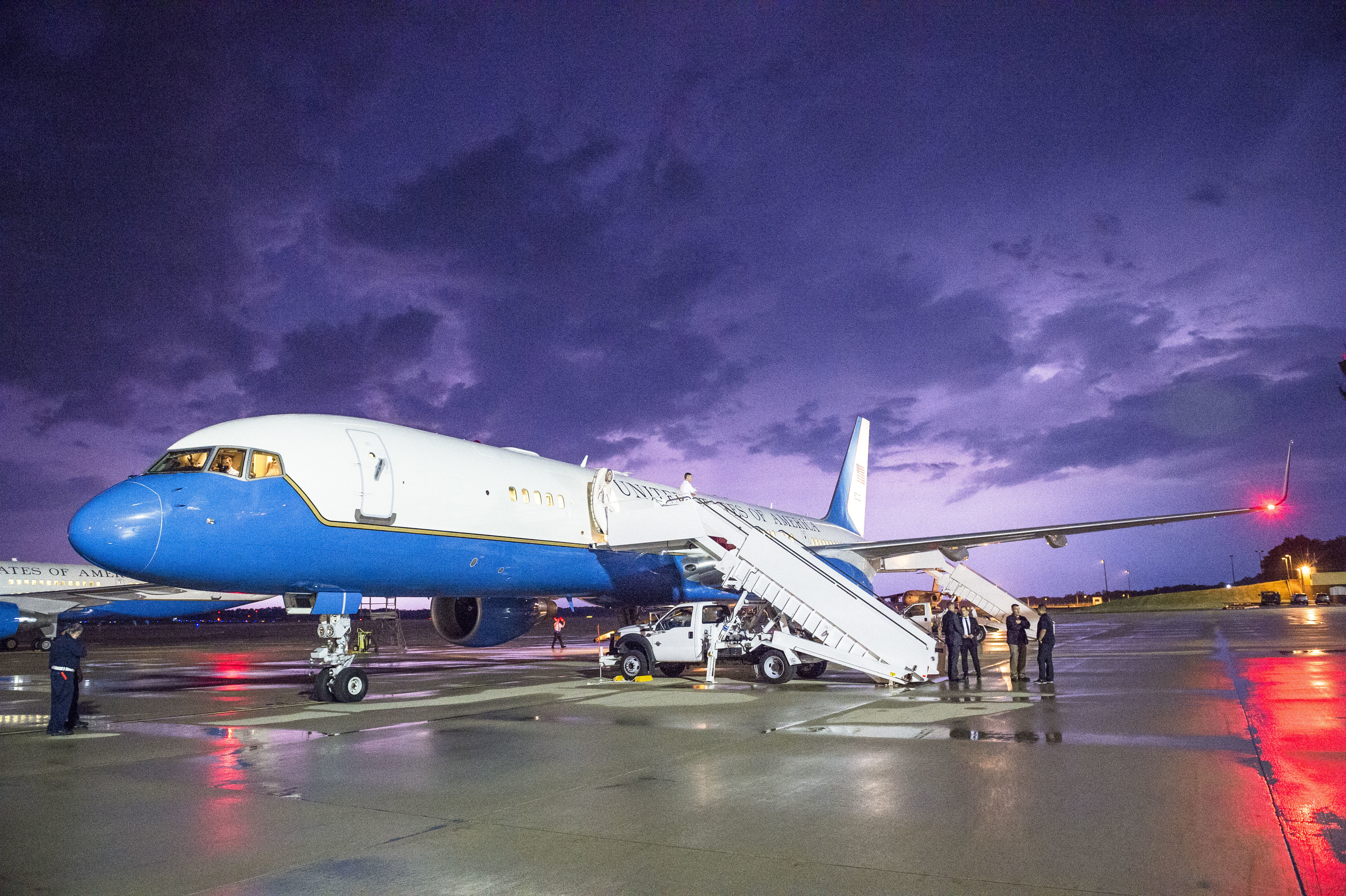
- A Boeing C-32A, one of the types operated by the group, at Joint Base Andrews in May 2015
- Active: 1942–1944; 1949–1951; 1952–1957; 1991–present
- Country: United States
- Branch: United States Air Force
- Part of: Air Mobility Command: Eighteenth Air Force; 89th Airlift Wing

Insignia
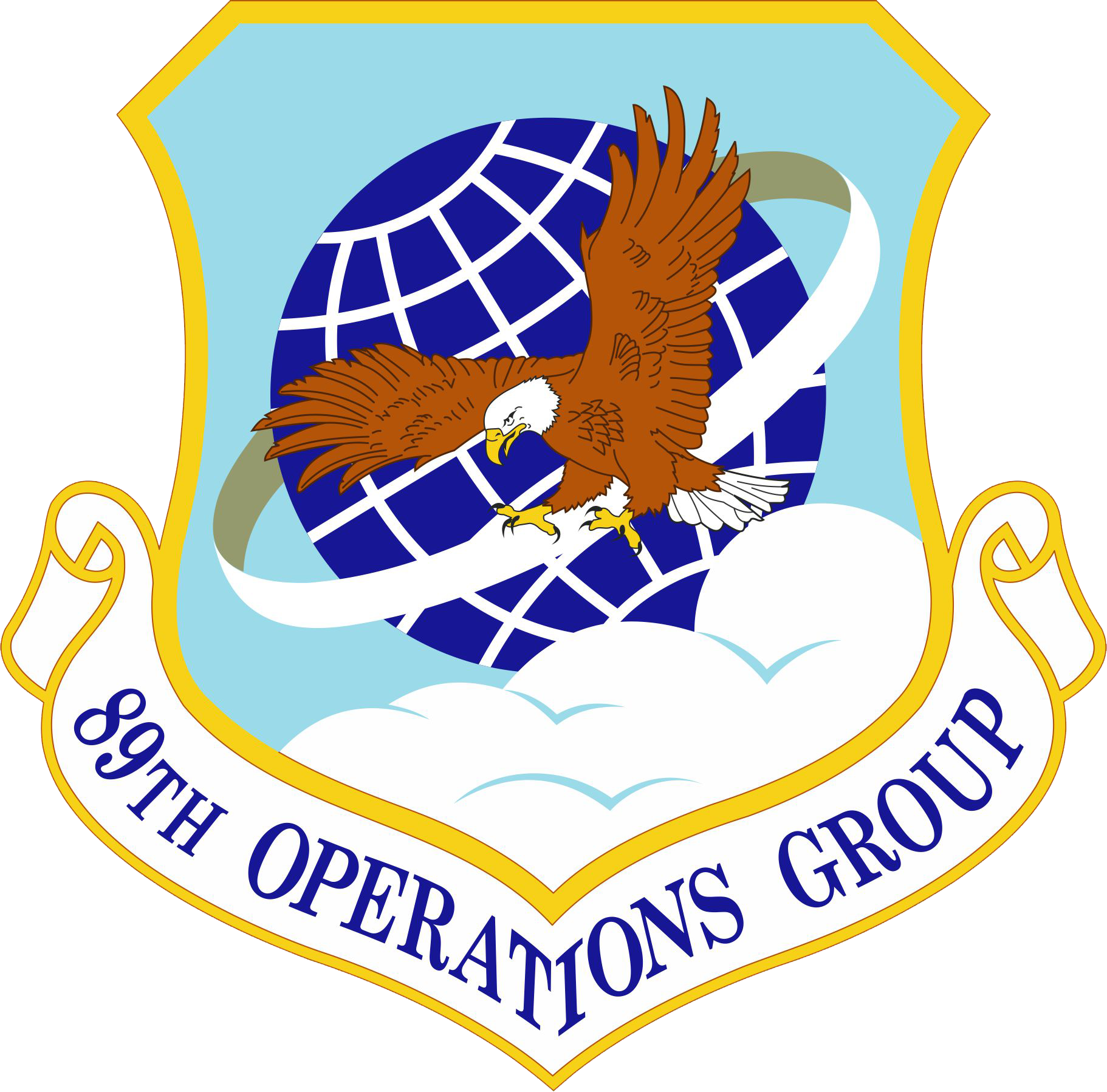
- 89th Operations Group emblem

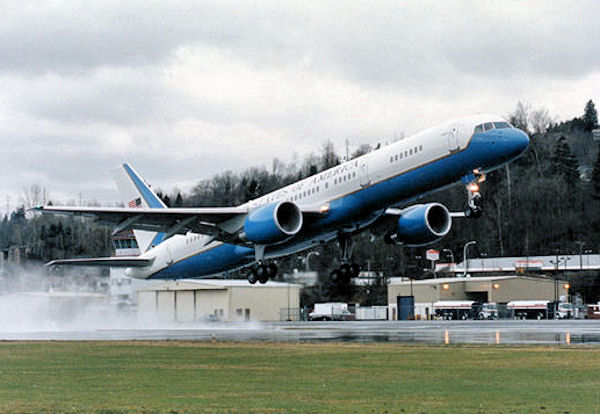
A C-32, a specially configured version of the Boeing 757-200 commercial intercontinental airliner

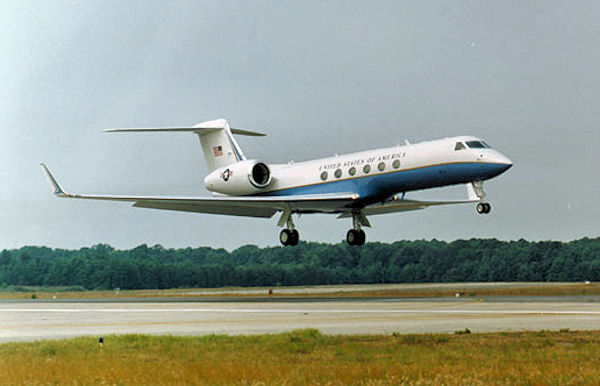
C-37A Gulfstream V

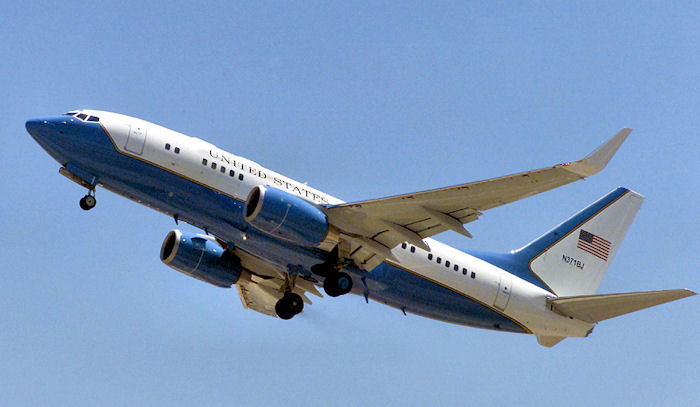
The C-40 B/C (Boeing 737 BBJ)

The 89th Operations Group (89 OG) is one of the operational flying and support components of the United States Air Force 89th Airlift Wing, utilizing C-37A and B, C-32, and C-40 aircraft. It is stationed at Joint Base Andrews, Maryland since 1991.

The 89 OG provides Special Air Mission (SAM) transport to high U.S. government officials and foreign dignitaries as needed. The group provided SAM transport to the President of the United States until 20 February 2001 when that mission was moved to the Presidential Airlift Group.

Its World War II predecessor unit, the 89th Troop Carrier Group was a First Air Force training unit providing transition training for pilots, 1942–1944, then briefly became a replacement training unit (RTU) during 1944 when it was inactivated. It trained in the Air Force Reserve for troop carrier operations, June 1949-May 1951, when it was briefly called into active service in May 1951 to provide personnel to other units during the Korean War. Reactivated in 1952 and trained in the Reserve for Tactical Air Command fighter-bomber operations until being inactivated in 1957.

== Historical summary of organizational changes ==
=== Lineage ===
- Established as 89th Transport Group on 19 January 1942

Activated on 1 February 1942
Redesignated 89th Troop Carrier Group on 4 July 1942
Disestablished on 14 April 1944

- Reestablished, and redesignated 89th Troop Carrier Group, Medium, on 10 May 1949

Activated in the Reserve on 27 June 1949
Ordered to active service on 1 May 1951
Inactivated on 10 May 1951

- Redesignated 89th Fighter-Bomber Group on 26 May 1952

Activated in the Reserve on 14 June 1952
Inactivated on 16 November 1957

- Redesignated: 89th Tactical Fighter Group on 31 July 1985 (Remained inactive)
- Redesignated: 89th Operations Group on 1 July 1991

Activated on 12 July 1991.

=== Assignments ===
- Air Force Combat Command, 1 February 1942
- 50 Transport (later, 50 Troop Carrier) Wing, 30 April 1942
- 53 Troop Carrier Wing, 3 November 1942
- I Troop Carrier Command, 24 December 1942
- 61 Troop Carrier Wing, 26 February-14 April 1944
- 89th Troop Carrier Wing, Medium, 27 June 1949 – 10 May 1951
- 89th Fighter-Bomber Wing, 14 June 1952 – 16 November 1957
- 89th Airlift Wing, 12 July 1991-.

=== Components ===
- 1st Airlift Squadron: 12 July 1991 – present, C-32A & C-40B aircraft
- 99th Airlift Squadron, C-37A & C-37B aircraft
- 89th Operations Support Squadron: 12 Jul 1991 - present
- 89th Communications Squadron, 13 June 2025 - present
- 89th Expeditionary Operations Support Squadron: 7 Feb 2024-?
- 1st Helicopter Squadron: 12 July 1991–2006
- 24 Transport (later, 24 Troop Carrier; 24 Fighter-Bomber): 1 February 1942 – 14 April 1944; 27 June 1949 – 10 May 1951; 14 June 1952 – 16 November 1957
- 25 Transport (later, 25 Troop Carrier; 25 Fighter-Bomber): 1 February 1942 – 14 April 1944; 27 June 1949 – 10 May 1951; 14 June 1952 – 1 July 1957
- 26 Transport (later, 26 Troop Carrier; 26 Fighter-Bomber): 1 February 1942 – 14 April 1944; 27 June 1949 – 10 May 1951; 14 June 1952 – 16 November 1957
- 27 Transport: 1 February-15 June 1942
- 28 Transport: 1 February-19 May 1942
- 30 Transport (later, 30 Troop Carrier): 15 June 1942 – 14 April 1944; 27 June 1949 – 10 May 1951
- 31 Transport (later, 31 Troop Carrier): 15 June 1942 – 14 April 1944. 99 Airlift: 12 July 1991–present
- 457th Airlift Squadron: 1 April 1993 – 1 April 1995

=== Stations ===
- Daniel Field Airport, Georgia, 1 February 1942
- Harding Army Air Field, Louisiana, 8 March 1942
- Camp Williams, Wisconsin, 20 June 1942
- Sedalia Army Air Field, Missouri, 8 September 1942
- Del Valle (later, Bergstrom) Field, Texas, 14 December 1942 – 14 April 1944
- Laurence G. Hanscom Field, Massachusetts, 27 June 1949 – 10 May 1951; 14 June 1952 – 16 November 1957
- Andrews AFB, Maryland, 12 July 1991–present

=== Aircraft ===
- DC-3 (probably as military versions C-49, C-50, and C-53), 1942–1943
- C-47, 1943–1944; TC-47, 1955-195
- C-45, 1949–1950; 1955–1957
- C-46, 1949–1951; 1952, 1956–1957
- F-51, 1952–1954
- F-80, 1953–1957
- F-86, 1957
- C-119, 1957
- C-135, 1991–1992; VC-135, 1991–1992
- VC-137 (later, C-137), 1991–2001
- VC/C-9, 1991 – 2005
- UH-1, 1991–2006
- C-12, 1991–1993
- C-20, 1991–2018
- VC-25A, 1991–Present
- C-21, 1993–1997
- C-32, 1998–present
- C-37, 1998–present
- C-40, 2002–present
