= RAF Merryfield =

Former Royal Air Force station in Somerset, England

RAF Merryfield RAF Isle Abbots USAAF Station AAF-464
- Fivehead, Somerset in England
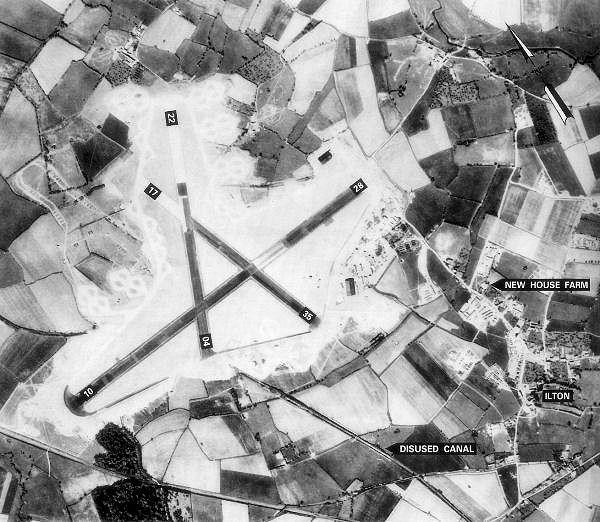
- Merryfield airfield in 1943, having just been turned over to the USAAF by the contractors, shown with the village of Ilton.

Site information
- Type: Royal Air Force station
- Code: HI, MF
- Owner: Air Ministry
- Operator: Royal Air Force; United States Army Air Forces
- Controlled by: RAF Army Cooperation Command 1943; RAF Fighter Command 1943-44 * No. 10 Group RAF; Ninth Air Force 1944; Air Defence of Great Britain 1944 * No. 10 Group RAF; RAF Transport Command 1944 * No. 47 Group RAF

Location
- Shown within Somerset
- Coordinates: 50.97°N 2.94°W

Site history
- Built: 1942/43
- Built by: John Laing & Son Ltd
- In use: April 1943 - 1971
- Battles/wars: European theatre of World War II; Cold War

Airfield information
- Elevation: 110 feet (34 m) AMSL
Runways
Direction	Length and surface
00/00	Concrete/Bitumen
00/00	Concrete/Bitumen
00/00	Concrete/Bitumen

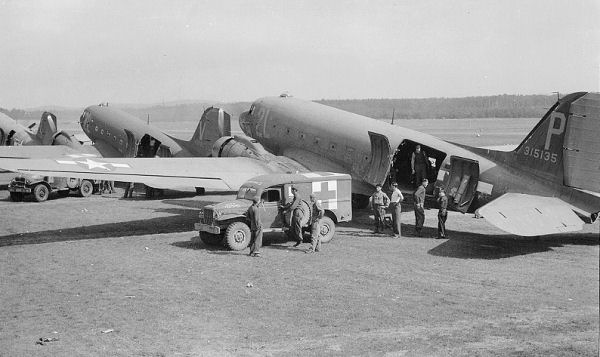
Douglas C-47A-80-DL Serial 43-15135 of the 302d TCS

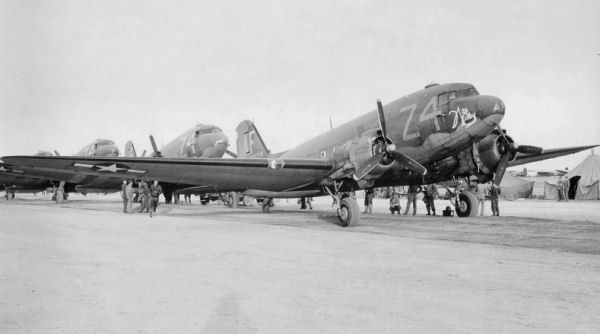
Douglas C-47A-25-DK Skytrain Serial 42-93708 of the 301st TCS

Royal Air Force Merryfield or more simply RAF Merryfield (also known as Isle Abbotts) is a former Royal Air Force station in the village of Ilton near Ilminster in southwest Somerset, England. The airfield is located approximately 7 miles (11 km) north of Chard, about 130 miles (210 km) southwest of London. It is now RNAS Merryfield and serves as a satellite to the larger RNAS Yeovilton; it is used mainly as a training facility for helicopter pilots.

== History ==
=== Site ===
The airfield was built on or near the historic estate of Merryfield (alias Merrifield, Murefeld, Merefeld, Muryfield, Merifield, Wadham's Castle, etc.), the former fortified manor house of which was situated about 1 mile west-north-west of the parish church of Ilton, and immediately south of the present airfield, and of which only a moated site remains, in the middle of farmland. The estate was the seat, from mediaeval times until 1609, of the Wadham family which founded Wadham College, Oxford in 1610, and whose monuments survive at the Church of St Mary, Ilminster. Today a large grade II listed 19th century mansion called Merryfield House is situated immediately south of St Peter's Church, Ilton.

=== Airfield ===
Opened in 1944, the airfield was used by both the Royal Air Force and United States Army Air Forces. During the Second World War it was used primarily as a transport airfield. After the war it was provided to the Royal Navy.

== Overview ==
Merryfield airfield was to be built to the Class A airfield standard for bomber use, with a set of three converging concrete runways for takeoffs and landings, optimally placed at 60-degree angles to each other in a triangular pattern. John Laing & Son Ltd was the main contractor. Work commenced late in 1942 and on 11 November the airfield was listed as one of 16 to be made available for the USAAF to meet the number of troop carrier groups projected for the UK.

Work proceeded slowly as there was a problem with the drainage of waterways crossing the site. In September 1943, the official name was changed from Isle Abbotts to Merryfield, such changes being usually connected with contractual alterations or where another airfield had a similar-sounding name which might cause confusion. In this case, however the change is puzzling as the same contractors were involved and Isle Abbotts appears singularly distinctive.

The airfield's main runway was 6,000 ft and aligned 10–28, the secondaries 4,200 ft at 17–35 and 3,660 ft at 04–22. All 50 hardstands were loop types in concrete with bituminous surfaces connecting to an enclosing perimeter track, of a standard width of 50 feet.

== USAAF use ==
After the formal opening by the RAF on 9 February 1944, US engineers arrived to lay pierced steel planking at the main runway ends for glider marshalling while the necessary facilities for accommodating paratroops in the hangars arrived.

Merryfield was known as USAAF Station AAF-464 for security reasons by the USAAF during the war, and by which it was referred to instead of location. Its USAAF Station Code was "MF".

=== 441st Troop Carrier Group ===
The 441st Troop Carrier Group moved in from RAF Langar on 25 April, with over 70 Douglas C-47 Skytrains dispersed on the airfield. The group's squadrons and fuselage codes were:

- 99th Troop Carrier Squadron (3J)
- 100th Troop Carrier Squadron (8C)
- 301st Troop Carrier Squadron (Z4)
- 302d Troop Carrier Squadron (2L)

The 441st was a group of Ninth Air Force's 50th Troop Carrier Wing, IX Troop Carrier Command.

D-Day

During May 1944 1500 American troops of the 101st Airborne Division arrived in preparation for D-Day. These were part of the 24,000 airborne troops destined for Normandy. On the fateful day the airfield contributed fifty-seven C-47's, some towing gliders, to the 1900 aircraft flying across the channel from 22 airfields; creating an air armada 300 miles long. The operation kept the airfield busy, being used to fly reinforcements and support to France. On 10 July 1944 the airfield started to be used as 61st Field Hospital, staffed by 813rd Air Evacuation Squadron; the C-47's being used as air ambulances.

Soon afterwards word was received that the 50th Troop Carrier Wing would move to France, the 441st being one of the first two groups, with headquarters leaving Merryfield on 6 September for its Advanced Landing Ground (ALG), Villeneuve-Vertus Airfield (ALG A-63).

== RAF Transport Command/RAF Training Unit/Royal Navy use ==
Merryfield was retained by the USAAF IX TCC for another two months while C-47s regularly ferried supplies and personnel before being handed over to the RAF at the end of October, thus ending the Ninth Air Force's association with the station.

The C-47 in its British guise, the Dakota, still held sway at Merryfield but in much smaller numbers than when the 441st TCG was in residence. No. 238 Squadron of RAF Transport Command re-formed there with the type during the winter of 1944–45 and, when it departed overseas, No. 187 was also re-formed at Merryfield to fly Dakotas.

No. 53 Squadron with Consolidated Liberator replaced No. 187 in September, and it too was replaced by the Short Stirlings of No. 242 Squadron in December. No. 242 later converted to Avro Yorks but the long distance flights to the Middle and Far East locations on which most of these transport units had been engaged gradually subsided and the Yorks departed in May 1946. The airfield closed that October.

Until the outbreak of the Korean War and a resurgence of air power, civilian caretakers looked after the otherwise deserted airfield. Late in 1951, Merryfield was re-opened as an advanced pilot training establishment (No. 208 Advanced Flying School RAF (208 AFS)) with de Havilland Vampire and Gloster Meteor jets. This unit was one of the first to be equipped, in early 1953, with Vampire T.11s. Some additional concrete was laid in front of the main technical site and other building work conducted before the station was again run down towards the end of 1954. During the following two years, a detachment from No. 231 Operational Conversion Unit, with English Electric Canberras, was often present. It was also used by Westland Aircraft for flight tests of the Westland Wyvern. Then came the Royal Navy with de Havilland Sea Venoms but they withdrew early in 1958 and by 1961 it appeared the airfield had finally been abandoned.

Over the next few years, the airfield deteriorated and the hangars and some other buildings were sold off. A road that was closed when the airfield was built was re-opened making use of part of the main runway. In the early 1960s Ilminster Round Table organised an air display at Merryfield which featured a fly-past by an Avro Vulcan and a display by the then RAF display team, The Black Arrows, in Hawker Hunters.

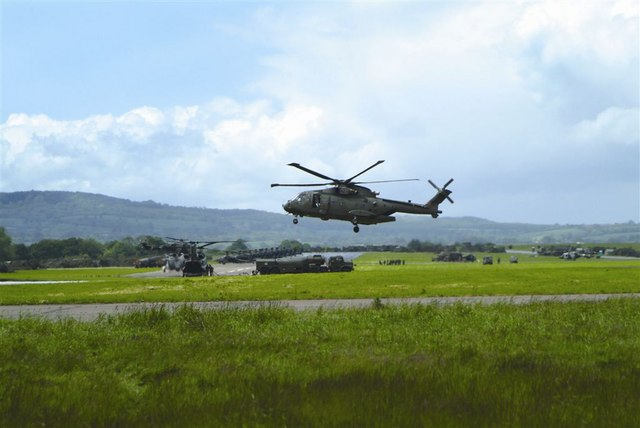
A Merlin helicopter landing at Merryfield

== Current use ==
In 1971, part of the airfield was again taken over by the Royal Navy for use in assault helicopter training and exercises that would not conflict with fixed-wing traffic on the Navy's other stations. Merryfield was soon subject to naval tradition by being labelled RNAS Merryfield (HMS Heron II) (IATA: N/A, ICAO: EGDI). In the event, the Navy's occupation proved to be the most enduring of the airfield's half century of existence, for it was still being used by its helicopters.

In the 1980s, the site was considered as a storage area for nuclear waste, but this idea was rejected owing to local geology.

In more recent years the MOD has let out this airfield for the use of the scouts for camping events. Local cycling clubs also hold races on the perimeter road circuit and runways, including Regional Championships. It is the principal site of the Royal Navy Model Aircraft Association.

Today, there is security on the gate as it is still an operational airfield and a restricted area.

== See also ==
- List of former Royal Air Force stations
- 82nd Airborne Division
- 101st Airborne Division
