= 427th Aircraft Sustainment Group =

427th Aircraft Sustainment Group

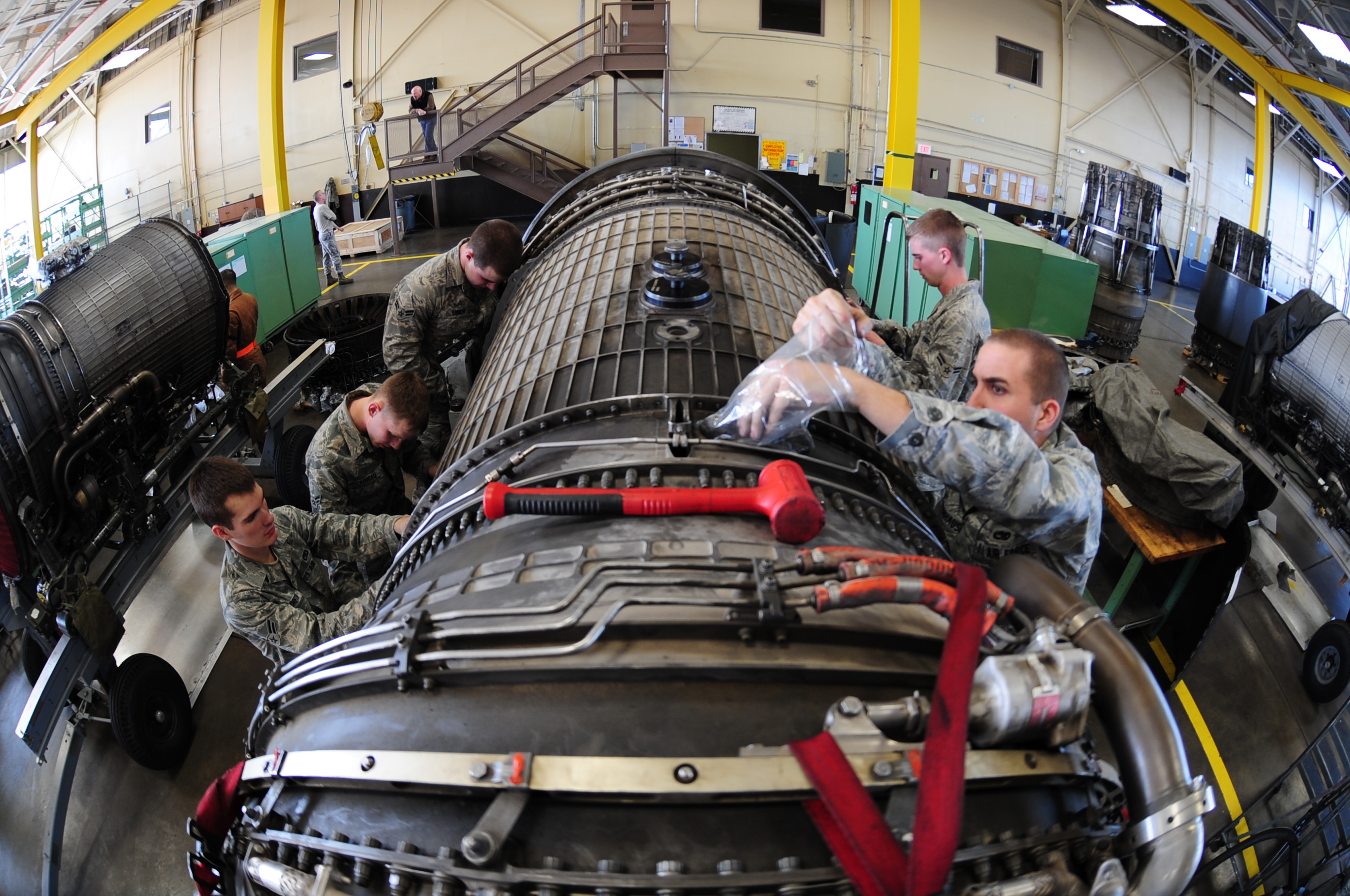
- Maintenance on a B-1 Lancer engine
- Active: 1942–1945; 2008–2010
- Country: United States
- Branch: United States Air Force
- Role: Logistics support
- Part of: Air Force Materiel Command
- Engagements: European Theater of Operations

The 427th Aircraft Sustainment Group is an inactive United States Air Force (USAF) organization. Its last assignment was with the 327th Aircraft Sustainment Wing of Air Force Materiel Command (AFMC) at Tinker Air Force Base, Oklahoma, where it was inactivated in 2010.

The group was first activated during World War II as the 27th Air Transport Group at RAF Hendon in 1943 as a logistics support organization for Eighth Air Force. The group provided intra-theater airlift services and ferried aircraft to combat units in the European Theater of Operations. One of its squadrons conducted aeromedical evacuation using single engine Noorduyn C-64 Norseman aircraft. The group moved from England to France in 1944. A detachment of the group conducted special operations in Sweden and Norway from December 1944 until V-E Day. The group was inactivated in France in October 1945. The 27th group was disbanded while inactive on 8 October 1948.

In 1985, USAF reconstituted the group as the 427th Tactical Airlift Group, but it was never active under that designation. It was activated in 2008 as the 427th Aircraft Sustainment Group and provided support for the Boeing B-52 Stratofortress. In 2010, the group was inactivated as AFMC returned to its traditional use of staff offices, rather than military units, for logistics management.

== History ==
=== World War II ===
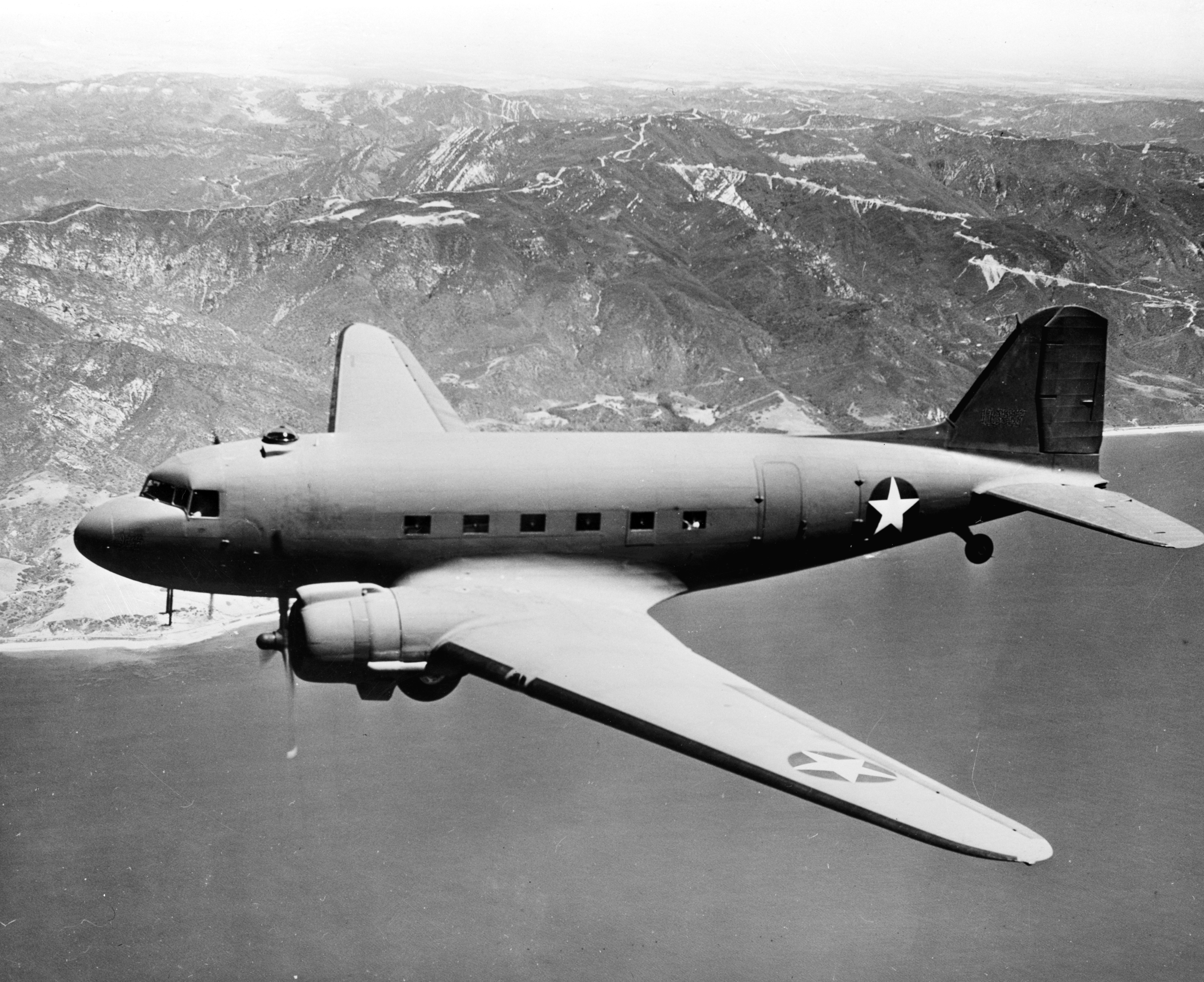
Douglas C-47 as flown by transport squadrons of the group

The group was first activated in the spring of 1943 as the 27th Air Transport Group at RAF Hendon, England to provide air transportation for Eighth Air Force. The group was activated to give a formal organization to several airlift operations that were already serving VIII Air Force Service Command. The first was located at Prestwick Airport, acting as a center for the receipt of combat crews and aircraft arriving from the United States. The second, located at Heathrow Airport provided communications support for command headquarters, and also operated a passenger and freight operation at RAF Hendon. The third and fourth locations, RAF Warton and Portreath, were involved in receiving replacement aircraft and dispatching them to combat units. After Operation Torch in November 1942, Warton also managed shipments of freight from England to the Mediterranean Theater of Operations. When the group was activated, the Hendon operation became the 86th Transport Squadron and that at Warton became the 87th Transport Squadron. Prestwick operations fell under the 519th Service Squadron, while the 520th Service Squadron was activated at Portreath.

Five additional ferrying and transport squadrons were assigned to the group in the winter of 1943. The 310th Ferrying Squadron was located at Warton and took over the ferrying mission formerly performed by the 87th Squadron. The 87th then augmented the services of Air Transport Command in moving priority freight and passengers. This mission occasionally involved the operation of Consolidated C-87 Liberator Express aircraft on flights across the Atlantic. The 325th Ferrying Squadron at Heston operated a series of air traffic detachments at locations throughout the United Kingdom.

In the fall of 1944, the group was transferred to the 302d Transport Wing along with the 31st Transport Group of Ninth Air Force. It lost its group commander, Col. Arnold, and most of its staff to the new wing. The group began to taper off its operations in the United Kingdom and transfer its operations to the continent of Europe, although the 325th squadron remained in the United Kingdom to operate its ferrying detachments. The group's squadrons, which had been spread over several bases in the United Kingdom, assembled at RAF Grove and moved in sequence to Le Bourget Airport. near Paris. France, led by the 320th Transport Squadron. In November, one of the group's original squadrons, the 87th was transferred from the group to the Base Air Depot Area. The 87th was heavily involved in transporting fuel to General Patton's rapidly advancing Third Army.

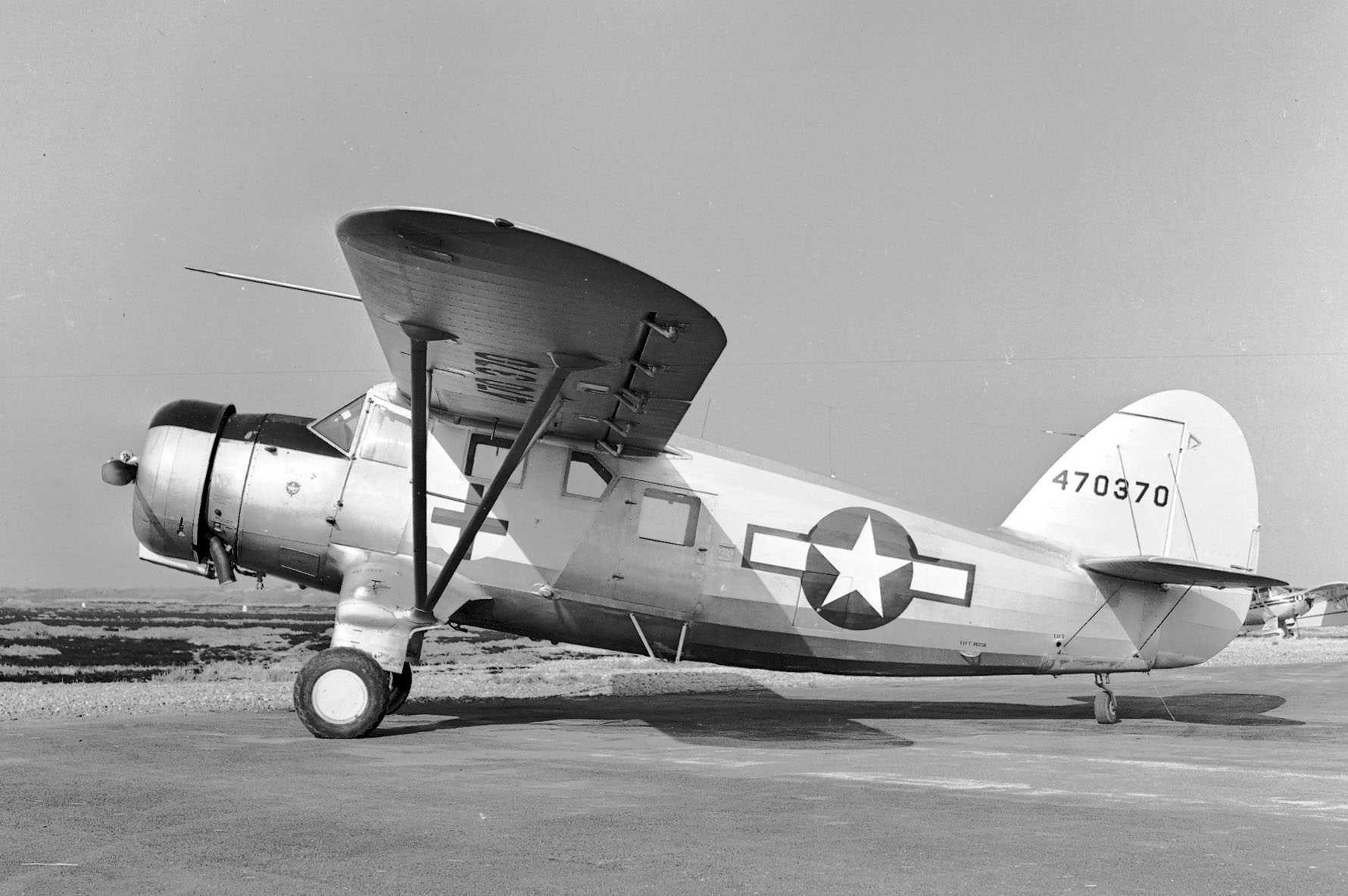
Noorduyn UC-64A marked with a red cross for medical evacuation missions

Despite their designation, three of the group's four ferrying squadrons did not operate as such. The 310th was, in effect, an additional transport squadron, while the 311th and 312th began to operate a theater school to train radio operators in the fall of 1944. One of the group's transport units, the 320th Transport Squadron, was equipped with Noorduyn UC-64 Norseman aircraft for medical evacuation missions.

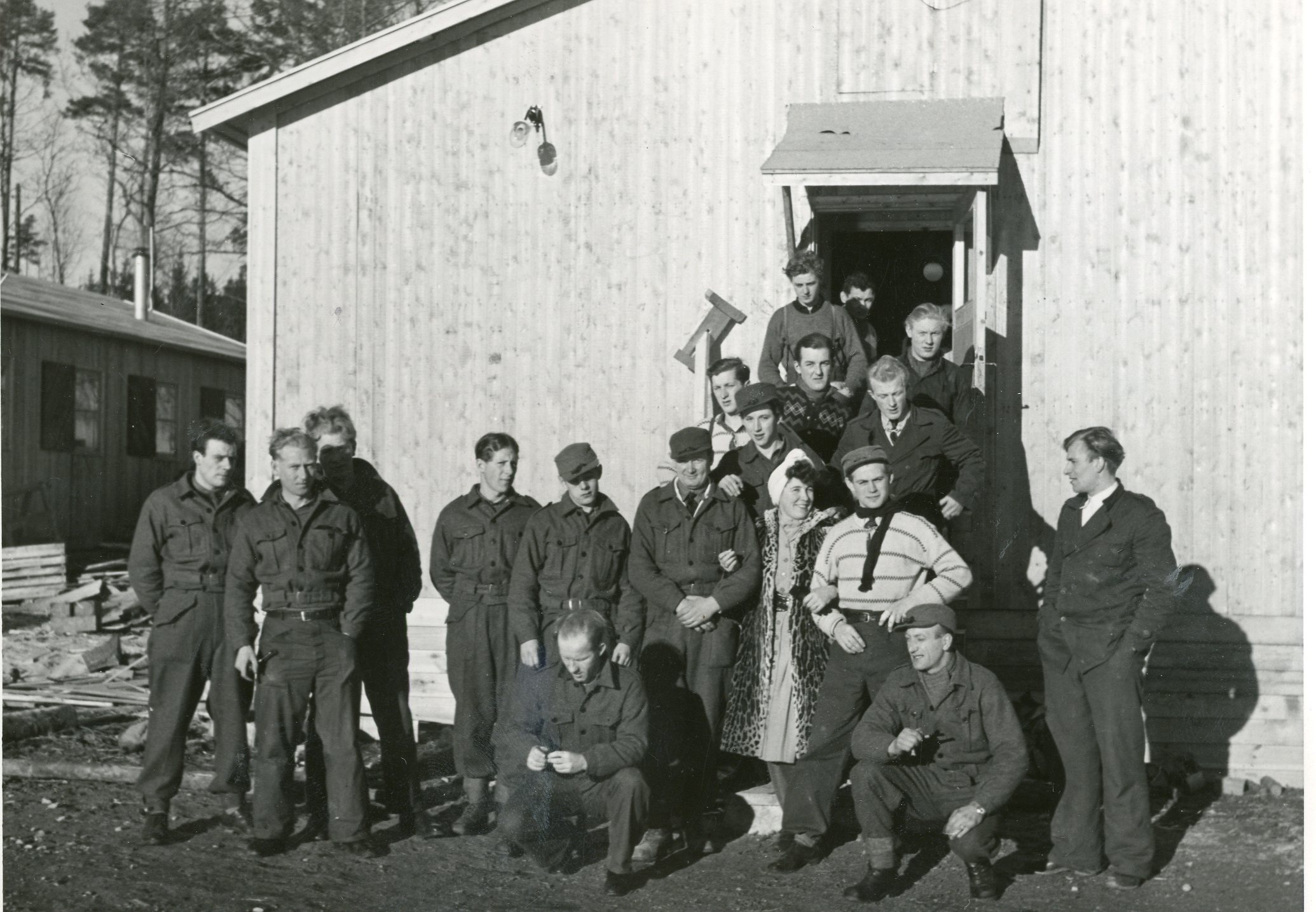
Norwegian police troops at barracks in Sweden

In November 1944, ten Douglas C-47 Skytrain aircraft and their crews were withdrawn from the group and attached to the 302d wing for what was termed Project A. They were further detached the next month to the European Division of Air Transport Command's 1409th AAF Base Unit, becoming Operating Location 1409-1J. These aircraft moved to Luleå Airport in northern Sweden, near the Norwegian border. The operation, under the command of Colonel Bernt Balchen, was also known as Operation Where and When. For the remainder of the war, they supported Norwegian "police" units, transporting hospital equipment, paratroops and supplies for Norwegian resistance forces.

Air transportation was the only means of communication in the area because of the mountains. Normally available sea transport to the area's fjords was prevented by German mining operations. The C-47s airlifted over 1000 troops to Kirkenes Airport, Norway, a former Luftwaffe field, that had been occupied by Soviet forces. Operations were typically flown under radio silence at low altitudes, using the mountainous terrain to shield the aircraft from detection. As the Norwegian troops advanced, operations began to be flown to Banak. Operations became easier following V-E Day, when the flights could operate openly, even receiving weather information from stations still being operated by the Luftwaffe.

The group remained in the theater after the end of the war and was inactivated at Villacoublay Airfield near Paris on 15 October 1945.

=== Logistic operations ===
In 1985 the group was reconstituted and redesignated the 427th Tactical Airlift Group. However, the group remained inactive until January 2008, when it was activated at Tinker Air Force Base as the 427th Aircraft Sustainment Group and assigned to the 327th Aircraft Sustainment Wing. Its mission was logistical support for the Rockwell B-1 Lancer bomber, acting as the Systems Program Office for the Lancer. The group refurbished approximately thirteen Lancers a year and implemented programs to reduce the time the aircraft spent in depots and to improve the availability of engines for forward deployed expeditionary units. It also managed the installation of laser "sniper pods" on the B-1 to enable it to target and engage in real time and perform instant bomb damage assessment.

In 2010, Air Force Materiel Command returned to its traditional organizational structure and the group was inactivated and replaced by the B-1 Sustainment Division of Oklahoma City Air Logistics Center. Its three squadrons became the division's Production Support, Logistics Support, and Modification Support Branches.

== Lineage ==
- Constituted as the 27th Air Transport Group

Activated on 15 April 1943
Inactivated on 15 October 1945

- Disbanded on 8 October 1948
- Reconstituted on 31 July 1985 and redesignated 427th Tactical Airlift Group
- Redesignated 427th Aircraft Sustainment Group

Activated on 11 January 2008
Inactivated on 30 June 2010

=== Assignments ===
- VIII Air Force Service Command (later Air Service Command, United States Strategic Air Forces): 15 April 1943
- 302d Transport Wing: 1 September 1944
- Unknown: 5 April 1945
- 302d Transport Wing: 18 July 1945 – 15 October 1945
- 327th Aircraft Sustainment Wing: 11 January 2008 – 30 June 2010

=== Components ===
- 86th Transport Squadron, 15 April 1943 – 15 October 1945
- 87th Transport Squadron, 15 April 1943 – November 1944
- 310th Ferrying Squadron, 1943 – 11 November 1944
- 311th Ferrying Squadron, 1 November 1943 – April 1945 (attached to First Tactical Air Force after c. October 1944)
- 312th Ferrying Squadron, 1 November 1943 – c. 15 September 1945
- 312th Station Complement Squadron, c. 1 September 1944 – 11 November 1944, December 1944 – 12 April 1945
- 320th Transport Squadron (Cargo & Mail), 1 November 1943 – 18 July 1945
- 321st Transport Squadron (Cargo & Mail), 1 November 1943 – 11 November 1944
- 325th Ferrying Squadron, 9 December 1943 – 9 December 1943
- 519th Service Squadron, 15 April 1943 – c. 1 September 1944
- 520th Service Squadron, 15 April 1943 – c. 1 September 1944
- 553d Aircraft Sustainment Squadron, 11 January 2008 – 30 June 2010
- 554th Aircraft Sustainment Squadron, 11 January 2008 – 30 June 2010
- 555th Aircraft Sustainment Squadron, 11 January 20098 – 30 June 2010

=== Stations ===
- RAF Hendon, 14 April 1943
- RAF Heston, January 1944
- RAF Grove, c. 6 September 1944
- Le Bourget Airport, France, November 1944
- Villacoublay Airfield, France, March 1945 – 15 October 1945
- Tinker Air Force Base, Oklahoma, 11 January 2008 – 30 June 2010

=== Aircraft ===
- Douglas C-47 Skytrain, 1943–1945
- Noorduyn UC-64 Norseman, 1944–1945 (Note: In addition, the group operated most types of aircraft used by Eighth and Ninth Air Force. It maintained a number of these aircraft on strength to train ferry crews. E.g. Aircraft listed in Maguire, pp. 283–286)

== Campaigns ==
Campaign Streamer	Campaign	Dates	Notes
	Northern France	25 July 1944 – 14 September 1944	27th Air Transport Group

== See also ==
- List of Douglas C-47 Skytrain operators
