= Vernouillet Airport =

Vernouillet Airport Advanced Landing Ground (ALG) A-41
- IATA: none; ICAO: LFON

Summary
- Location: Vernouillet, France
- Elevation AMSL: 443 ft / 135 m
- Coordinates: 48°42′22″N 001°21′42″E

Map
- Location of Vernouillet Airport

Runways
Direction	Length		Surface
Direction	ft	m	Surface
04/22	2,362	720	Turf

Vernouillet Airport is a regional airport in France (ICAO: LFON), close to the town of Vernouillet, Eure-et-Loir. It supports general aviation with no commercial airline service scheduled.

== History ==
Dreux airport was built in the 1920s as a grass airfield. In the 1930s it was upgraded to include two concrete runways, a primary 02/20 at 1692 m (5500 ft) and a secondary 12/30 at 1354 m (4400 ft). In addition, a control tower, terminal and a hangar provided services to passengers and aircraft.

=== French use during World War II ===
The French Air Force Armée de l'Air used Dreux during the Battle of France. The Polish squadron G.C. I/145 was transferred north from Lyon Mions Airport to Dreux Vernouillet Airport during the later phases of the Battle of France. I/145 operated Caudron CR.714 fighter planes in air defence roles until France was over-run and Dreux was seized by the Germans in June 1940.

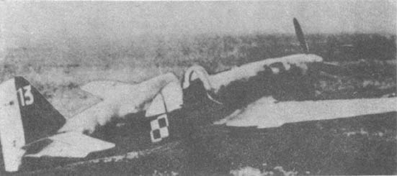
Caudron CR.714 fighter plane of Groupe de Chasse I/145, June 1940

=== German use during World War II ===
Seized by the Germans in June 1940 during the Battle of France, Dreux was used as a Luftwaffe military airfield during the occupation. Known units assigned (all from Luftlotte 3, Fliegerkorps IV):

- Kampfgeschwader 55 (KG 55) 1 August 1940 – 14 April 1941 Heinkel He 111P/H (Fuselage Code: G1+)
- Kampfgeschwader 51 (KG 51) 25 April-23 May 1944 Messerschmitt Me 410A (Fuselage Code: 9K+)
- Schnellkampfgeschwader 10 (SKG 10) 6–15 June 1944 Focke-Wulf Fw 190A
- Jagdgeschwader 3 (JG 3) 8–13 June 1944 Focke-Wulf Fw 190A; 12 July–August 1944 Messerschmitt Bf 109G

KG 55 took part in the Battle of Britain and subsequent night bombing raids on England. KG 51 was a fighter/bomber unit, and along with SKG 10 and JG 3, attacked Eighth Air Force daylight heavy bomber raids over Occupied Europe and Germany.

Largely due to its use as a base for Fw 190 interceptors, Dreux was attacked by USAAF Ninth Air Force Martin B-26 Marauder medium bombers and Republic P-47 Thunderbolts mostly with 500-pound general-purpose bombs; unguided rockets and .50 caliber machine gun sweeps when Eighth Air Force heavy bombers (B-17s, B-24s) were within interception range of the Luftwaffe aircraft assigned to the base. The attacks were timed to have the maximum effect possible to keep the interceptors pinned down on the ground and be unable to attack the heavy bombers. Also the P-51 Mustang fighter-escort groups of Eighth Air Force would drop down on their return to England and attack the base with a fighter sweep and attack any target of opportunity to be found at the airfield.

=== American use ===
It was liberated by Allied ground forces about 18-19 August 1944 during the Northern France Campaign by the 40th Tank Battalion, 7th US Armoured Division. Almost immediately, the USAAF IX Engineering Command 840th Engineer Aviation Battalions began clearing the airport of mines and destroyed Luftwaffe aircraft, and repairing operational facilities for use by American aircraft. Pierced Steel Planking was laid down over some filled in bomb craters on the main runway and it became fully operational for combat aircraft. Dreux Airport became a USAAF Ninth Air Force combat airfield, designated as "A-41" about 26 August, just a few days after its capture from German forces.

Under American control, the airport hosted numerous combat units.

- 366th Fighter Group, flew Republic P-47 Thunderbolts from 24 August-8 September 1944
- 397th Bombardment Group, flew amrtin B-26 Marauders from 11 September-6 October 1944
- 441st Troop Carrier Group, flew Douglas C-47 Skytrains 3 November 1944 – 12 August 1945. The C-47s pulled gliders in the airborne assault across the Rhine (Operation Varsity).

After the war, the airport was returned to French civil control.

=== Cold War ===
With the outbreak of the Cold War in the late 1940s, negotiations began in November 1950 between NATO and the United States to establish air bases and station combat wings in France to meet European defense needs. During the negotiations for selection sites, the airport at Dreux was proposed by the United States for expansion into a modern NATO air base. However, the French government rejected the airfield at Dreux, citing the expansion of Orly Airport near Paris presenting a conflict with airspace traffic, and plans were in the works to expand Vernouillet into a commercial site. A completely new NATO airfield was eventually built near the village of Dampierre, about 10 miles to the west, to accommodate the United States Air Force as a tactical airlift base. That would become Dreux-Louvilliers Air Base (1955–1967).

=== Current ===
As mentioned before, with the expansion of Orly Airport, air traffic congestion became a severe problem and it was decided to close Dreux airport. The airport was torn down and its runways and other concreted areas removed. However, a grass airstrip was built to accommodate light general aviation for the Dreux area, the airport which exists today.

The runways of the prewar airport and wartime airfield can still be seen in aerial photography. They can be seen at 48°42′13″N 001°21′53″E.

== See also ==
- Advanced Landing Ground
