= Villeneuve-Vertus Airfield =

Villeneuve-Vertus Airfield Advanced Landing Ground (ALG) A-63

- Champagne-Ardenne Region, France Villeneuve-Vertus Airfield (France)

Site information
- Type: Military airfield
- Controlled by: United States Army Air Forces

Location
- Coordinates: 48°54′19″N 004°00′07″E

Site history
- Built by: IX Engineering Command
- In use: September 1944-May 1945
- Materials: Grass

Villeneuve-Vertus Airfield is an abandoned World War II military airfield, which is located near the commune of Vertus in the Champagne-Ardenne department of northern France.

Located just near the commune, it was a United States Army Air Force temporary airfield established during the Northern France Campaign in September 1944. Its primary use was for C-47 Skytrain transport of Army airborne parachute units, and for resupply of ground forces and casualty evacuation.

== History ==
Known as Advanced Landing Ground "A-63", the airfield consisted of a single 3600' grass runway aligned 07/25. In addition, with tents were used for billeting and also for support facilities; an access road was built to the existing road infrastructure; a dump for supplies, ammunition, and gasoline drums, along with a drinkable water and minimal electrical grid for communications and station lighting.

Combat units stationed at the airfield were the 441st Troop Carrier Group, which based C-47 Skytrain transports at the field from 8 September until 2 October 1944.

After the Americans moved east with the advancing Allied Armies, the airfield did not have any active unit assigned, but was manned with a minimal support unit for casualty evacuation and supply transports. It was closed on 23 May 1945, and the land was returned to its owners. Today there is little or no physical evidence of its existence or its location.

== See also ==
- Advanced Landing Ground
