= Saint Marceau Airfield =

Saint Marceau Airfield Advanced Landing Ground (ALG) A-43

- Pays de la Loire Region, France Saint Marceau Airfield (France)

Site information
- Type: Military airfield
- Controlled by: United States Army Air Forces

Location
- Coordinates: 48°10′42″N 000°09′31″E

Site history
- Built by: IX Engineering Command
- In use: August–November 1944
- Materials: Prefabricated Hessian Surfacing (PHS)
- Battles/wars: Western Front (World War II); Northern France Campaign; Eastern France/Benelux Campaign

Saint Marceaul Airfield is an abandoned World War II military airfield, which is located near the commune of Saint-Marceau in the Pays de la Loire region of northern France.

Located just outside Saint-Marceau, the United States Army Air Force established a temporary airfield on 20 August 1944, shortly after the Allied landings in France. The airfield was constructed by the IX Engineering Command, 819th Engineer Aviation Battalion.

== History ==
Known as Advanced Landing Ground "A-43", the airfield consisted of a single 5000' (1500m) Prefabricated Hessian Surfacing runway aligned 08/26. In addition, tents were used for billeting and also for support facilities; an access road was built to the existing road infrastructure; a dump for supplies, ammunition, and gasoline drums, along with a drinkable water and minimal electrical grid for communications and station lighting.

The 474th Fighter Group, based Lockheed P-38 Lightning fighters at Saint Marceau from 2 to 12 September 1944. The 474th was replaced by the 442d Troop Carrier Group, which flew Douglas C-47 Skytrains from the airfield from 5 October until 7 November 1944

The fighter planes flew support missions during the Allied invasion of Normandy, patrolling roads in front of the beachhead; strafing German military vehicles and dropping bombs on gun emplacements, anti-aircraft artillery and concentrations of German troops in Normandy and Brittany when spotted.

After the Americans moved east into Central France with the advancing Allied Armies, the airfield was closed on 20 November 1944. Today the long dismantled airfield is indistinguishable from the agricultural fields in the area.

== See also ==
- Advanced Landing Ground
