= 26th Space Aggressor Squadron =

26th Space Aggressor Squadron

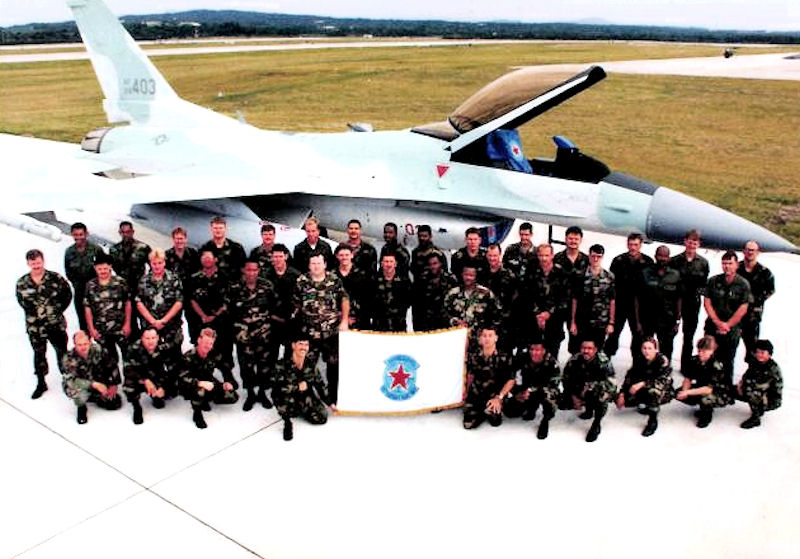
- Crew group shot from the 26th Aggressor Squadron (Note: The aircraft is General Dynamics F-16C Fighting Falcon Block 30K serial 88-403.)
- Active: 1917–1919; 1921–1924; 1930–1948; 1948–1968; 1973–1990; 2003–present
- Country: United States
- Branch: United States Air Force
- Type: Squadron
- Role: Aggressor (Space)
- Part of: Air Force Reserve Command
- Garrison/HQ: Schriever Space Force Base, Colorado
- Motto: Resistere Futile Est (Latin for 'Resistance is Futile')
- Engagements: World War I Southwest Pacific Theater
- Decorations: Distinguished Unit Citation; Navy Presidential Unit Citation; Air Force Outstanding Unit Award

Commanders
- Current commander: Lt Col Frank Kincaid
- Notable commanders: Major Raynal Bolling; 1st Lt Nathan F. Twining

Insignia
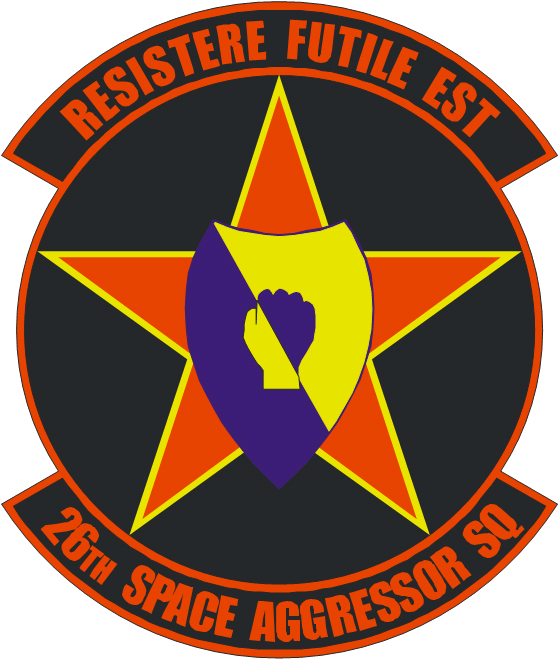
- 26th Space Aggressor Squadron emblem (Note: Approved 26 June 2003.)

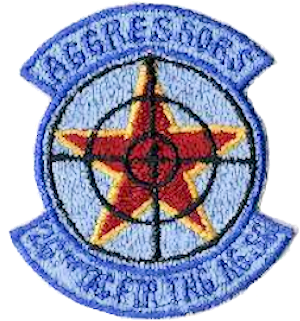
- Patch with 26th Tactical Fighter Training Aggressor Squadron emblem

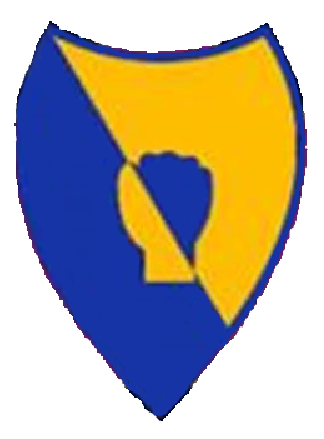
- 26th Attack Squadron emblem (Note: Approved 15 February 1924. Description: On a shield parted per bend blue and orange [sic], a clenched hand couped at the wrist counterchanged. Maurer notes the description of the division per bend should be orange and blue, with the color on top mentioned first. Maurer, Combat Squadrons, p. 134.)

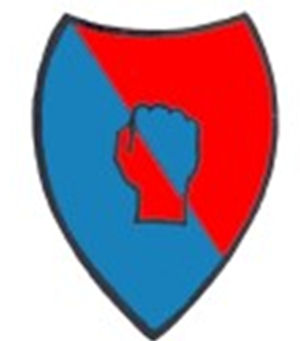
- 26th Aero Squadron emblem (Note: Approved by AEF 18 November 1918.)

The 26th Space Aggressor Squadron is a unit of the United States Air Force located at Schriever Space Force Base, Colorado. It is part of the 926th Group and is the reserve associate of the 527th Space Aggressor Squadron. It was founded in 1914 as part of the New York National Guard and served in both world wars. It was reactivated in 2003. Its current mission is to train military personnel on how to deal with Global Positioning System and satellite communications outages and other threats.

== Mission ==
The mission of the 26th Space Aggressor Squadron is to replicate enemy threats to space-based and space-enabled systems during tests and training exercises. By using Global Positioning System and satellite communications jamming techniques, it provides Air Force, joint and coalition military personnel with an understanding of how to recognize, mitigate, counter and defeat these threats.

The 26th's tasks are to know, teach and replicate a wide array of terrestrial and space threats to the U.S. military's space enablers. The squadron trains the warfighter to operate in an environment where systems like GPS and SATCOM interfered with or denied—preparing them for the current and future fights.

== History ==
Founded in 1914, the 26th is the oldest squadron in the Air Force Reserve and one of the oldest in the United States Air Force. The squadron was organized as the 1st Reserve Aero Squadron on 26 May 1917, the first squadron of what would become the United States Air Force Reserve in 1948.

=== Origins ===
Elements of the squadron date to November 1915 when it was organized as part of the New York National Guard as the Aviation Detachment, First Battalion Signal Corps, New York National Guard, and shortly thereafter as the 1st Aero Company.

The company was provisionally recognized by the federal government on 22 June 1916 and brought to U.S. service on 13 July 1916, with the objective of sending personnel and equipment to the 1st Aero Squadron in Mexico with the punitive expedition under General John J. Pershing. After being federalized, the company began training on 22 July at the new Mineola Signal Corps Aviation School under two Regular Army instructors assigned by the Signal Corps. The Army eventually trained 25 pilots but the 1st Aero Company was mustered out of federal service on 2 November 1916 without ever leaving Long Island, and was disbanded on 23 May 1917.

In the meantime, the National Defense Act of 1916, passed on 3 June, authorized an aviation section in the Signal Reserve Corps of 296 officers and 2,000 enlisted men as part of the Army's Aviation Section, U.S. Signal Corps. At Fort Jay, New York, attorney Phillip A. Carroll established the Governors Island Training Corps, a privately funded program to train civilians to pass the Reserve Military Aviator flying test and receive commissions in the Signal Officers Reserve Corps. The instructional program was under the guidance of the Army's Eastern Department, commanded by Major Gen. Leonard Wood, and trained seven civilians who were commissioned as Reserve Military Aviators.

=== World War I ===
After the United States' entry into World War I, the unit, less New York guardsmen and the new Reserve military Aviators were organized into a new unit at Mineola by Major Raynal Bolling and now-Captain Carroll. Federalized in June 1917, the 1st Reserve Aero Squadron trained during the summer of 1917 and sailed for Europe aboard the RMS Baltic on 23 August with eight other aero squadrons. Reaching France in Le Havre on 17 September, it arrived at its duty station at Issoudun Aerodrome, home of the Third Aviation Instruction Center, on 21 September. After receiving further training in French schools in Pau and Tours Aerodrome until November, it assembled, serviced, and repaired aircraft. The 1st was redesignated as the 26th Aero Squadron on 1 October 1917 as part of a reorganization of the Air Service of the AEF. The 26th Aero Squadron left Issoudun on 13 April 1919, and remained in France until May 1919 when the unit returned to the United States and was demobilized.

=== Interwar period ===
The 26th Squadron (Attack) was authorized on 30 August 1921 and the following month was organized and assigned to the 3d Attack Group at Kelly Field, Texas. It was assigned various World War I era biplanes and experimental American aircraft of the 1920s. The squadron patrolled the Mexican Border, delivered airmail and performed other missions as assigned until inactivating in 1924, shortly after consolidating with the World War I 26th Aero Squadron.

The squadron was reactivated as the 26th Attack Squadron at Wheeler Field, Hawaii in 1930 and was equipped with Curtiss A-3 Falcons, which were used as fighter-bombers in the 1930s as part of the defense of the islands. Although it was assigned to the 5th Composite Group, it was attached to 18th Pursuit Group. Newer Douglas B-18 Bolos were assigned in late 1939, and the unit was redesignated as the 26th Bombardment Squadron and assigned to the 18th Wing.

On 1 February 1940, the 11th Bombardment Group was activated at Hickam Field, Hawaii, and the squadron moved there to become one of the original four squadrons of the group. Beginning in May 1941, the squadron began training with the Boeing B-17D Flying Fortress, with the capability to fly longer missions from its base at Hickam.

=== World War II ===
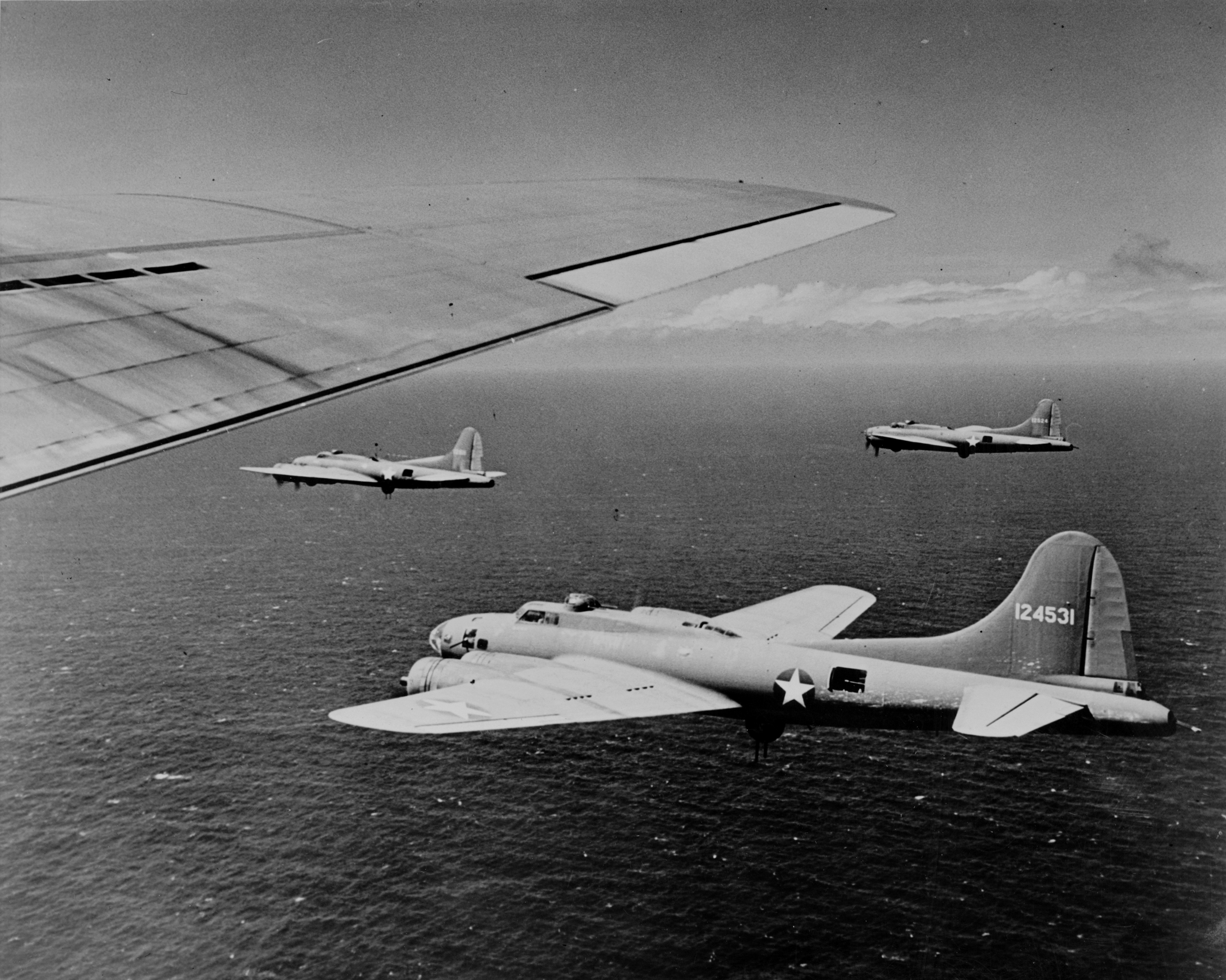
Squadron B-17F Flying Fortress bombers over the Southwest Pacific in 1942 (Note: The Boeing B-17F-20-BO Flying Fortress, serial 41-24531 visible on the right was shot down by a Japanese Mitsubishi A6M Zero fighter over Tonolei harbour, Buna Island, Solomon Islands on 18 November 1942. During the attack the pilot Maj. Allen J. Seward, and the copilot Lt. Jack Lee were killed. One engine caught on fire, but Col. LaVerne Saunders made a water landing about 50 km from Tonolei harbour near a very small island. An Australian coastwatcher reached the survivors about three hours later. The crew was taken to Vella Lavella Island an picked up by a Navy Consolidated PBY-5 Catalina and returned to Guadalcanal.)

The squadron was at Hickam during the Japanese attack on Pearl Harbor on 7 December 1941. The squadron flew patrol and search mission from the Hawaiian Islands, including air support during the Battle of Midway. In June 1942, shortly after the Battle of Midway, the 11th Group was authorized as a mobile force by the Army Air Forces in order to respond to a Navy request by Admiral Nimitz for long-range armed search planes to locate Japanese fleets, accompanied with firepower to withstand defending Japanese interceptors while tracking the fleet. The 11th Group left Hawaii to support Navy operations in the South Pacific Theater during the Guadalcanal and Northern Solomon Islands Campaigns.

The squadron moved to the New Hebrides on 25 July 1942 and became part of Thirteenth Air Force. It bombed airfields, supply dumps, ships, docks, troop positions, and other objectives in the South Pacific from July to November 1942, and received a Distinguished Unit Citation for those operations. It continued operations in the South Pacific, attacking Japanese airfields, installations, and shipping until late March 1943.

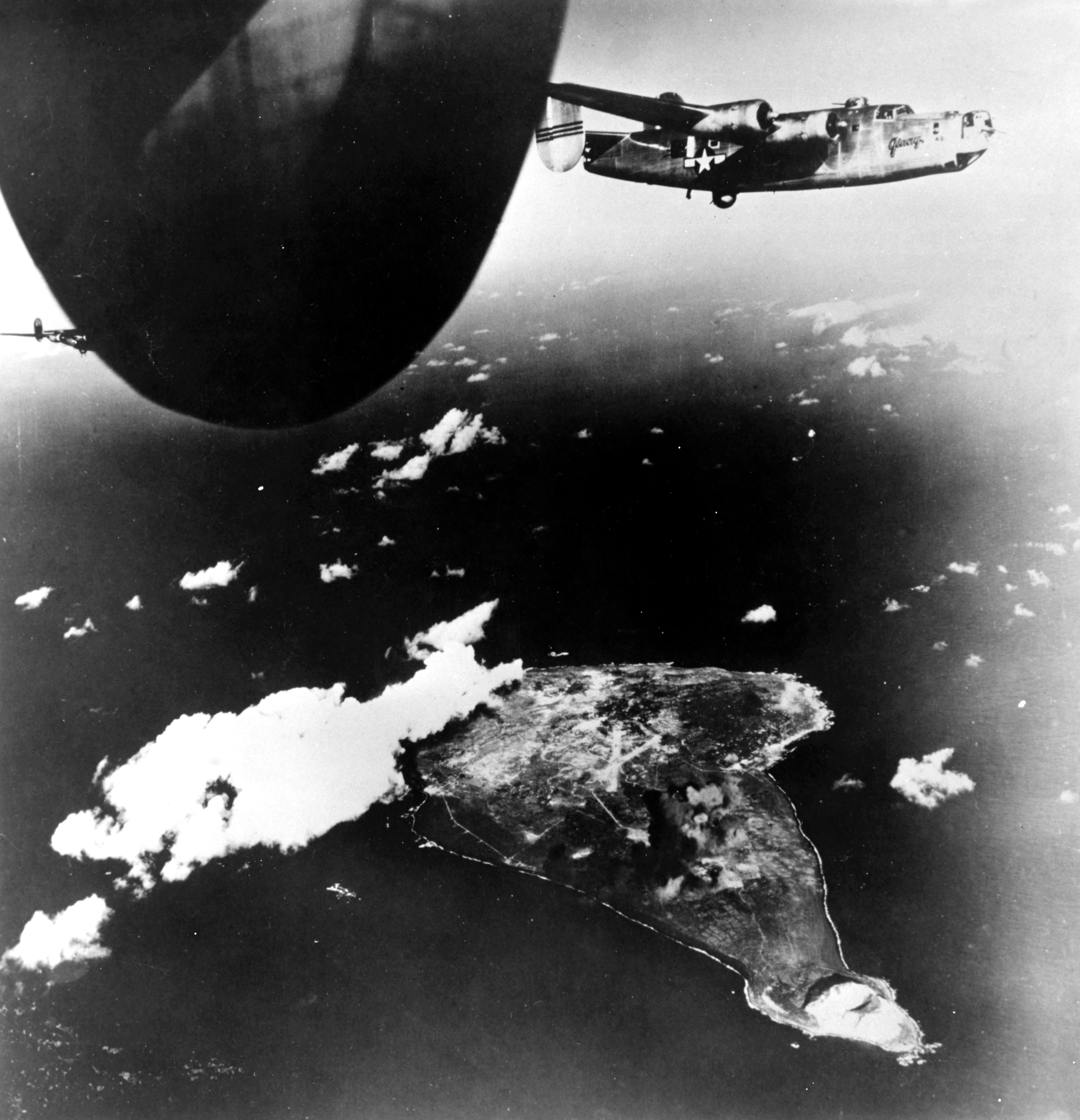
11th Group B-24 Liberators after attacking Iwo Jima on 15 December 1944

The squadron returned to Hawaii and the control of Seventh Air Force on 11 May 1943. In Hawaii, the squadron equipped with Consolidated B-24 Liberator bombers, which it flew until the end of the war. Its training Included missions against Wake Island and other central Pacific bases held by the Japanese. It deployed to Ellice Island on 11 November 1943 and resumed combat participating in the Allied offensive through the Gilbert, Marshall and Marianas Islands, while operating from Funafuti, Tarawa, and Kwajalein.

"The [squadron] moved to Guam on 25 October 1944 and attacked shipping and airfields in the Volcano and Bonin Islands. It moved to Okinawa on 2 July 1945 to participate in the final phases of the air offensive against Japan, bombing railways, airfields, and harbor facilities on Kyushu and striking Japanese airfields in Eastern China."

=== Postwar operations in the Pacific ===
After V-J Day, the squadron flew surveillance and reconnaissance missions over China and ferried former prisoners of war to the Philippines. In December 1945 the squadron moved without personnel or equipment to Fort William McKinley, Philippines. At the end of April 1946, it was designated as a very heavy bomber unit. The following month, it moved to Northwest Field, Guam and began to re-equip with Boeing B-29 Superfortresses, but terminated all operations and training by October. The squadron remained on Guam on paper until inactivating on 20 October 1948.

=== Strategic Air Command bomber operations ===
The squadron was activated under Strategic Air Command in December 1948 at Carswell Air Force Base, Texas, the squadron received the new Convair B-36B Peacemaker intercontinental strategic bomber. It upgraded to the jet-assisted B-36D in 1950, then the B-36J-III Featherweight in 1954. The squadron trained in heavy bombardment operations and participated in many SAC exercises and deployments. In 1958 moved to Altus Air Force Base, Oklahoma and was re-equipped with new Boeing B-52E Stratofortresses and continued operations as well as standing nuclear alert. Remained at Altus on alert status until B-52Es were phased out of SAC service and consigned to storage in 1968. Afterward the squadron was inactivated.

=== Fighter and aggressor operations ===
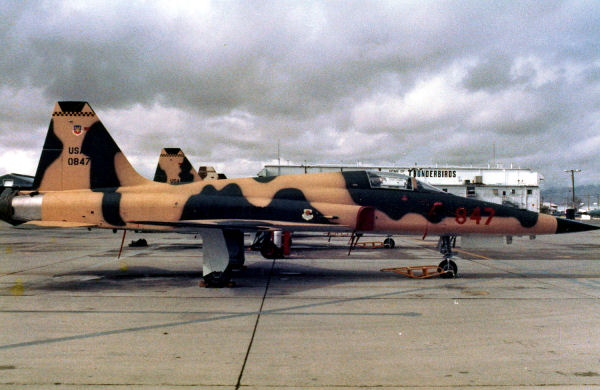
Northrop F-5E Tiger IIs of the 26th Training Aggressor Squadron at Clark AB (Note: F-5E serial 73-847 in the foreground was originally scheduled for shipment to the Republic of Vietnam Air Force, however the aircraft was retained by the USAF after the collapse of the South Vietnamese government in 1975. With the inactivation of the 26th, this aircraft was sold to the Honduran Air Force.)

The squadron was activated under Pacific Air Forces (PACAF) at Clark Air Base, Philippines in 1973 with a training mission to provide dissimilar air combat training to PACAF fighter squadrons using Soviet-style fighter tactics. It was non-operational until the end of August 1975, by which time the 405th Fighter Wing had been replaced by the 3rd Tactical Fighter Wing at Clark. Even then, it did not start training activities until January 1976, using a number of Northrop T-38 Talon aircraft made surplus by the arrival of the Northrop F-5E Tiger IIs at Nellis Air Force Base, Nevada. Eventually, the squadron also received the F-5E, with some of the planes coming from stocks destined for the Republic of Vietnam Air Force but never delivered and an embargoed Ethiopian Air Force order. By that time it had been redesignated the 26th Tactical Fighter Training Squadron, and then as a tactical fighter training and aggressor squadron. Eventually, it became the 26th Aggressor Squadron. The aggressor F-5Es were painted in a variety of colorful camouflage schemes designed to mimic those in use by Warsaw Pact aircraft. Two-digit Soviet-style nose codes were applied to most aggressor aircraft, and these coincided with the last two digits of the serial number. When there was duplication, three digits were used. The squadron was among the first to apply the star and bar in toned-down or stencil form.

By the late 1980s, the aircraft were becoming worn out after years of high-performance fighter training, with some aircraft being grounded for structural failures. In addition, the F-5E no longer could provide the training as a new generation of Soviet aircraft were becoming operational. The 26th at Clark was scheduled to dispose of its F-5Es in favor of General Dynamics F-16 Fighting Falcon and move to Kadena Air Base, Okinawa, in October 1988. The unit was minimally manned at Kadena while the squadron awaited new aircraft, flying a few borrowed aircraft from the 18th Tactical Fighter Wing. However, in 1990, the decision was made to terminate the entire USAF aggressor program. The 26th AS was inactivated on 21 February 1990 before it could receive its own F-16s.

=== Space aggressor unit ===
Reactivated under Air Force Space Command in 2003 as the 26th Space Aggressor Squadron, part of the 310th Space Wing at Schriever Air Force Base, Colorado. In 2007 the unit was reassigned to the 926th Group at Nellis and was transferred to Air Combat Command. However, the 26th remained at Schriever SFB, despite the organization as a geographically separated unit.

== Lineage ==
26th Aero Squadron

- Organized as the 1st Reserve Aero Squadron on 26 May 1917

Redesignated 26th Aero Squadron on 1 October 1917
Demobilized on 7 June 1919
Reconstituted and consolidated with the 26th Attack Squadron as the 26th Attack Squadron on 8 April 1924

26th Space Aggressor Squadron

- Authorized as the 26th Squadron (Attack) on 30 August 1921

Organized on 15 September 1921
Redesignated 26th Attack Squadron on 25 January 1923
Consolidated with the 26th Aero Squadron on 8 April 1924
Inactivated on 27 June 1924
Activated on 1 September 1930
Redesignated 26th Bombardment Squadron Medium on 6 December 1939
Redesignated 26th Bombardment Squadron Heavy on 11 December 1940
Redesignated 26th Bombardment Squadron, Heavy c. 3 August 1944
Redesignated 26th Bombardment Squadron, Heavy on 30 April 1946
Inactivated on 20 October 1948
Redesignated 26th Bombardment Squadron, Heavy and activated on 1 December 1948
Discontinued and inactivated on 2 July 1968

- Redesignated 26th Tactical Fighter Squadron on 24 September 1973

Activated on 30 September 1973
Redesignated 26th Tactical Fighter Training Squadron on 31 August 1975
Redesignated 26th Tactical Fighter Training Aggressor Squadron on 30 November 1977
Redesignated 26th Aggressor Squadron on 22 April 1983
Inactivated on 21 February 1990

- Redesignated 26th Space Aggressor Squadron on 21 February 2003

Activated in the reserve on 1 October 2003

=== Assignments ===
- Eastern Department, 26 May 1917
- Third Aviation Instruction Center, c. September 1917
- Unknown, April–7 June 1919
- 3d Attack Group, 15 September 1921 – 27 June 1924
- 5th Composite Group (later 5 Bombardment Group), 1 September 1930 (attached to 18th Pursuit Group)
- 18th Wing (later 18th Bombardment Wing), (Note: This wing is not related to the current 18th Wing, which was established in 1948.) (later 18th Bombardment Wing), 12 October 1938 12 October 1938 (attached to 18th Pursuit Group until c. 10 December 1939)
- 11th Bombardment Group, 1 February 1940 – 20 October 1948
- 11th Bombardment Group, 1 December 1948 (attached to 11th Bombardment Wing after 16 February 1951)
- 11th Bombardment Wing (later 11th Strategic Aerospace Wing), 16 June 1952 – 2 July 1968
- 405th Fighter Wing, 30 September 1973
- 3d Tactical Fighter Wing, 16 September 1974
- 18th Tactical Fighter Wing, 1 October 1988 – 21 February 1990
- 310th Space Group, 1 October 2003
- 926th Group (later 926th Wing), 17 August 2007 – present

=== Stations ===
- Hazelhurst Field, New York, 26 May–23 Aug 1917
- Le Havre, France, 17 September 1917
- Issoudun Aerodrome, France, 20 September 1917

Detachments trained at Pau and Tours Aerodrome, France, 28 September-Nov 1917

- Clisson, France, 13 April 1919
- St Sebastien sur Loire, France, 1 May 1919
- St Nazaire, France, 5–13 May 1919
- Mitchel Field, New York, 27 May-7 Jun 1919
- Kelly Field, Texas, 15 September 1921 – 27 June 1924
- Wheeler Field, Hawaii, 1 September 1930
- Hickam Field, Hawaii, 1 February 1940
- Wheeler Field, Hawaii, 20 December 1941 – 19 July 1942 (operated from Midway Island, 30 May – 2 June and c. 8 June 1942)
- Efate Airfield, Efate, New Hebrides, 25 July 1942

Forward echelon operated from: Turtle Bay Airfield, Espiritu Santo, New Hebrides, August 1942
Forward echelon operated from: Henderson Field (Guadalcanal), September 1942

- Pekoa Airfield, Espiritu Santo, New Hebrides, 22 December 1942 – 28 March 1943 (forward echelon operated from: Dobodura Airfield Complex, New Guinea, January 1943)
- Bellows Field, Hawaii, 12 April 1943
- Wheeler Field, Hawaii, 11 May 1943 (operated from Canton Island Airport, Phoenix Islands, August–September 1943)
- Nukufetau Airfield, Ellice Islands, 11 November 1943 (air echelon operated from Canton Island Airfield, Phoenix Islands, 12 November – 31 December 1943)
- Hawkins Field (Tarawa), Gilbert Islands, 25 January 1944 (air echelon operated from Eniwetok Atoll Airfield, Marshall Islands, 29 March – 17 April 1944)
- Kwajalein Airfield, Marshall Islands, 14 April 1944

Air echelon operated from Eniwetok Atoll Airfield, Marshall Islands, July 1944

- Agana Airfield, Guam, Northern Marianas Islands, 21 October 1944
- Yontan Airfield, Okinawa, Ryukyu Islands, 2 July 1945
- Fort William McKinley, Luzon, Philippines, 13 December 1945
- Northwest Field (Guam), Northern Marianas Islands, 15 May 1946
- Harmon Field (later Harmon Air Force Base), Guam, Northern Marianas Islands, 1 May 1947 – 20 October 1948
- Carswell Air Force Base, Texas, 1 December 1948 (deployed at Nouasseur Air Base, French Morocco, 28 June – 29 July 1954 and 3 May – 3 July 1955)
- Altus Air Force Base, Oklahoma, 13 December 1957 – 2 July 1968 (deployed at Clinton-Sherman Air Force Base, Oklahoma, 13 August – 25 Nov 1958)
- Clark Air Base, Philippines, 30 September 1973
- Kadena Air Base, Japan, 1 October 1988 – 21 February 1990
- Schriever Air Force Base, Colorado, 1 October 2003 – present

=== Aircraft ===
- Dayton-Wright DH-4, 1921-1924
- Included various experimental models including the "flying tank," 1921-1924
- Curtiss A-3 Falcon, 1930–1936
- Boeing PW-9, 1931
- Curtiss A-12 Shrike, 1936–1939
- Douglas B-18 Bolo, 1940–1942
- Boeing B-17 Flying Fortress, 1941–1943
- Consolidated B-24 Liberator, 1943–1945
- Convair B-36 Peacemaker, 1949–1957
- Boeing B-52 Stratofortress, 1958–1968
- Northrop T-38 Talon, 1975–1980
- Northrop F-5E Tiger II, 1977–1988
- Lockheed T-33 T-Bird, 1986–1987
- McDonnell Douglas F-15 Eagle (borrowed), 1988-1989
- General Dynamics F-16 Fighting Falcon (borrowed), 1988-1989

=== Campaigns ===
- World War I: Theater of Operations
- World War II: Central Pacific; Air Offensive, Japan; Papua; Guadalcanal; Northern Solomons; Eastern Mandates; Western Pacific; Ryukyus; China Offensive; Air Combat, Asiatic-Pacific Theater

=== Decorations ===
- Distinguished Unit Citation South Pacific, 31 July-30 November 1942
- Navy Presidential Unit Citation Pacific Theater, 7 August-9 December 1942
- Air Force Outstanding Unit Awards:

6 August 1954 – 15 July 1957
27 October 1958 – 16 September 1960
1 May 1980 – 30 April 1982
22 March-1 April 1986
1 June 1987 – 31 May 1989

== See also ==
- List of American Aero Squadrons
- List of B-52 Units of the United States Air Force
