= Franklin Barney Bellows =

American soldier (1896–1918)

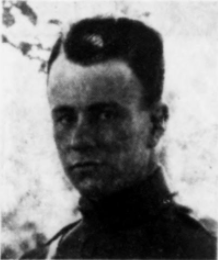
Frank Barney Bellows circa 1918

Lt. Franklin Barney Bellows (July 9, 1896 – September 13, 1918) was an American soldier of World War I. Bellows Air Force Station in the U.S. state of Hawaii is named in his honor.

A son of John Austin and Cora Barney Bellows, he grew up in Evanston and Kenilworth, Illinois. Bellows graduated from New Trier High School and Northwestern University, and "enlisted in the first officer's training camp at Fort Sheridan. In November 1917, he was assigned to the 50th Aero Squadron." While flying "early in the morning of the second day of the St. Mihiel offensive in spite of low clouds, high winds, and mist, flying at an altitude of only 300 meters, and without protection of accompanying battle planes" Bellows' plane was hit with machine gun fire and he "died in the line of duty after securing crucial information on a reconnaissance mission in France." Bellows was the observer; the pilot David C. Beebe survived the mission and returned the plane back behind allied lines.

According to a government statement released at the time of the renaming:

Early in the morning of 13 September 1918, he departed with 2nd. Lt. D. C. Beebe, the pilot on a reconnaissance mission over the lines for the 82nd Division of the 1st Corps, First Army, in the Saint Mihiel section. While flying over enemy territory at an altitude of more than 300 meters because of low-lying clouds, their aircraft received machine gun fire and anti-aircraft fire from the ground. Lt. Bellows was hit three times by machine gun bullets, which caused his death a few minutes later. Lt. Beebe succeeded in returning safely to the rear of the allied lines, landing at Brin northeast of Nancy.

Bellows was awarded the Distinguished Service Cross and the Croix de Guerre. He is buried in the American Military Cemetery in Saint-Mihiel, France. On August 19, 1933, the airfield at Waimanalo Military Reservation, Territory of Hawaii was named in his honor.
