= Bellows Air Force Station =

U.S. military reservation in Waimanalo, Hawaii

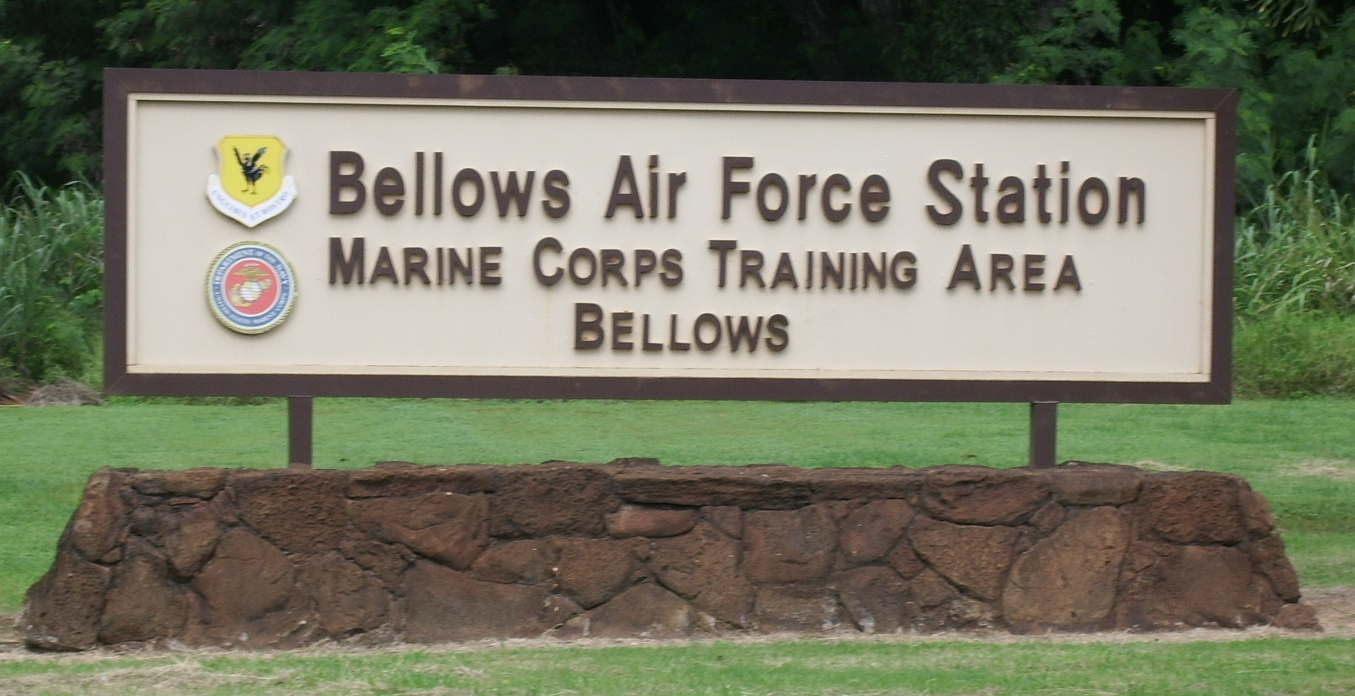
- This is the sign located at the entrance to Bellows Air Force Station in Hawaii.

Location
- Location within Hawaii
- Coordinates: 21°22′08.71″N 157°42′40.12″W

Bellows Air Force Station (Bellows Field) is a United States military reservation located in Waimanalo, Hawaii. Once an important air field during World War II, the reservation now serves as a military training area and recreation area for active and retired military and civilian employees of the Department of Defense. Bellows AFS is operated by Detachment 2, 18th Mission Support Group based at Kadena Air Base, Okinawa, Japan. Located on the opposite side of Oahu is the similar Pililaau Army Recreation Center, part of the Armed Forces Recreation Centers system.

== History ==
Created in 1917 as the Waimänalo Military Reservation on a former sugarcane plantation, the base was renamed Bellows Field in 1933 after Lt. Franklin Barney Bellows, a World War I pilot who was awarded the Distinguished Service Cross. Bellows Field was made a permanent military post in July 1941, and it was one of the airfields targeted during the attack on Pearl Harbor on December 7, 1941. The attack at Bellows Field killed two United States Army Air Forces airmen—George Allison Whiteman and Hans C. Christiansen—and injured six others. One B-17 bomber ("Skipper" 40–2049) was forced to land at Bellows during the attack when Japanese aircraft activity made landing at Hickam Field impossible.

=== Post-war ===
Bellows Field was used for recreational gliders in the late 1950s and early 1960s. A truck would tow a glider into the air, then the glider pilot would release the tow cable and then catch updrafts from the prevailing wind blowing inshore and deflecting upwards from the very nearby mountains. In this way the pilot could keep the glider in the air as long as desired.

Bellows AFS was also the Air Force transmitter-facility site for long-haul high-frequency radio communications from the late 1950s until HF radio was largely replaced by the military satellite program. HF radio links were established using highly directional Sloping "V" antennas to Clark Air Base, Philippines, and McClellan AFB, California. Message circuits were originated or relayed at Hickam AFB, near Pearl Harbor, and sent to Bellows for re-transmission over the HF systems. The receiver site was geographically separated from the transmitter site to prevent RF interference from the high-power transmitters.

== Bellows Air Force Station ==
In 1958, the last runways were decommissioned and the flying field status was terminated. Subsequently, Bellows was renamed to Bellows Air Force Station with a primary mission as an Armed Forces Recreation Center. As a Recreation Center, Bellows AFS provides beachfront cabins, camping, and limited condominium style apartments for active duty, reserve, and retired military personnel to stay in. Additionally, there is a small AAFES Express shopette, a paintball course, and Turtle Cove outdoor adventure program office.

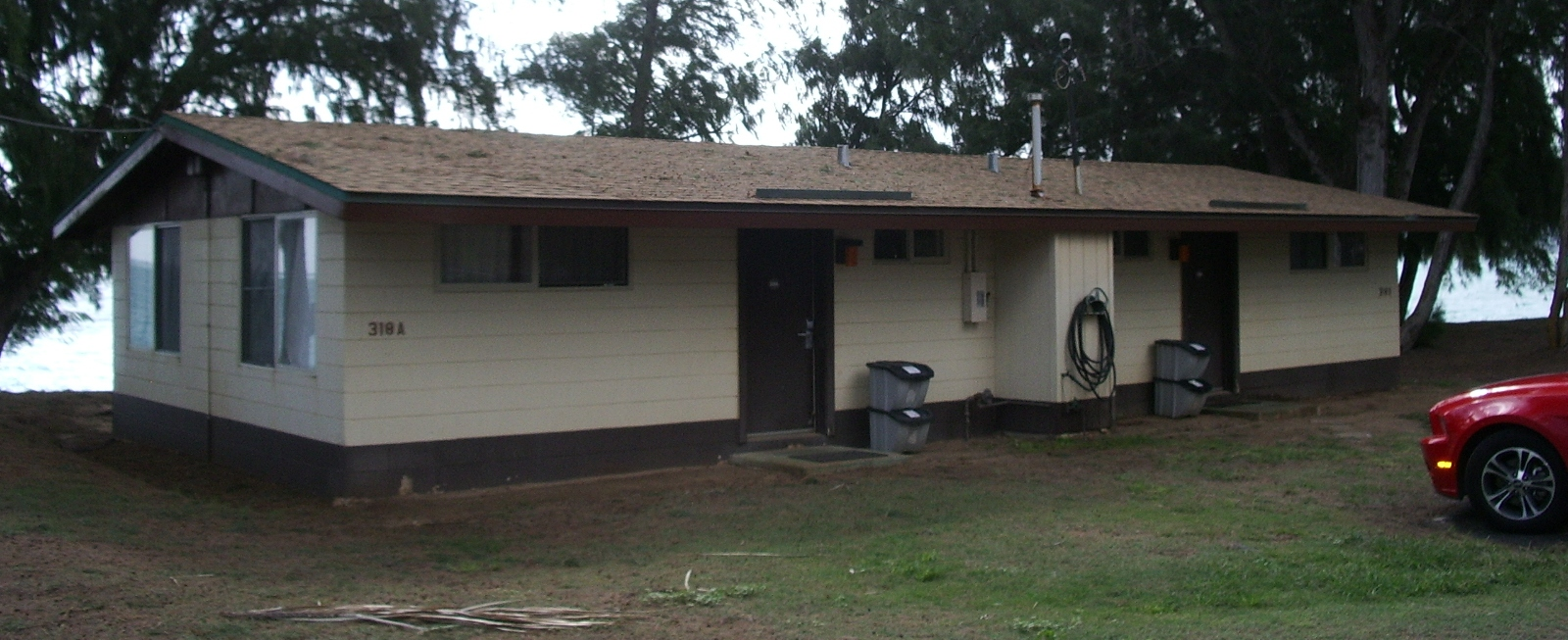
Front view of duplex cabin at Bellows AFS, Hawaii.

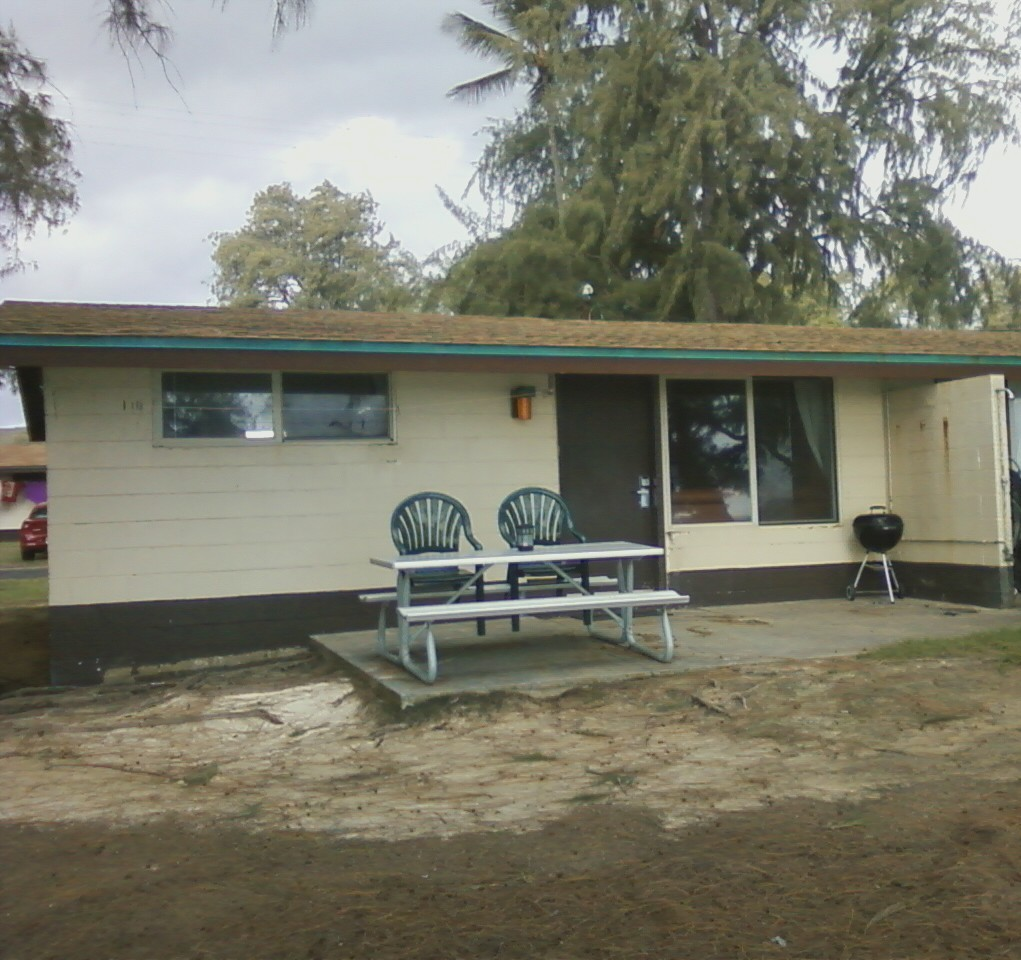
View of rear of duplex cabin at Bellows AFS, Hawaii. Cabins come with charcoal barbecues, picnic tables and chairs.

=== Marine Corps Training Area Bellows ===
The Marine Corps acquired approximately 1,049 acres (4.25 km^{2}) of Bellows from the Air Force in 1999. The Marine Corps Training Area Bellows is now part of Marine Corps Base Hawaii, headquartered in Kaneohe Bay. MCTAB adds significant training capabilities and maneuver space for non-live fire military training activities. The Marines and other services use the training areas to conduct amphibious, helicopter, and motorized exercises in conjunction with troop land maneuver training. It is currently the only place in Hawaii where amphibious landings can transition directly into maneuver training areas for realistic military training.

Recent improvements to the training area over the old runway include construction of a forward operating base (FOB) mock-up around the old building. 700, Bldg. 700 renovations, and a modular military operations in urban terrain (MOUT) training system that consists of 74 buildings (made from shipping containers) on four separate sites. Additional containers have been moved into the main training area to be used as part of a combat vehicle operators' course for Marines to simulate driving in real-world conditions.

=== Hawaii Army National Guard 298th Regiment, MFTU (RTI) ===
The 298th Regiment, Multi-Functional Training Unit (MFTU), Regional Training Institute (RTI) is part of the Army's Training and Doctrine Command (TRADOC) Army School System. The headquarters and 1st and 2nd Battalions are located at Bellows Air Force Station in Waimanalo, Hawaii. The Ordnance Training Company is located at the Regional Training Site Maintenance (RTSM) facilities in Pearl City, Hawaii.

The RTI is accredited by various agencies, including TRADOC, the U.S. Army Sergeants Major Academy, active duty proponent schools for the various military occupational specialties, and the U.S. Army Ordnance Center.

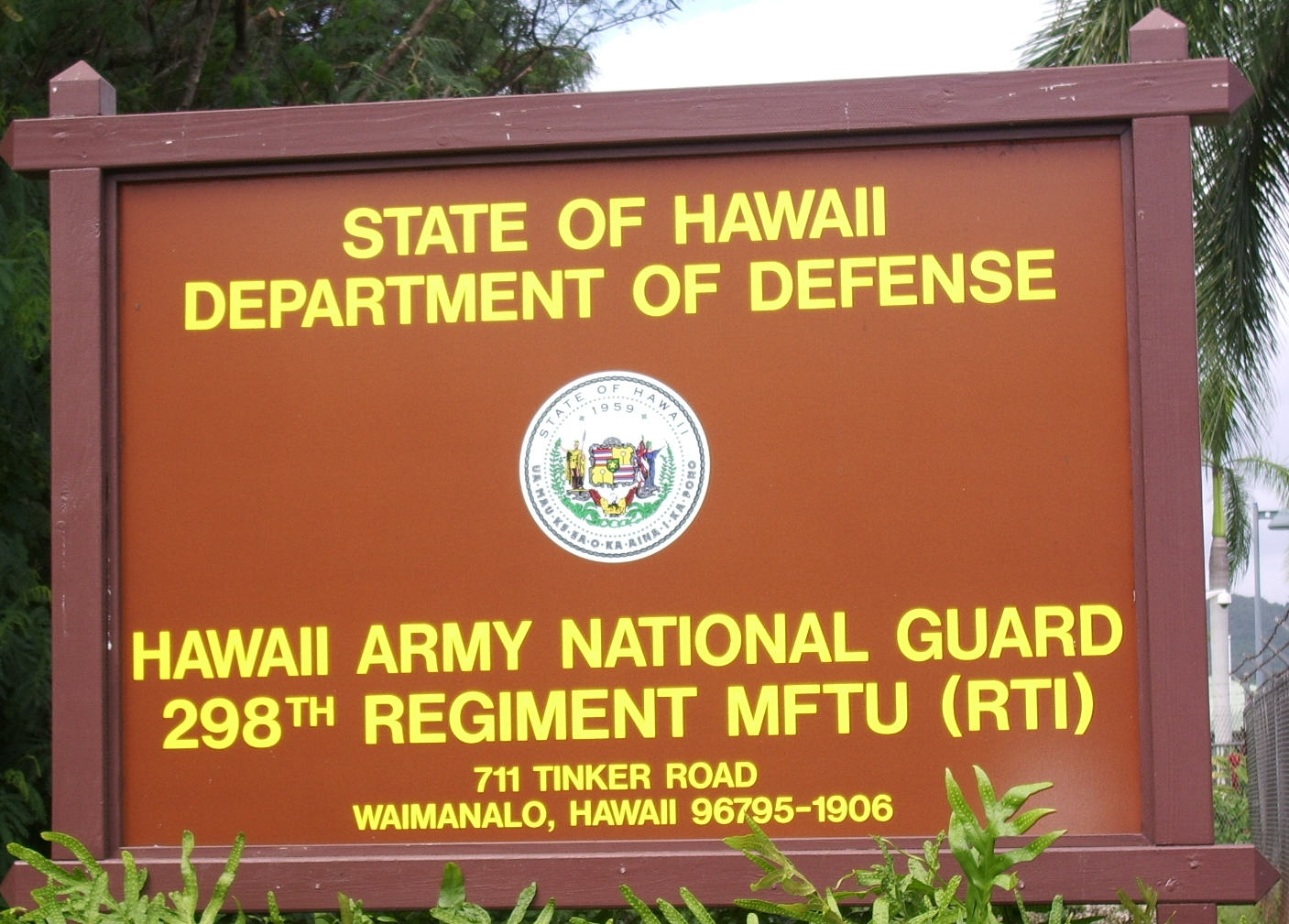
The Hawaii Army National Guard 298th Regiment, Regional Training Institute located on Bellows Air Force Station, Hawaii.

== History and ecology ==
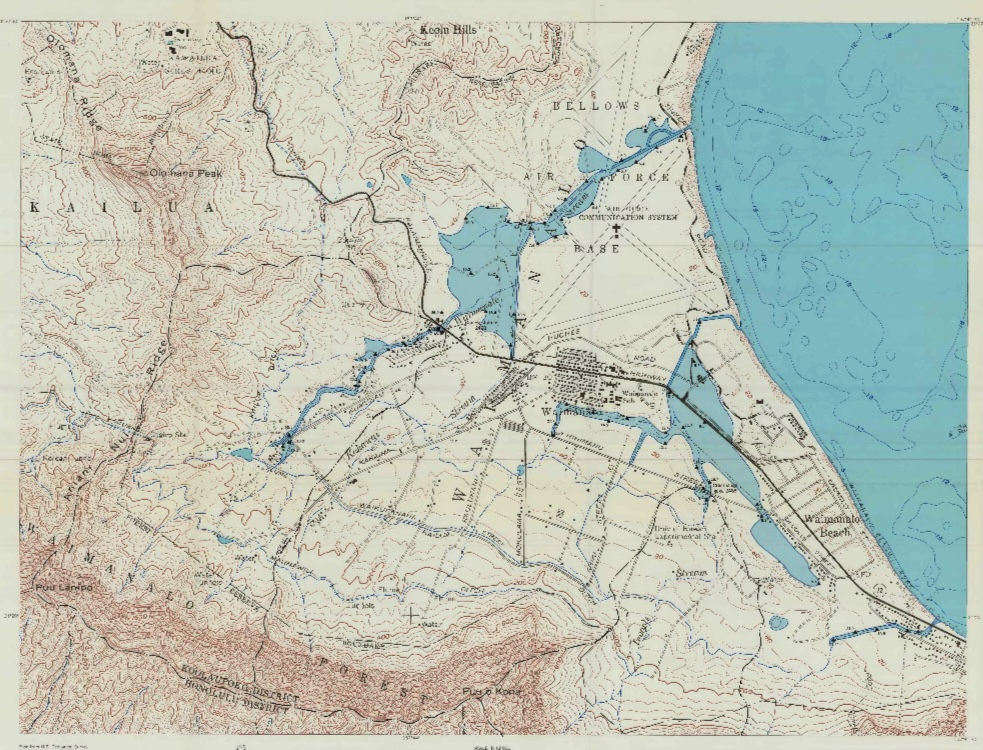
1968 USGS flood map, Bellows Air Force Station

Bellows Japanese Cemetery is a historic Japanese cemetery on the base. The cemetery is excluded from military use. Marine Corps research has identified 57 burials with approximately 45 grave markers. The markers are primarily written in Japanese. The death dates of the dead are primarily in the 1910s; the most recent burial was 1943.

The U.S. Department of Defense has organized removal of invasive ironwood trees. The base command is also working on sand dune restoration in order to minimize beach erosion.

The Nation of Hawaiʻi organization at Puʻuhonua o Waimānalo village is working to restore the indigenous Ahupuaʻa watershed-management system upstream from the base.

== See also ==
- Hawaii World War II Army Airfields
