= 926th Wing =

Air Reserve Component of the United States Air Force

926th Wing

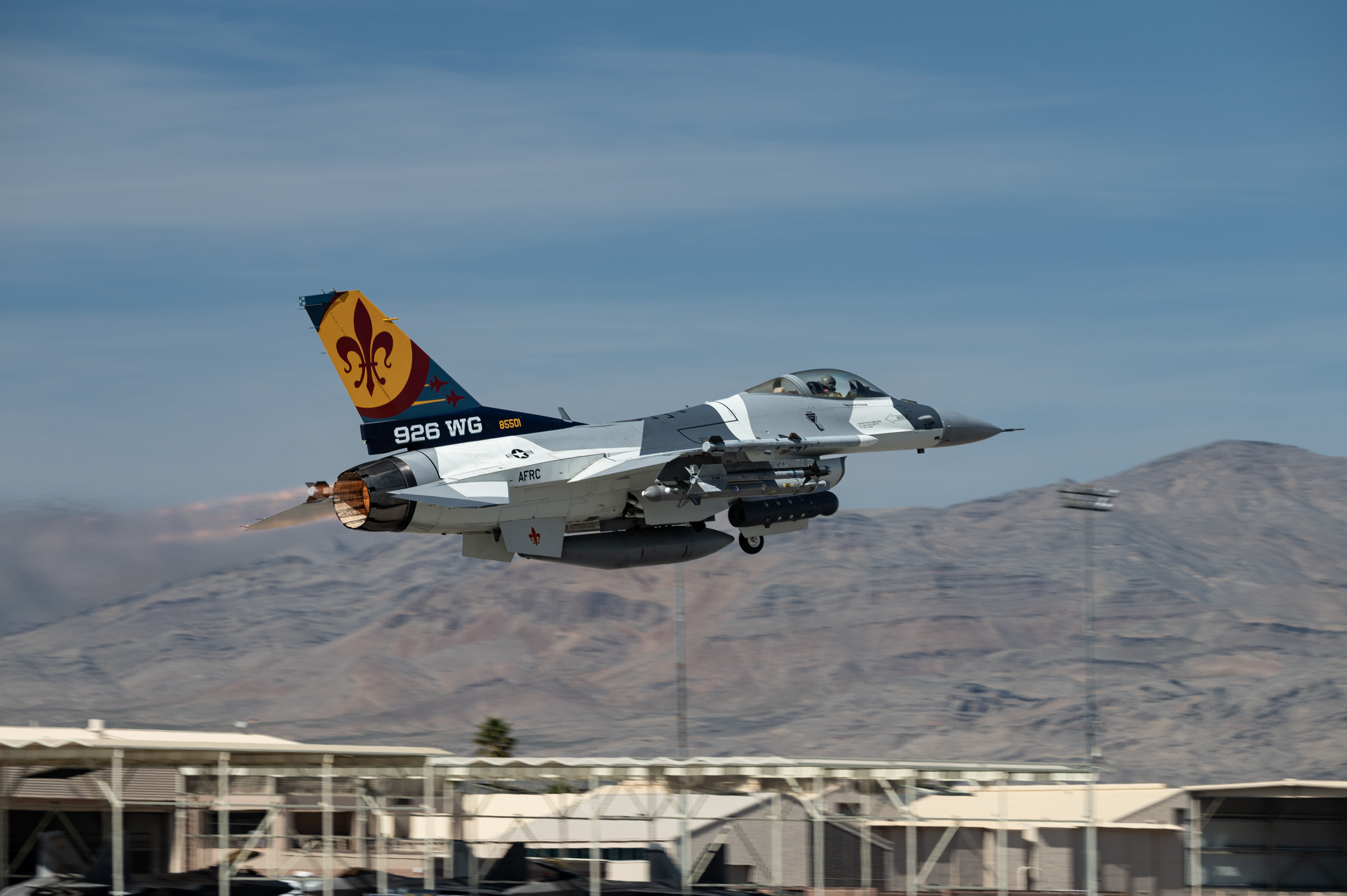
- An F-16 Aggressor assigned to the 706th Aggressor Squadron takes off for Red Flag mission at Nellis AFB, Nevada, March 12, 2024.
- Active: 1963–present
- Country: United States
- Branch: United States Air Force
- Type: Wing
- Role: Composite
- Part of: Air Force Reserve Command
- Garrison/HQ: Nellis Air Force Base, Nevada
- Nickname: Cajun
- Anniversaries: 50th Anniversary (December 12, 2012)
- Decorations: Air Force Outstanding Unit Award with Combat "V" Device; Air Force Outstanding Unit Award Republic of Vietnam Gallantry Cross with Palm

Insignia
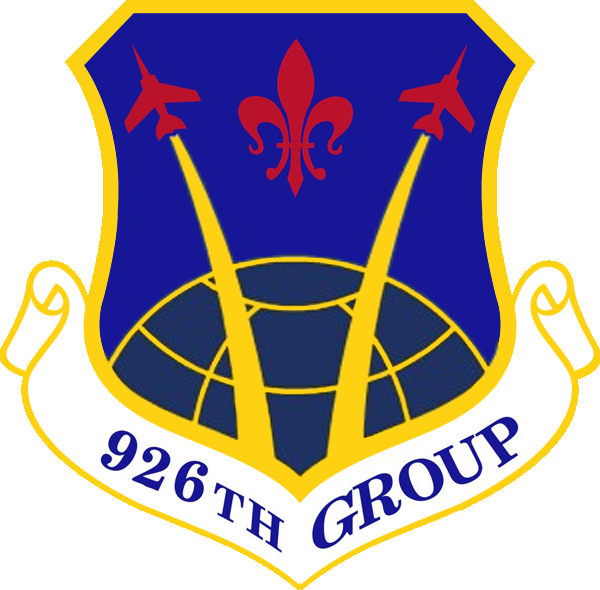
- 926th Wing emblem (Note: Approved 22 November 1982.)
- Tail code: WA, LV

Aircraft flown
- Fighter: F-16 Fighting Falcon; F-22 Raptor; F-35 Lightning
- Reconnaissance: MQ-9 Reaper; MQ-1 Predator

The 926th Wing is an Air Reserve Component of the United States Air Force. It is assigned to the Tenth Air Force, Air Force Reserve Command, stationed at Nellis Air Force Base, Nevada.

The unit is a composite organization consisting of two Operations Groups, the 726th and 926th, gained by Air Combat Command and Air Force Space Command, with geographically separated units at Creech Air Force Base, Nevada; Eglin Air Force Base, Florida, and Schriever Air Force Base, Colorado.

== Overview ==
The 926th Wing is an associate unit to the United States Air Force Warfare Center (USAFWC) at Nellis AFB. The unit provides reservists to the USAFWC as sustained expertise integrated at the operational and tactical levels of warfare. It continuously conducts combat operations, operational test and evaluation, tactics development, and advanced training to warfighters.

The 926th Wing's 726th Operations Group supports the U.S. Air Force's first Unmanned Aircraft Systems wing, the 432d Wing, equipped with more than 100 MQ-1 Predator and MQ-9 Reaper unmanned aircraft, in its mission to train pilots, sensor operators and other unmanned aircraft crewmembers, and conduct combat surveillance and attack operations worldwide.

== Units ==
The 926th Wing consists of two Operations Groups located at Nellis and Creech Air Force Bases:

- 726th Operations Group (Creech AFB, NV)
  - 13th Reconnaissance Squadron (Beale AFB, CA)
  - 78th Attack Squadron
  - 91st Attack Squadron
  - 429th Attack Squadron (Holloman AFB, NM)
- 926th Operations Group (Nellis AFB)
  - 14th Test Squadron (Schriever AFB, CO)
  - 26th Space Aggressor Squadron (Schriever AFB, CO)
  - 84th Test and Evaluation Squadron (Eglin AFB, FL)
  - 379th Space Range Squadron (Schriever AFB, CO)
  - 460th Test and Evaluation Squadron
  - 706th Aggressor Squadron
- 926th Aircraft Maintenance Squadron
- 926th Force Support Squadron
- 926th Aerospace Medicine Squadron
- 926th Civil Engineer Flight
- 926th Security Forces Squadron

== History ==
=== Need for reserve troop carrier groups ===
After May 1959, the reserve flying force consisted of 45 troop carrier squadrons assigned to 15 troop carrier wings. (Note: There were an additional four rescue squadrons not assigned to the wings. Cantwell, p. 156.) The squadrons were not all located with their parent wings, but were spread over thirty-five USAF, U.S. Navy and civilian airfields under what was called the Detached Squadron Concept. The concept offered several advantages. Communities were more likely to accept the smaller squadrons than the large wings and the location of separate squadrons in smaller population centers would facilitate recruiting and manning. However, under this concept, all support organizations were located with the wing headquarters. Although this was not a problem when the entire wing was called to active service, mobilizing a single flying squadron and elements to support it proved difficult. This weakness was demonstrated in the partial mobilization of reserve units during the Berlin Crisis of 1961. To resolve this, at the start of 1962, Continental Air Command, (ConAC) determined to reorganize its reserve wings by establishing groups with support elements for each of its troop carrier squadrons. This reorganization would facilitate mobilization of elements of wings in various combinations when needed.

=== Activation of the 926th Troop Carrier Group ===
As a result, the 926th Troop Carrier Group was activated at Naval Air Station New Orleans, Louisiana on 17 January 1963 as the headquarters for the 706th Troop Carrier Squadron, which had been stationed there since May 1961. Along with group headquarters, a combat support squadron, materiel squadron and a tactical infirmary were organized to support the 68th.

If mobilized, the group was gained by Tactical Air Command (TAC), which was also responsible for its training. Its mission was to organize, recruit and train Air Force reservists in the tactical airlift of airborne forces, their equipment and supplies and delivery of these forces and materials by airdrop, landing or cargo extraction systems.

In 1967, the unit designation was changed to the 926th Tactical Airlift Group, reflecting broader airlift capabilities to include transporting equipment and supplies for deployments worldwide.

In 1969, the 926th experienced another conversion as it transitioned to the Lockheed C-130 Hercules. In October 1972, members of the 926th flew two C-130 aircraft into South Vietnam as part of the USAF-wide program designed to provide the South Vietnamese with increased cargo capability before the Vietnam War came to an end.

In 1975, with the divestment of all C-130 tactical airlift aircraft from TAC, the gaining command for the 926 TAG was changed to the Military Airlift Command.

=== Conversion to fighter aircraft ===
In 1977, the Air Force announced the 926th would convert to the Cessna A-37 Dragonfly fighter aircraft, bringing with the conversion a combat mission and a new designation, the 926th Tactical Fighter Group, and a return to TAC as its gaining command. The 926th continued to fly the A-37 until June 1982 when the group completed a conversion to the Fairchild Republic A-10 Thunderbolt II.

=== Gulf War ===
When Iraq invaded Kuwait in 1990, the 926th Group began deploying people and A-10 aircraft in support of Operation Desert Shield. Then, in December 1990, approximately 450 members of the 926th were recalled to active duty in support of Operation Desert Shield and Operation Desert Storm as the nation's first Air Force Reserve combat unit recalled to active duty.

=== Deployments ===
In February 1992, the unit was redesignated as the 926th Fighter Group. The name change reflected the inactivation of TAC and the establishment of its successor organization, Air Combat Command (ACC). The group began conversion from the A-10 to the General Dynamics F-16 Fighting Falcon, which was complete by October that year. Two years later, on 1 October 1994, the unit officially became the 926th Fighter Wing.

In 1995, the wing converted back to the A/OA-10 Thunderbolt II aircraft. The conversion was completed and the unit became combat-ready in September 1997.

In the late 1990s, the 926th participated in deployments patrolling the no-fly zones over Iraq, in support of Operation Deny Flight, Operations Northern Watch and Southern Watch, and in 1999 returned to Kuwait to participate in Aerospace Expeditionary Force One.

After the terrorist attacks of 11 September 2001, members of the 926th Fighter Wing were mobilized and deployed to various locations worldwide in support of Operation Enduring Freedom and Operation Noble Eagle.

=== Move to Nellis Air Force Base ===
The 2005 Base Realignment and Closure Commission identified the 926th Fighter Wing for inactivation, with personnel and aircraft relocating to four bases. The damage caused to Naval Air Station Joint Reserve Base New Orleans by Hurricane Katrina in 2005 accelerated the process from two and a half years to nine months. By the spring of 2006, the wing's A-10s were transferred to the 442nd Fighter Wing at Whiteman Air Force Base, Missouri, and the since inactivated 917th Fighter Group at Barksdale Air Force Base, Louisiana, while logistics readiness support moved to Buckley Air Force Base, Colorado.

In October 2007, the 926th Group headquarters moved to Nellis Air Force Base, Nevada. With the growth of the Air Force Reserve Command support to the USAF Air Warfare Center, the 926th Group was redesignated the 926th Wing on 5 December 2014. At the same time, two Operations Groups were activated to command the thirteen associated reserve squadrons.

== Lineage ==
- Established as the 926th Troop Carrier Group, Medium and activated on 28 December 1962 (not organized)

Organized in the Reserve on 17 January 1963
Redesignated 926th Tactical Airlift Group on 1 July 1967
Redesignated 926th Tactical Fighter Group on 1 April 1978
Redesignated 926th Fighter Group on 1 February 1992
Redesignated 926th Fighter Wing on 1 October 1994
Redesignated 926th Group on 17 August 2007
Redesignated 926th Wing on 5 December 2014

=== Assignments ===
- Continental Air Command, 28 December 1962 (not organized)
- 446th Troop Carrier Wing (later 446th Tactical Airlift Wing), 17 January 1963
- 433d Tactical Airlift Wing (later 433d Military Airlift Wing), 1 March 1968
- 446th Tactical Airlift Wing, 1 October 1969
- 442d Tactical Airlift Wing, 1 July 1972
- 434th Tactical Fighter Wing, 1 January 1978
- 442d Tactical Fighter Wing, 1 February 1984
- 917th Tactical Fighter Wing (later 917th Fighter Wing), 1 July 1987
- 301st Fighter Wing, 1 August 1992
- Tenth Air Force, 1 October 1994 – present

=== Components ===
Groups

- 726th Operations Group: 5 December 2014 – present

Creech Air Force Base, Nevada

- 926th Operations Group: 1 August 1992 – 17 August 2007, 5 December 2014 – present

Squadrons

- 26th Space Aggressor Squadron: 17 August 2007 – 5 December 2014
- 78th Reconnaissance Squadron: 17 August 2007 – 5 December 2014
- 706th Troop Carrier Squadron (later 706th Tactical Airlift Squadron, 706th Tactical Fighter Squadron, 706th Fighter Squadron, 706th Aggressor Squadron): 17 January 1963 – 1 August 1992; 17 August 2007 – 5 December 2014
- 926th Aircraft Maintenance Squadron
- 926th Force Support Squadron
- 926th Aerospace Medicine Squadron
- 926th Civil Engineer Flight

=== Stations ===
- Naval Air Station New Orleans, Louisiana, 17 January 1963
- Nellis Air Force Base, Nevada, 17 August 2007 – present

=== Aircraft ===
- Fairchild C-119 Flying Boxcar, 1963–1970
- Lockheed C-130 Hercules, 1969–1978
- Cessna A-37 Dragonfly, 1978–1982
- Fairchild Republic A-10 (later OA-10) Thunderbolt II, 1981–1992, 1996–2006
- General Dynamics F-16 Fighting Falcon, 1992-1996
