= USNS Pililaau =

United States Navy cargo ship

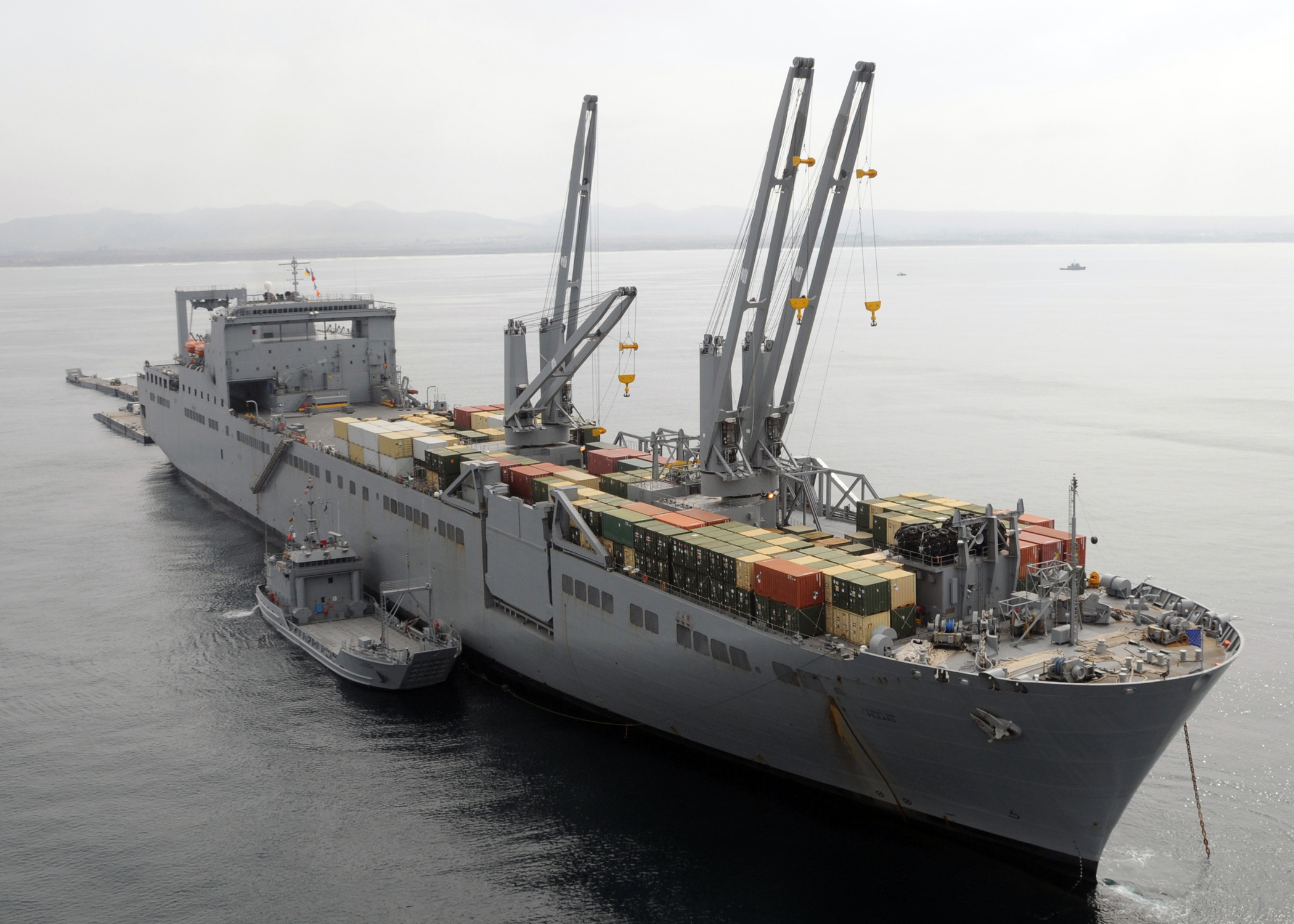
- Pililaau in 2008

History

United States
- Name: Pililaau
- Namesake: Herbert K. Pililaau
- Awarded: November 26, 1996
- Builder: Avondale Shipyards, New Orleans, Louisiana
- Laid down: June 29, 1998
- Launched: January 29, 2000
- Home port: Naval Air Station Joint Reserve Base New Orleans
- Identification: IMO number: 9178355; MMSI number: 338806000; Callsign: NBWY
- Honors and awards: 1 National Defense Service Medal
- Status: in active service

General characteristics
- Class & type: Bob Hope-class vehicle cargo ship
- Displacement: 62,070 tons full
- Length: 951 ft 5 in (290.0 m)
- Beam: 106 ft (32.3 m)
- Draft: 34 ft 10 in (10.6 m) maximum
- Propulsion: 4 × Colt Pielstick 10 PC4.2 V diesels; 65,160 hp(m) (47.89 MW)(Beloit, WI); Falk Gear Power Transmission (Milwaukee, WI); 2 × propellers
- Speed: 24 knots (44 km/h)
- Range: Not Disclosed
- Capacity: 380,000 sq ft (35,000 m^{2}) w/49,990 sq. ft. deck cargo
- Complement: 26 to 45 civilian crew; up to 50 active duty

USNS Pililaau (T-AKR 304) is the fifth Bob Hope-class vehicle cargo ship built by the Avondale Shipyards of New Orleans, Louisiana for the United States Navy. Pililaau is named after Private first class Herbert K. Pililaau, a Medal of Honor recipient.

== Service history ==
Pililaau is one of 19 and is part of the 16 ships in Military Sealift Command's Sealift Program Office. It is currently owned by the government, but run under a contract by a private company. The ship is kept in operational ready status (ROS-4) at all times. The ship is designed to be a multifunctional part of any fleet. It is capable of general cargo transportation, and also as a means to load and unload ships without the benefit of deep draft-capable, fixed port facilities. The ship was used throughout the Iraq and Afghanistan wars to transfer equipment to friendly ports in Europe to be brought into the combat theater.

The ship carries no fixed guns but may support a detachment of security forces for defense.

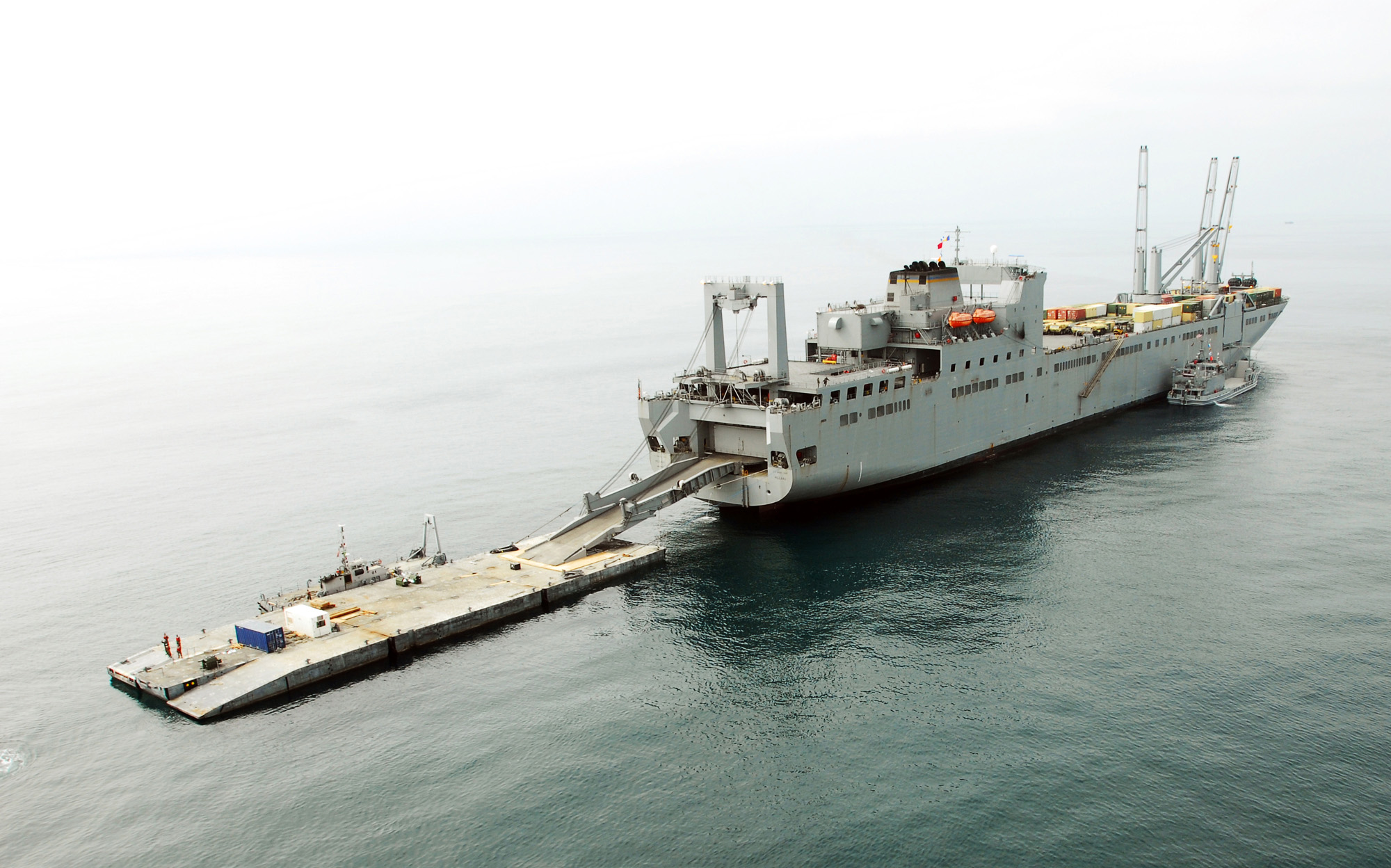
Pililaau deployed at Camp Pendleton

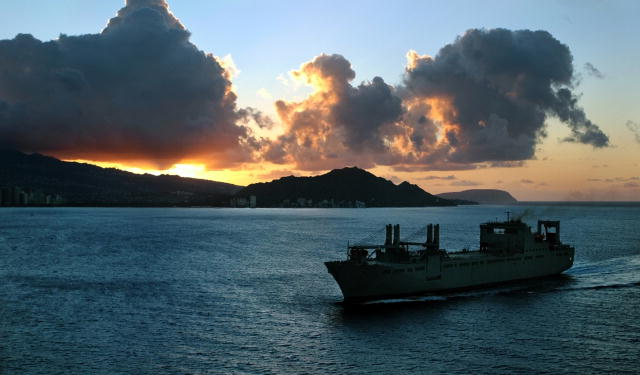
USNS Pililaau (T-AKR 304) passes Diamond Head Crater in Honolulu, Hawaii, July 12, 2008
