= 706th Aggressor Squadron =

706th Aggressor Squadron

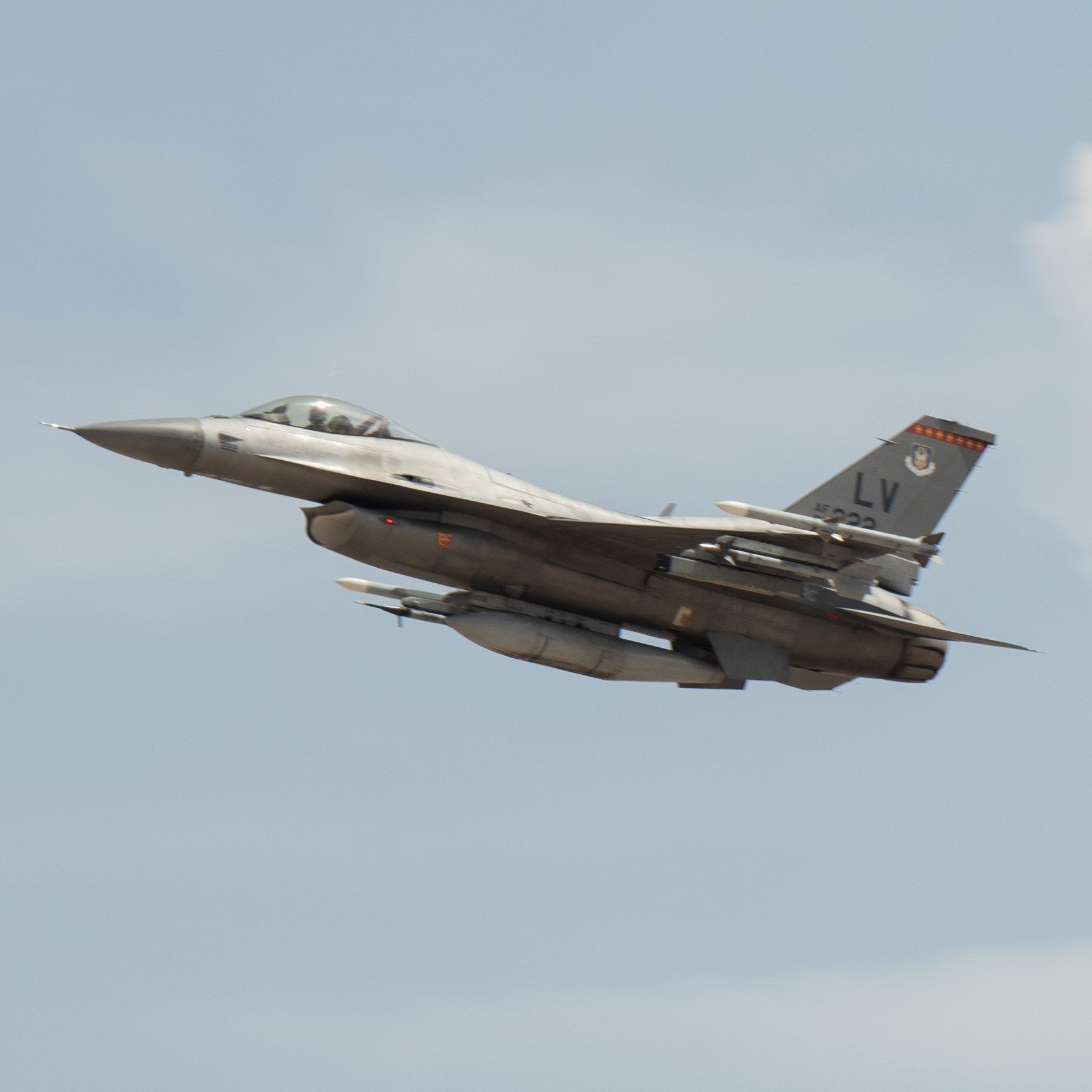
- 706th Aggressor F-16 Viper
- Active: 1943–1945; 1948–1949; 1955–1957; 1959–present
- Country: United States
- Branch: United States Air Force
- Role: Fighter aggressor training
- Part of: Air Force Reserve Command
- Garrison/HQ: Nellis Air Force Base, Nevada
- Nickname: Cajuns
- Engagements: European Theater of World War II; Gulf War
- Decorations: Air Force Outstanding Unit Award with Combat "V" Device; Air Force Outstanding Unit Award; Republic of Vietnam Gallantry Cross with Palm

Insignia
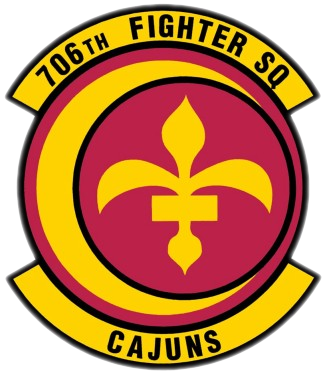
- 706th Fighter Squadron Emblem (Note: Approved 8 August 1996)

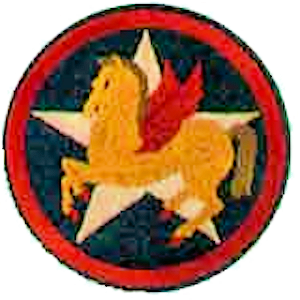
- 706th Bombardment Squadron emblem (World War II)
- Tail Code Squadron color: LV

Aircraft flown
- Fighter: F-16C Block 30

The 706th Aggressor Squadron is part of the 926th Wing at Nellis Air Force Base, Nevada where it oversees Air Force Reserve Command fighter pilots supporting the United States Air Force Warfare Center as an associate of the 57th Wing. Pilots assigned to the 706th fly General Dynamics F-16 Fighting Falcon aircraft.

The squadron was first activated as the 706th Bombardment Squadron in 1943. After training in the United States with Consolidated B-24 Liberators, it deployed to the European Theater of Operations, where it engaged in the strategic bombing campaign against Germany. After V-E Day, the squadron returned to the United States and was inactivated.

The squadron was activated in the reserve in 1948, but was inactivated in budget reductions in 1949. The squadron again became a reserve unit in 1955 as the 706th Troop Carrier Squadron, but was inactivated two years later. It was activated again in 1959 and has served as an airlift unit until 1978, which included training Republic of Vietnam Air Force crews in South Vietnam. Since 1978 the squadron has been a fighter unit, deploying to Bosnia and Southwest Asia on numerous occasions through 2007 when it assumed its current role. In May 2023, the squadron became an aggressor squadron.

== Mission ==
The 706th Aggressor Squadron is assigned to the 926th Operations Group at Nellis Air Force Base, Nevada. Its mission is to replicate threats from older fourth-generation fighters, using General Dynamics F-16C Fighting Falcon aircraft.

== History ==
=== World War II ===
==== Training for combat ====
The squadron was first activated on 1 April 1943 at Davis-Monthan Field, Arizona as the 706th Bombardment Squadron with an initial cadre drawn from the 39th Bombardment Group. It was one of the original squadrons of the 446th Bombardment Group. The cadre departed for Orlando Army Air Base, Florida for training with the Army Air Forces School of Applied Tactics, where they flew simulated combat missions from Montbrook AAF.

The unit headed for Alamogordo Army Air Field, New Mexico in June 1943, but was diverted to Lowry Field, Colorado, where the squadron was filled out and advanced training was completed. The ground echelon left Lowry on 18 October 1943 for Camp Shanks, New York and embarked on the RMS Queen Mary, sailing on 27 October 1943 and arrived in Greenock on the Firth of Clyde on 2 November 1943. The aircraft left Lowry on 20 October 1943 for staging at Lincoln Army Air Field, Nebraska. The aircrews ferried their planes under the control of Air Transport Command via the southern route from Florida through Puerto Rico, Brazil, Senegal, and Morocco to England. The 706th was part of the first United States Army Air Forces group to complete the Transatlantic hop from Brazil to Africa without the installation of additional bomb bay fuel tanks.

==== Combat in the European Theater ====
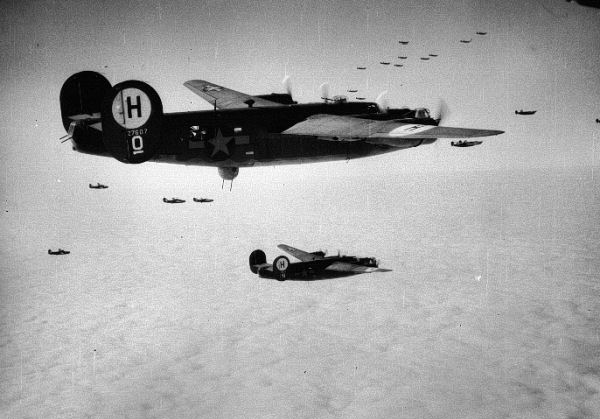
446th Bomb Group Liberators on their way to a target (Note: Identifiable is Convair B-24J Liberator, serial 42-100360. This aircraft was shot down 29 April 1944 on mission to Berlin.)

The squadron arrived at its new base at RAF Flixton in the east of England in October. The 706th flew its first mission on 16 December 1943 against shipping facilities in Bremen. The unit operated chiefly against strategic objectives. Its targets included U-boat installations at Kiel, the port at Bremen, a chemical plant at Ludwigshafen, ball-bearing works at Berlin, aircraft engine plants at Rostock, aircraft factories at Munich, marshalling yards at Coblenz, motor works at Ulm, and oil refineries at Hamburg.

Besides strategic missions, the 706th often carried out support and air interdiction operations. It supported the Normandy invasion in June 1944 by attacking strong points, bridges, airfields, transportation, and other targets in France. The squadron aided ground forces at Caen and Saint-Lô during July by hitting bridges, gun batteries, and enemy troops. It dropped supplies to Allied troops near Nijmegen during Operation Market-Garden in September. The unit bombed marshalling yards, bridges, and road junctions during the Battle of the Bulge in December 1944 and January 1945. It flew low level missions to drop medical supplies, arms, and food to airborne and ground troops near Wesel during Operation Varsity in March 1945. The 706th flew its last combat mission on 25 April, attacking a bridge near Salzburg, Austria.

After V-E Day, the 706th flew transport missions to France, sometimes landing at fields that had been targets the previous year. It also flew "Trolley" missions, transporting support personnel for "sightseeing" trips over Germany to view the results of their efforts. The squadron began to redeploy to the US in June 1945. The first aircraft of the air echelon departed the United Kingdom in mid-June 1945 flying the northern route via Iceland. The ground echelon sailed from Greenock on the Queen Mary on the sixth of July 1945 and arrived in New York on 11 July 1945. Personnel were given 30 days leave. The ground and air echelons reassembled at Sioux Falls Army Air Field, South Dakota in late July. Its personnel were transferred to other Second Air Force units or demobilized and the squadron was inactivated on 28 August 1945.

=== Reserve operations ===
==== Initial activation ====
The 706th Bombardment Squadron was activated again under Air Defense Command (ADC) in the reserves in March 1948 at Biggs Air Force Base, Texas. Shortly after the squadron was activated, in July 1948, Continental Air Command (ConAC) assumed reserve training responsibility from ADC. It was nominally a very heavy bombardment squadron, and was located with the regular 97th Bombardment Wing, a Boeing B-29 Superfortress unit, although it is not certain that it was equipped or fully manned. President Truman's reduced 1949 defense budget required reductions in the number of units in the Air Force. At the same time, ConAC was reorganizing its combat units according to the wing base organization system, and, as a result, the 706th was inactivated.

==== Airlift ====
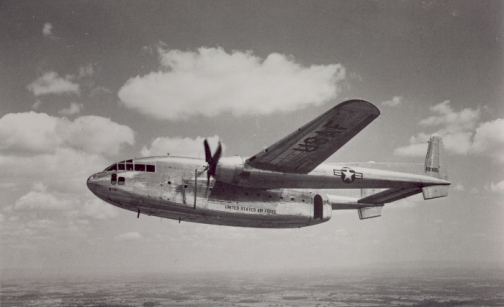
Air Force Reserve C-119

The squadron was reactivated in the reserves again in 1955 as the 706th Troop Carrier Squadron at Donaldson Air Force Base, South Carolina. It was not located with its parent wing, which was at Ellington Air Force Base, Texas. Its location was part of what was called the Detached Squadron Concept, which offered several advantages: communities were more likely to accept the smaller squadrons than the large wings and the location of separate squadrons in smaller population centers would facilitate recruiting and manning. At Donaldson, the 706th flew the Curtiss C-46 Commando. In the summer of 1956, the squadron participated in Operation Sixteen Ton during its two weeks of active duty training. Sixteen Ton was performed entirely by reserve troop carrier units and moved United States Coast Guard equipment From Floyd Bennett Naval Air Station to Isla Grande Airport in Puerto Rico and San Salvador in the Bahamas. The squadron was inactivated in 1957 and its mission, personnel and equipment were transferred to the 357th Troop Carrier Squadron.

The squadron was reactivated as a Fairchild C-119 Flying Boxcar reserve squadron at Barksdale Air Force Base in 1959. It moved to Naval Air Station New Orleans two years later, ironically absorbing the personnel and equipment of the 357th Squadron, which had moved from Donaldson to New Orleans in 1958. Again the squadron was detached from its parent wing. However, under the Detached Squadron Concept, support organizations remained with the wing. Although the dispersal of flying units was not a problem when the entire wing was called to active service, mobilizing a single flying squadron and elements to support it proved difficult. This weakness was demonstrated in the partial mobilization of reserve units during the Berlin Crisis of 1961. To resolve this, ConAC determined to reorganize its reserve wings by establishing groups with support elements for each of its troop carrier squadrons at the start of 1962. However, as this plan was entering its implementation phase, another partial mobilization occurred for the Cuban Missile Crisis. The formation of troop carrier groups was delayed until January 1963. This reorganization would facilitate mobilization of elements of wings in various combinations when needed. In January 1963, the 926th Troop Carrier Group was activated as the headquarters for the 705th and its support elements.

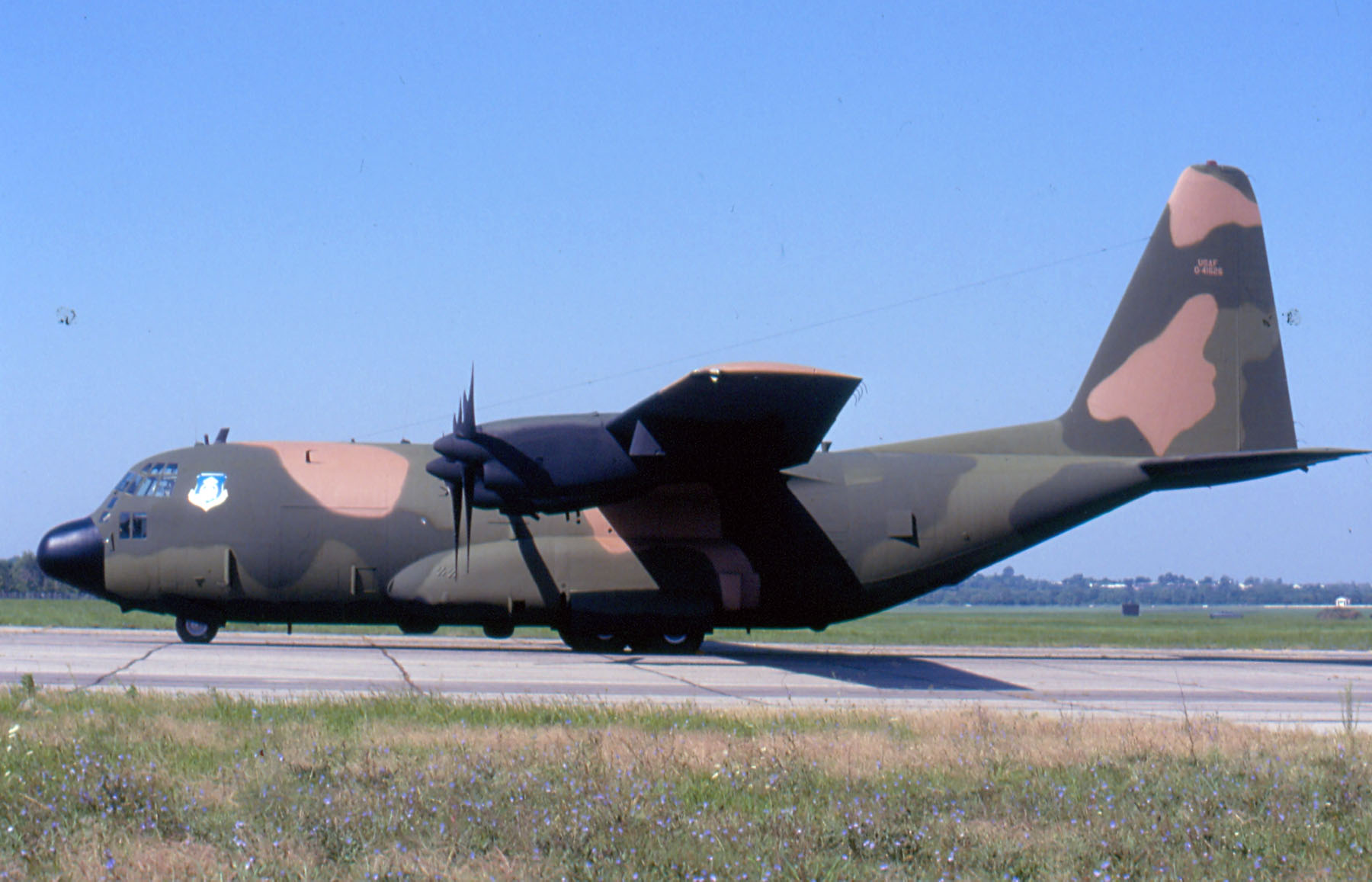
C-130 in Southeast Asia camouflage

It became a "Tactical Airlift" squadron in 1967, reflecting its broader mission that including transporting supplies and equipment in addition to troops. The squadron upgraded to Lockheed C-130 Hercules aircraft in 1969. In October 1972 the squadron deployed two C-130s to Viet Nam in a program to provide the Republic of Vietnam Air Force (VNAF) an airlift capability independent of the United States Air Force. It was awarded the Republic of Vietnam Gallantry Cross w/ Palm for its efforts.

==== Fighter operations ====
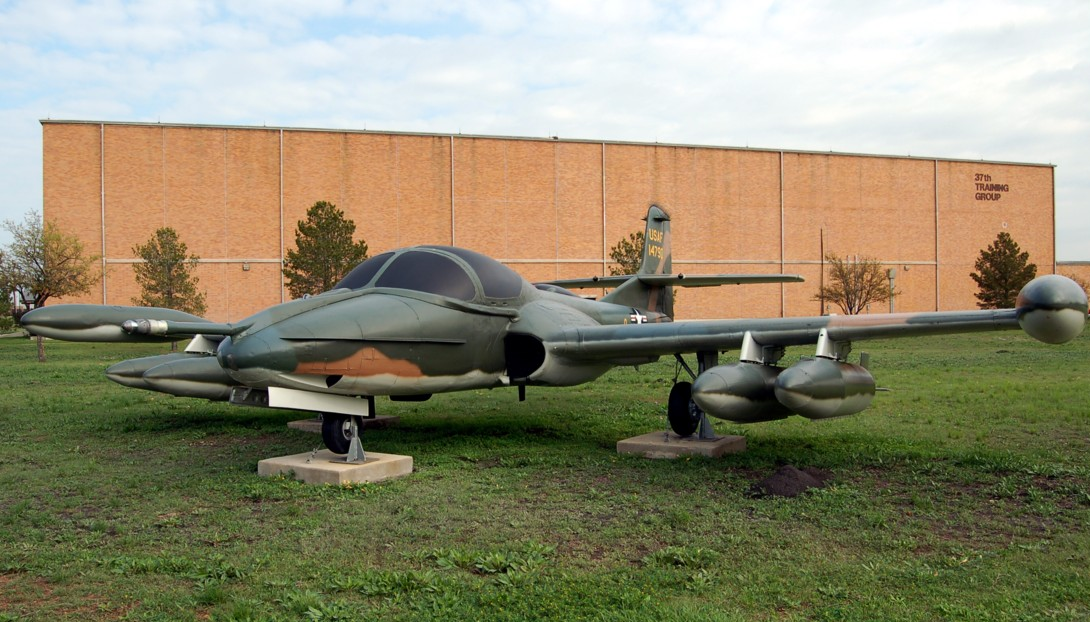
A-37 Dragonfly, first fighter flown by the 706th

In 1978 the squadron transitioned to the Cessna A-37 Dragonfly and was redesignated the 706th Tactical Fighter Squadron concentrating on close air support. It upgraded to the Fairchild Republic A-10 Thunderbolt II in 1982. In 1987 the squadron earned top honors in Tactical Air Command's Gunsmoke gunnery competition.

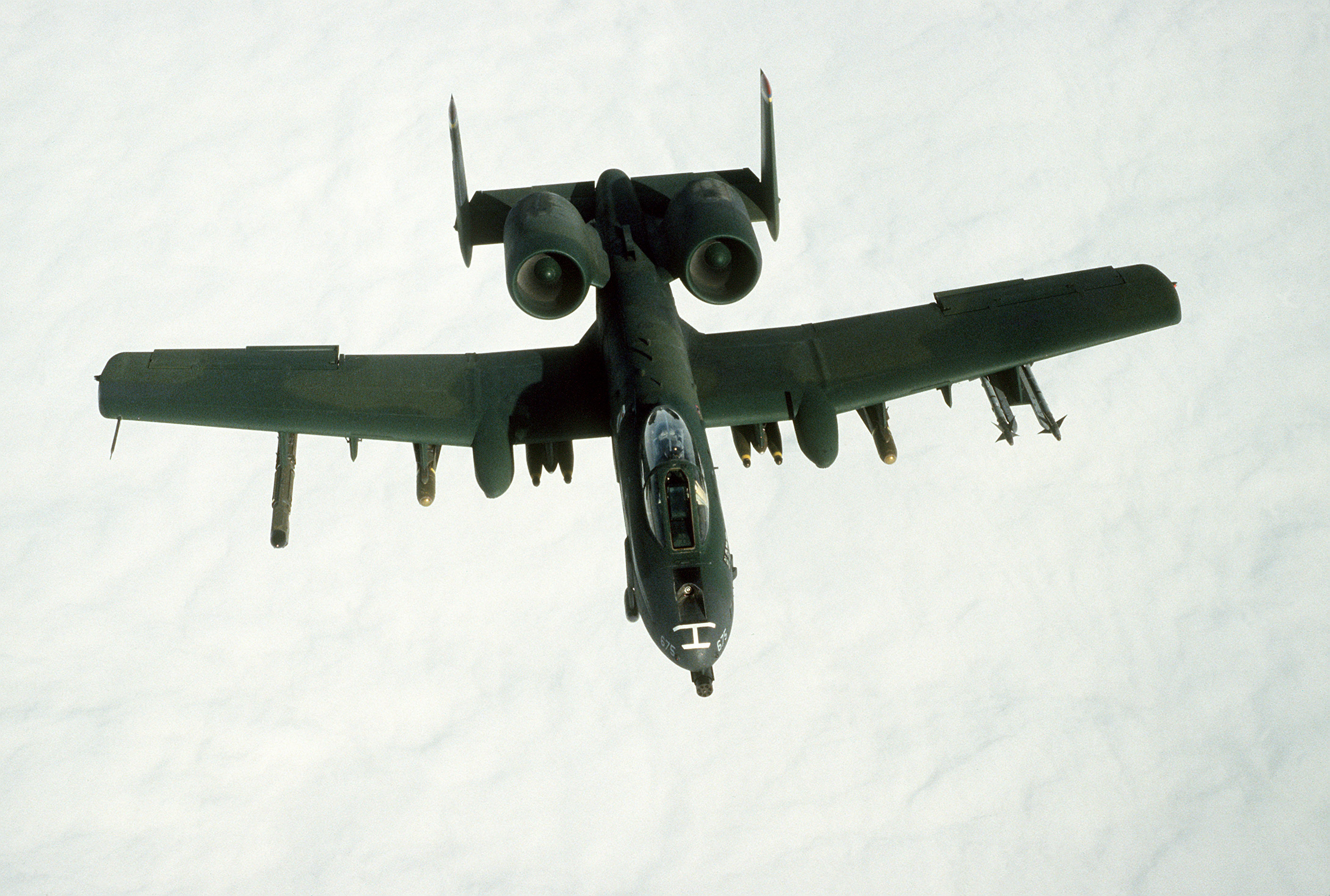
A-10 "Warthog" on a mission during Operation Desert Storm

The squadron was called to active duty for Operation Desert Shield in December 1990 and its first A-10s departed for Saudi Arabia on New Year's Day 1991. It flew combat in Southwest Asia as part of Operation Desert Storm, where deployed elements were attached to the Tactical Fighter Wing, Provisional, 354th until 25 March 1991 at King Fahd International Airport, Saudi Arabia. One of the squadron's pilots, Captain Bob Swain, scored the first aerial victory by a "Warthog" when he shot down an Iraqi Air Force helicopter. The squadron returned to the United States in May 1991

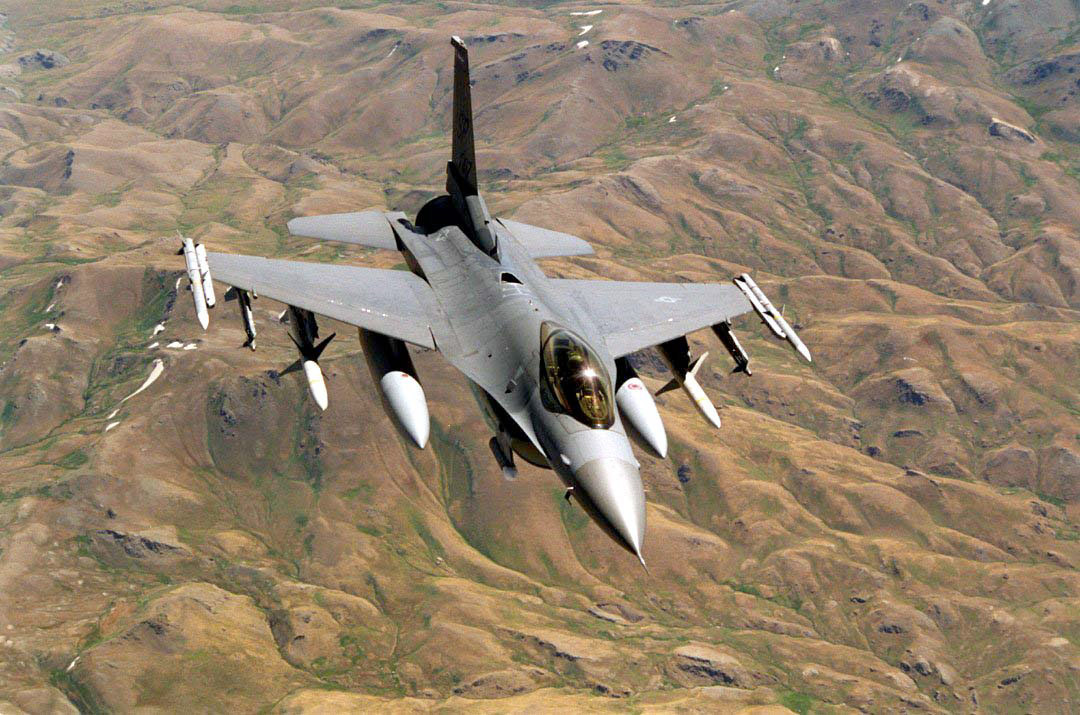
F-16 on patrol during Operation Northern Watch

The squadron converted to General Dynamics F-16 Fighting Falcon fighter operations, completing the transition in October 1992. With the Viper, the 706th participated in United Nations patrols to enforce a no-fly zone over Bosnia in March and April 1995 and over Iraq in Operation Northern Watch and Operation Southern Watch.

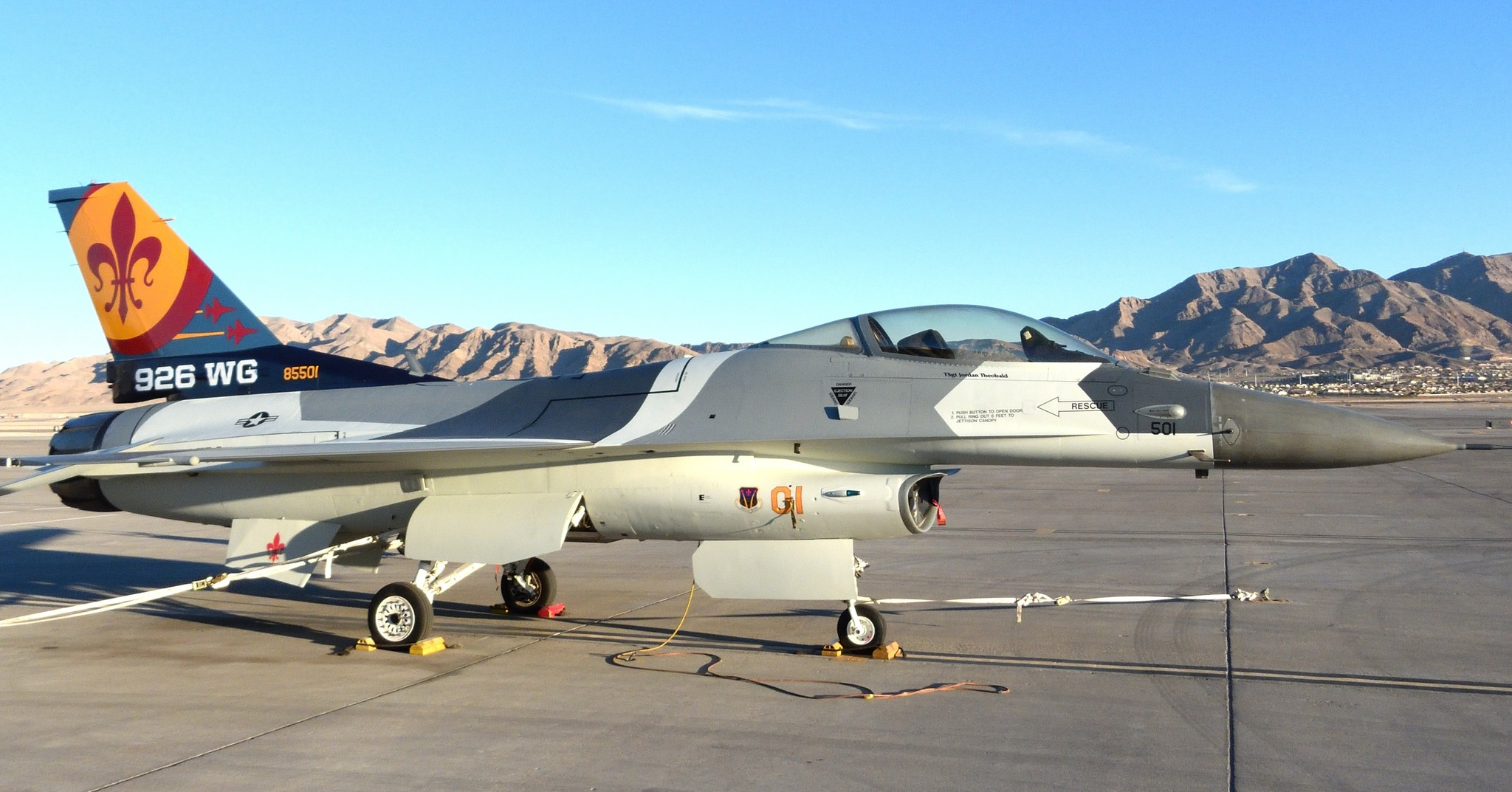
The first F-16C rolls out of the paint shop at Nellis AFB, Nevada, wearing an Aggressor paint scheme and the Wing Flagship tail markings.

In 1997 the squadron returned to flying A-10s, completing the transition in September. In 1999 it returned to Kuwait as part of Aerospace Expeditionary Force 1. It deployed elements as part of the 81st Expeditionary Fighter Squadron in 2002 at Bagram Air Base, Afghanistan in 2002 during Operation Enduring Freedom. It also supported Operation Noble Eagle, Operation Iraqi Freedom and Operation New Dawn. While supporting the relief efforts in the aftermath of Hurricane Katrina elements operated from Whiteman Air Force Base, Missouri and Barksdale Air Force Base, Louisiana in September 2005. In October 2007, pursuant to BRAC 2005 action, Air Force Reserve A-10 flying operations at Naval Air Station Joint Reserve Base New Orleans terminated and the squadron moved to its present location at Nellis Air Force Base, Nevada.

At Nellis, the squadron initially was made up of Air Force Reserve Command personnel supporting fighter operations of the United States Air Force Warfare Center. They were fully integrated with the 57th Wing at Nellis and the 53d Wing at Eglin Air Force Base, Florida and perform operational test and evaluation and tactics development for the General Dynamics F-16 Fighting Falcon, McDonnell Douglas F-15 Eagle, McDonnell Douglas F-15E Strike Eagle Lockheed Martin F-22 Raptor Lockheed Martin F-35 Lightning II, and Fairchild Republic A-10 Thunderbolt II aircraft. (Note: Although the squadron's personnel operated these aircraft, they were assigned to regular units at Nellis and the squadron had no planes of its own.)

As part of a broader demand for "red air" adversaries to support training and test and evaluation activities, in May 2023, the squadron mission changed, and it became the 706th Aggressor Squadron. The 706th Aggressor Squadron began to equip with the F-16C Block 30 in September 2023. The 706th Aggressor Squadron will complement 57th Fighter Wing's 64th Aggressor Squadron in simulating fourth generation threat aircraft. The 65th Aggressor Squadrons will focus on simulating fifth generation threat aircraft with the Lockheed-Martin F-35A Lightning II.

== Lineage ==
- Constituted 706th Bombardment Squadron (Heavy) on 20 March 1943

Activated on 1 April 1943
Redesignated 706th Bombardment Squadron, Heavy on 20 August 1943
Inactivated on 28 August 1945

- Redesignated 706th Bombardment Squadron, Very Heavy on 26 September 1947

Activated in the Reserve on 26 March 1948
Inactivated on 27 June 1949

- Redesignated 706th Troop Carrier Squadron, Medium on 9 September 1955

Activated in the Reserve on 8 October 1955
Inactivated on 16 November 1957

- Activated in the reserve on 7 February 1959

Redesignated 706th Tactical Airlift Squadron on 1 July 1967
Redesignated 706th Tactical Fighter Squadron on 1 April 1978
Redesignated 706th Fighter Squadron on 1 February 1992
Redesignated 706th Aggressor Squadron on 14 May 2023

=== Assignments ===
- 446th Bombardment Group: 1 April 1943 – 28 August 1945
- 446th Bombardment Group: 26 March 1948 – 27 June 1949
- 446th Troop Carrier Group: 8 October 1955 – 16 November 1957
- 446th Troop Carrier Group: 7 February 1959
- 446th Troop Carrier Wing, 14 April 1959
- 926th Troop Carrier Group (later 926th Tactical Airlift Group, 926th Tactical Fighter Group, 926th Fighter Group): 17 January 1963
- 926th Operations Group: 1 August 1992
- 926th Group: 17 August 2007
- 926th Operations Group, 5 December 2014 – present

=== Stations ===
- Davis-Monthan Field, Arizona, 1 April 1943
- Lowry Field, Colorado, 8 June 1943 – c. 24 October 1943
- RAF Flixton (AAF-125), England, 4 November 1943 – 5 July 1945
- Sioux Falls Army Air Field, South Dakota, 15 July 1945 – 28 August 1945.
- Biggs Air Force Base, Texas, 26 March 1948 – 27 June 1949.
- Donaldson Air Force Base, South Carolina, 8 October 1955 – 16 November 1957
- Barksdale Air Force Base, Louisiana, 7 February 1959
- Naval Air Station New Orleans (later Naval Air Station Joint Reserve Base New Orleans, New Orleans Air Reserve Station), Louisiana, 8 May 1961
- Nellis Air Force Base, Nevada, 26 October 2007 – present

=== Aircraft ===
* Consolidated B-24 Liberator, 1943–1945
- Beechcraft C-45 Expeditor, 1955–1957
- Curtiss C-46 Commando, 1956–1957
- Fairchild C-119 Flying Boxcar, 1959–1970
- Lockheed C-130 Hercules, 1969–1978
* Cessna A-37B Dragonfly, 1978–1982
- Fairchild Republic A-10A Thunderbolt II, 1982–1992
- General Dynamics F-16 Fighting Falcon, 1992–1997
- Fairchild Republic A-10A Thunderbolt II, 1997–2007
- Lockheed Martin F-16C Fighting Falcon, 2023–present

=== Awards and campaigns ===
| Award streamer | Award | Dates | Notes |
|---|---|---|---|
| | Air Force Outstanding Unit Award with Combat "V" Device | 2 April 2002 – 31 July 2002 | 706th Fighter Squadron |
| | Air Force Outstanding Unit Award | 26 January 1968 – 10 January 1972 | 706th Tactical Airlift Squadron |
| | Air Force Outstanding Unit Award | 1 April 1968 – 20 January 1980 | 706th Tactical Fighter Squadron |
| | Air Force Outstanding Unit Award | 1 April 1988 – 31 March 1990 | 706th Tactical Fighter Squadron |
| | Air Force Outstanding Unit Award | 27 August 2007 – 26 August 2009 | 706th Fighter Squadron |
| | Republic of Vietnam Gallantry Cross with Palm | 14 February 1968 – 6 November 1972 | 706th Tactical Airlift Squadron |

| Campaign Streamer | Campaign | Dates | Notes |
|---|---|---|---|
| | Air Offensive, Europe | 4 November 1943 – 5 June 1944 | 706th Bombardment Squadron |
| | Normandy | 6 June 1944 – 24 July 1944 | 706th Bombardment Squadron |
| | Northern France | 25 July 1944 – 14 September 1944 | 706th Bombardment Squadron |
| | Rhineland | 15 September 1944 – 21 March 1945 | 706th Bombardment Squadron |
| | Central Europe | 22 March 1944 – 21 May 1945 | 706th Bombardment Squadron |
| | Ardennes-Alsace | 16 December 1944 – 25 January 1945 | 706th Bombardment Squadron |
| | Defense of Saudi Arabia | 2 August 1990 – 16 January 1991 | 706th Fighter Squadron |
| | Liberation and Defense of Kuwait | 17 January 1991 – 11 April 1991 | 706th Fighter Squadron |
| | Southwest Asia Ceasefire | 12 April 1991 – 30 November 1995 | 706th Fighter Squadron |
