= Herbert K. Pililaau =

United States Army Medal of Honor recipient

Herbert Kailieha Pililaʻau
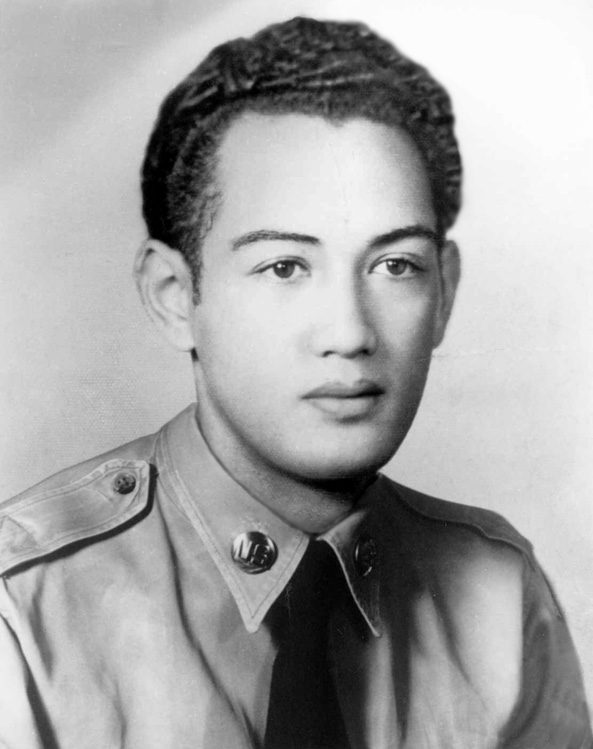
- Medal of Honor recipient Herbert Pililaʻau
- Born: October 10, 1928; Waiʻanae, Hawaiʻi
- Died: September 17, 1951 (aged 22); Heartbreak Ridge, Yanggu County, Gangwon Province, Korea
- Burial place: National Memorial Cemetery of the Pacific
- Military career
- Allegiance: United States of America
- Branch: United States Army
- Service years: to 1951
- Rank: Private First Class
- Units: Company C, 23rd Infantry Regiment, 2nd Infantry Division
- Conflicts: Korean War • Battle of Bloody Ridge • Battle of Heartbreak Ridge †
- Awards: Medal of Honor; Purple Heart

Herbert Kailieha Pililaʻau (October 10, 1928 – September 17, 1951) was a United States Army soldier and a recipient of the United States military's highest decoration, the Medal of Honor, for his actions in the Korean War. A Native Hawaiian who was born and raised on the island of Oʻahu, he was drafted into the military as a young man. Sent to Korea in early 1951, Pililaau participated as an automatic rifleman in the Battle of Bloody Ridge. During the subsequent Battle of Heartbreak Ridge, he voluntarily stayed behind to cover his unit's withdrawal in the face of an intense attack by North Korean forces. Alone, Pililaau held off the assault using his automatic rifle and hand grenades and, after exhausting all available ammunition, engaged the attackers in hand to hand combat until being overrun and killed. For these actions, Pililaau was posthumously awarded the Medal of Honor.

== Early life ==
Pililaʻau was born and raised in Waiʻanae to William Kaluhi Pililaʻau and Abigail Keolalani Kailieha, in a working-class suburb of the Leeward coast of Oahu in what was then the Territory of Hawaii. He was the ninth of 14 children, nine brothers and five sisters. Pililaʻau's parents were both Native Hawaiians and his mother, Abigail, spoke English and Hawaiian. She was the daughter of Luka (Kailieha) Norton. Pililaʻau was a talented singer and ukulele player as well as an avid reader. After graduating from Waipahu High School in 1948, Pililaʻau studied administration, secretarial work, and accounting at Cannon Business School.

== Military service ==
Drafted into the Army, Pililaʻau attended basic training at Fort Shafter. He briefly considered declaring himself a conscientious objector, as his Christian faith made him unsure of killing others but decided against this idea. Pililaʻau was sent to Korea in March 1951 and served as a private first class with Company C, 23rd Infantry Regiment, 2nd Infantry Division. Volunteering to be his squad's automatic rifleman, Pililaʻau carried a Browning Automatic Rifle (BAR). In August, Pililaʻau participated in the Battle of Bloody Ridge, in which the 2nd Infantry Division attacked and captured a ridge in east central Korea. Their next objective was a hill mass just to the north, near Pia-ri, which would come to be known as Heartbreak Ridge.

On September 17, 1951, Company C and two other companies were tasked with capturing Hill 931, one of Heartbreak Ridge's two identifiable peaks, from North Korean forces. When Company C's attack stalled on a ridgeline which ran south from the main peak, Pililaʻau's platoon set up a defensive perimeter ahead of the rest of the company. With the help of artillery, mortar, and heavy machine gun support, the platoon easily held off a series of probing assaults which began in the mid-afternoon. At about 10:00 p.m., two battalions of the 13th Infantry Regiment, 6th Division, Korean People's Army, began a concerted attack on the position. With North Korean artillery striking close by and ammunition running low, the platoon caught in cross fire in the rice paddies received permission to withdraw and rejoin the main body of the company as quickly as possible. Pililaʻau's squad was assigned to stay back momentarily and cover the retreat. Eventually, only Pililaʻau and his squad leader remained at the platoon's original position. The squad leader and forward observer Lt. Richard Hagar called in artillery fire continuously ahead of Pililaʻau, trying to cover him while he moved also calling fire on the two hill tops, while Pililaʻau continued to fight off the attack. At one point, Hagar became afraid that the artillery was too close and that he hit Pililaʻau. Hagar called out for him, and Pililaʻau said he was okay and told Hagar to keep going. After exhausting the ammunition for his BAR, Pililaʻau began throwing hand grenades until those too were gone. As some of his comrades watched from their new position further down the ridge, Pililaʻau threw rocks at the attackers before charging at them, wielding his trench knife with one hand and punching with the other. He was soon surrounded and killed by bayonet. At this point, Hagar fell back to rejoin his troops. When his platoon retook the position the next day, they found 40 dead North Korean soldiers around his body.

== Legacy and honors ==
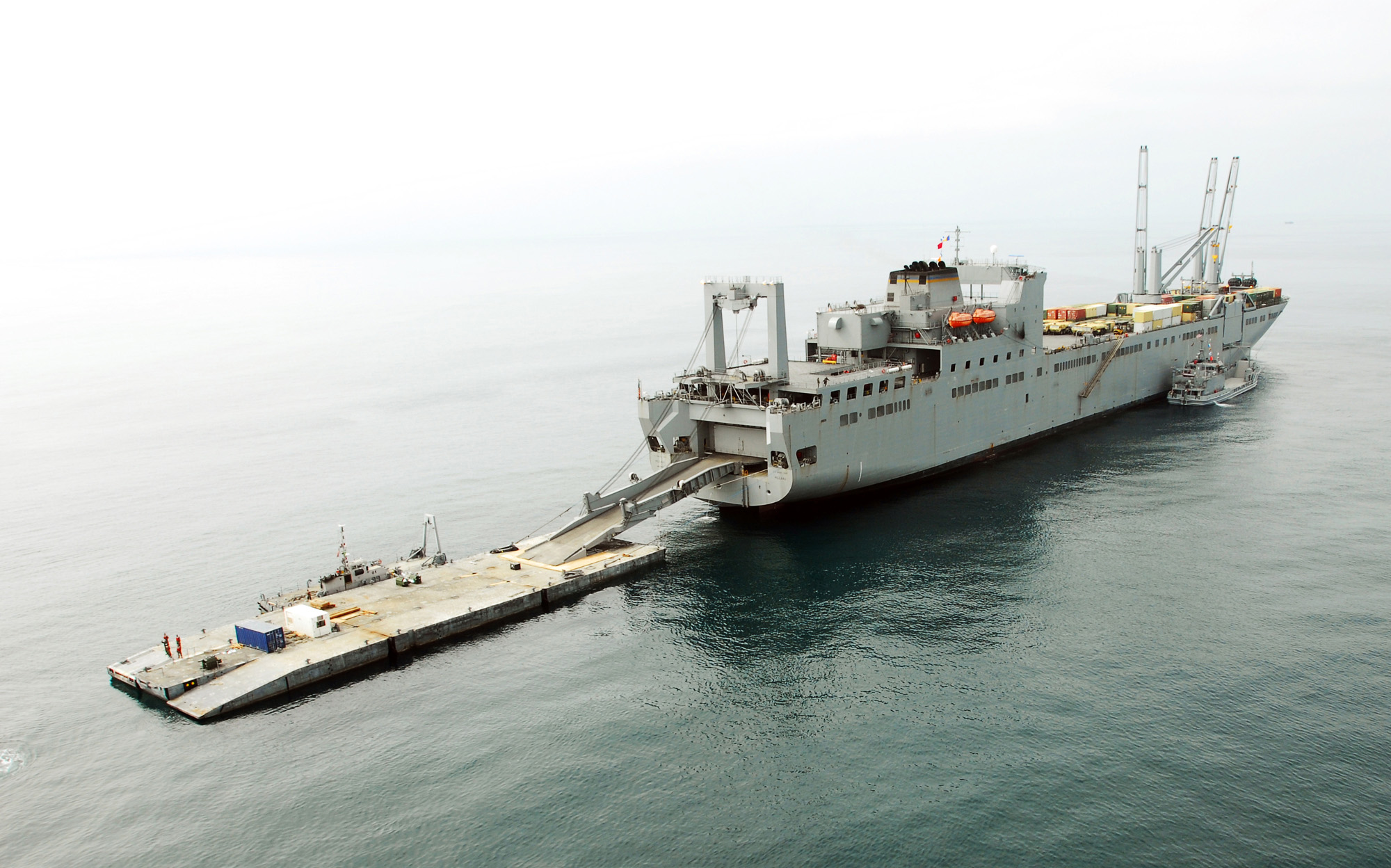
The USNS Pililaau anchored off the coast of Camp Pendleton, California, in 2008

Aged 22 at his death, Pililaʻau was buried at the National Memorial Cemetery of the Pacific in Honolulu on February 26, 1952. For his actions on Heartbreak Ridge, he was posthumously awarded the Medal of Honor later that year, on June 18. He was the first Hawaiian to receive the Medal of Honor.

In January 2000 in New Orleans, the United States Navy christened a Military Sealift Command cargo ship, the USNS Pililaau (T-AKR-304), in Pililaʻau's honor. Thirty-one members of his extended family were given a tour of the ship on December 10, 2003, when it made its first docking in Hawaii. Also named for Pililaʻau are a live-fire range at Makua Military Reservation, a park in his hometown of Wai'anae, and the Pililaau Army Recreation Center.

== Medal of Honor citation ==
Pililaʻau's official Medal of Honor citation reads:

Pfc. Pililaau, a member of Company C, distinguished himself by conspicuous gallantry and outstanding courage above and beyond the call of duty in action against the enemy. The enemy sent wave after wave of fanatical troops against his platoon which held a key terrain feature on "Heartbreak Ridge." Valiantly defending its position, the unit repulsed each attack until ammunition became practically exhausted and it was ordered to withdraw to a new position. Voluntarily remaining behind to cover the withdrawal, Pfc. Pililaau fired his automatic weapon into the ranks of the assailants, threw all his grenades and, with ammunition exhausted, closed with the foe in hand-to-hand combat, courageously fighting with his trench knife and bare fists until finally overcome and mortally wounded. When the position was subsequently retaken, more than 40 enemy dead were counted in the area he had so valiantly defended. His heroic devotion to duty, indomitable fighting spirit, and gallant self-sacrifice reflect the highest credit upon himself, the infantry, and the U.S. Army.

== See also ==
- List of Korean War Medal of Honor recipients
