= Pililaau Army Recreation Center =

Coordinates: 21.4464°N 158.1898°W

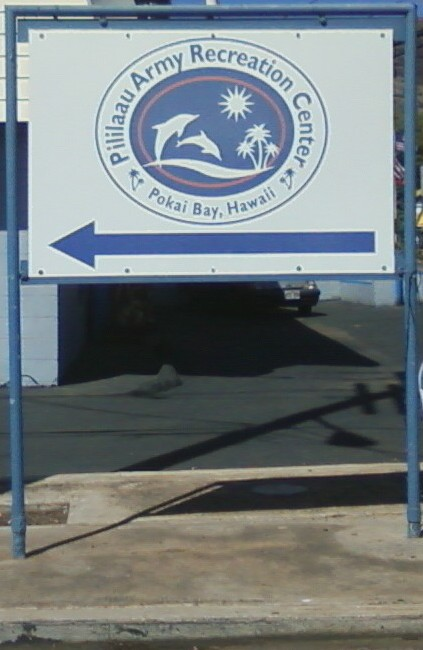
Directional sign pointing to the front gate of Pililaau Army Recreation Center.

Pililaau Army Recreation Center is part of the Armed Forces Recreation Centers system of the United States Department of Defense located on the island of Oahu. It is named for Herbert K. Pililaau, a United States Army soldier and a recipient of the Medal of Honor, the United States military's highest decoration, for his actions in the Korean War.

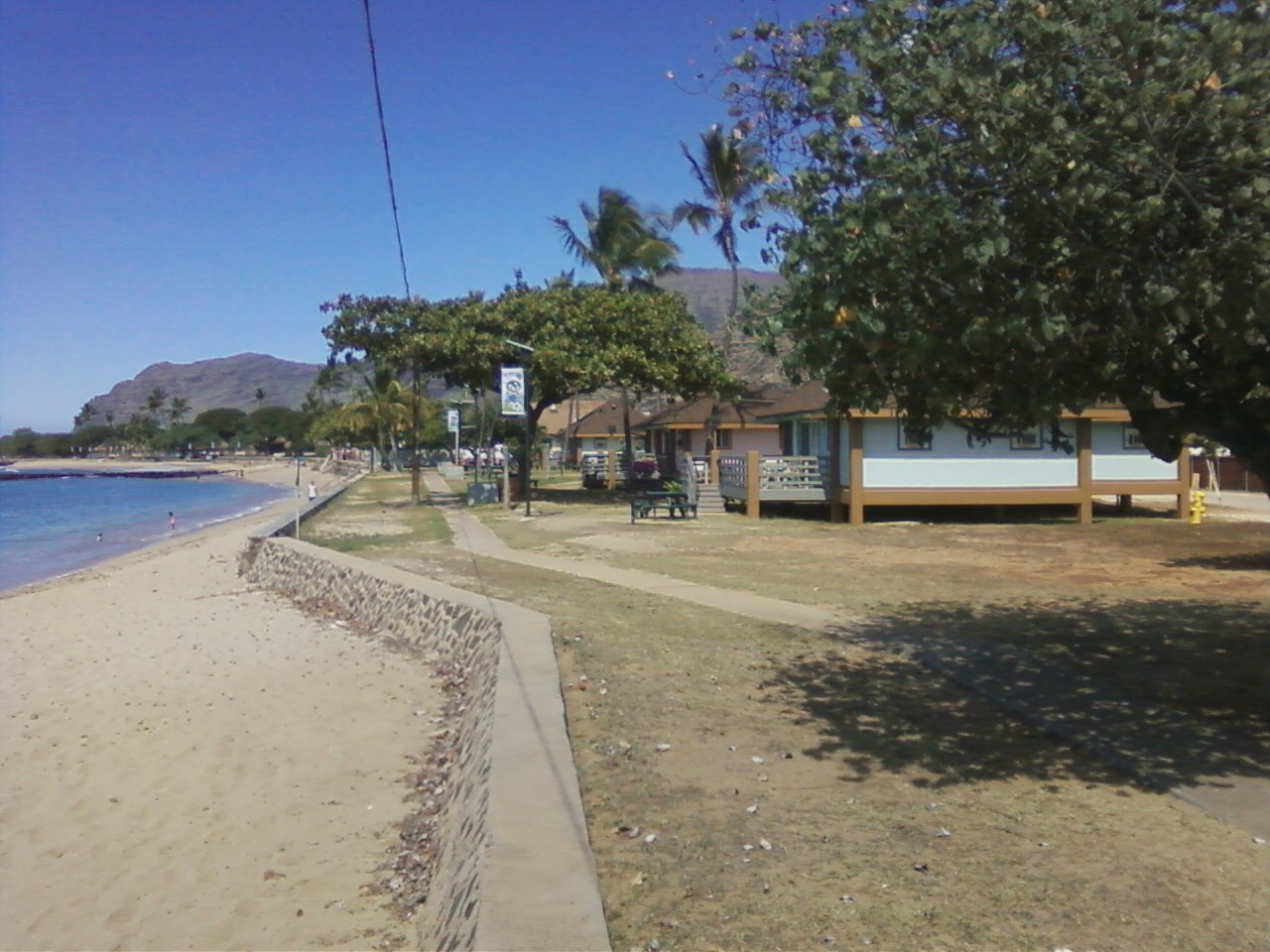
Looking at the beach and cabins at the Pililaau ARC.

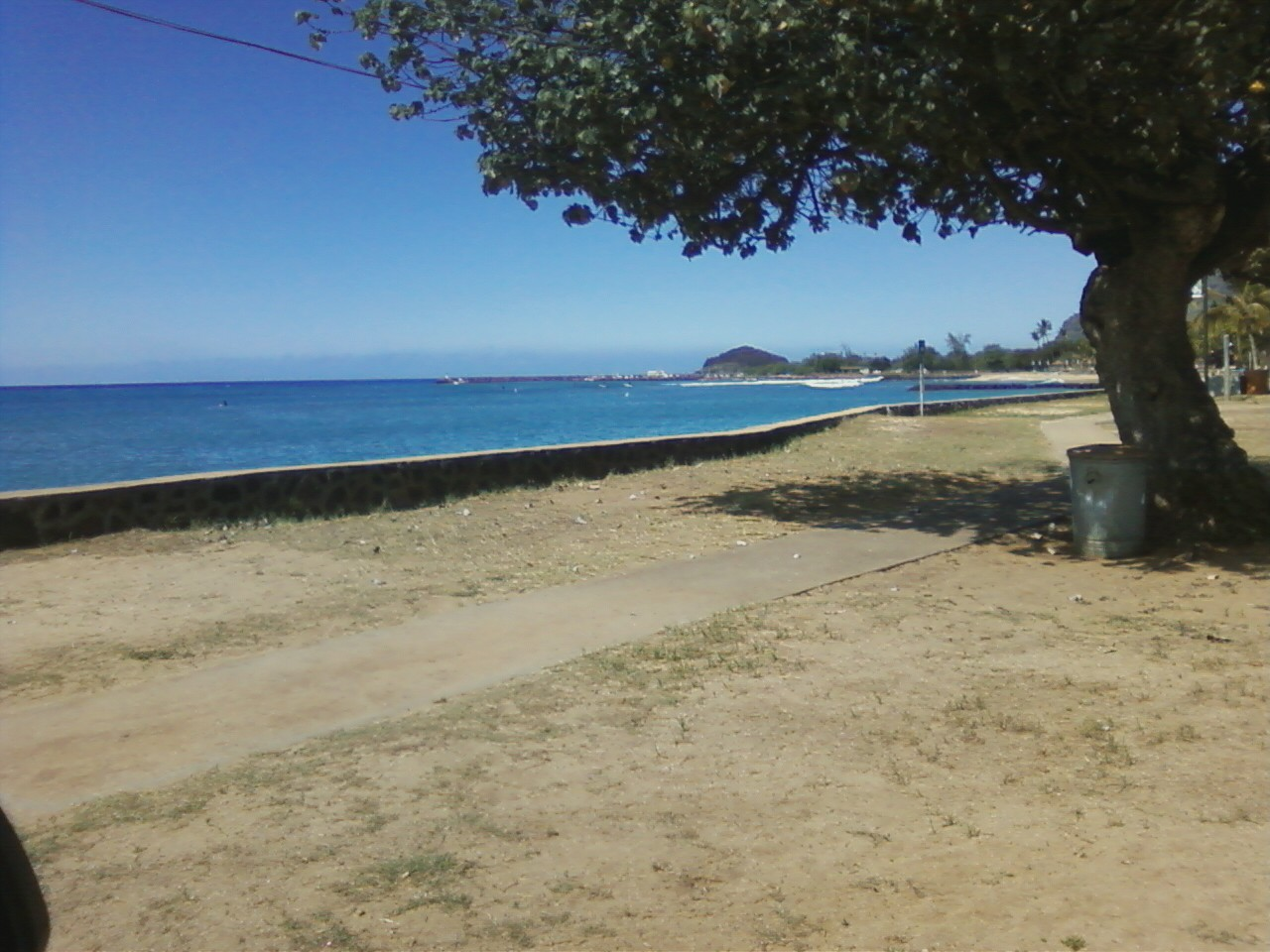
Looking west past the seawall at the Pililaau ARC.

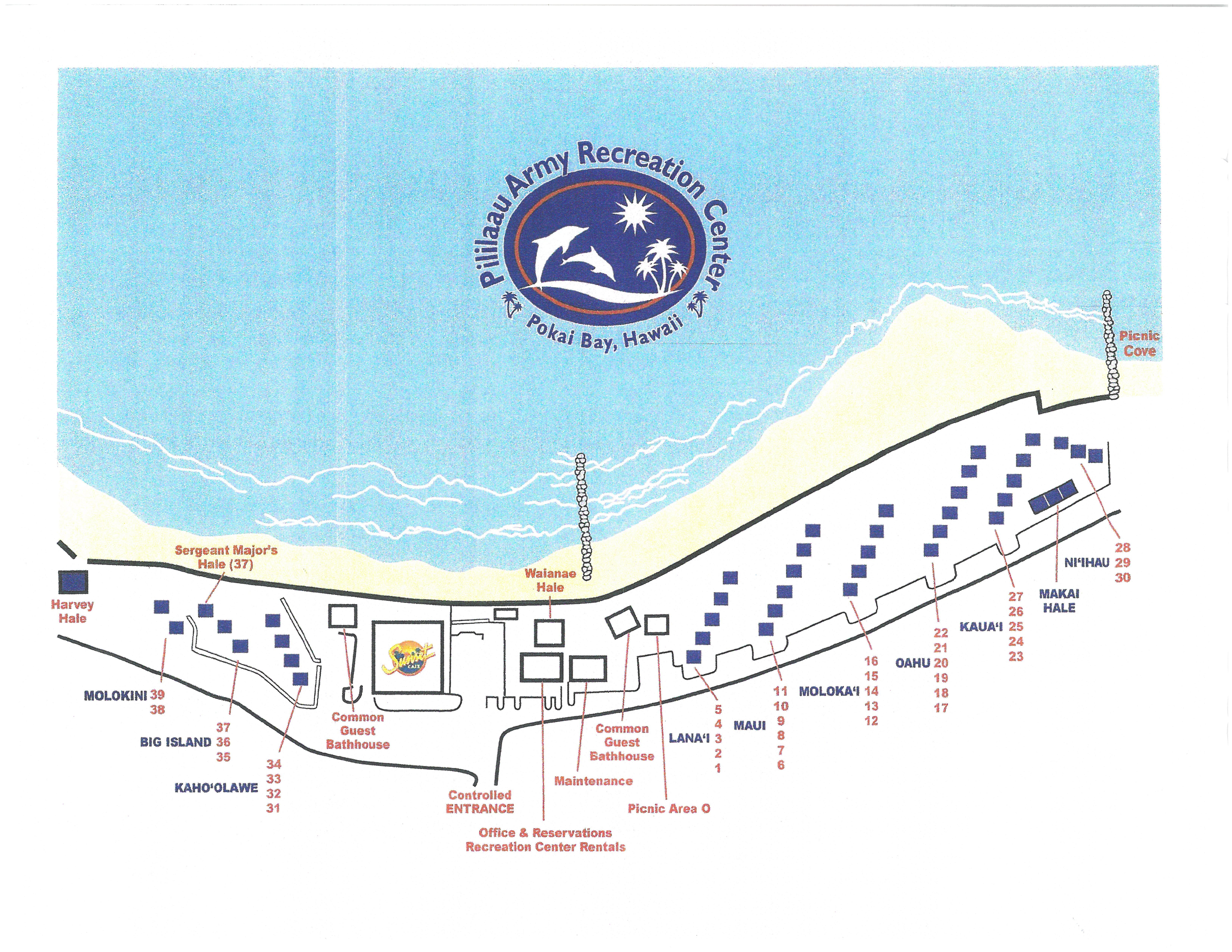
