= 82nd Troop Carrier Squadron =

82d Troop Carrier Squadron
- Active: 1943-1951
- Country: United States
- Branch: United States Air Force

The 82d Troop Carrier Squadron is an inactive United States Air Force unit. Its last assignment was with the 436th Troop Carrier Group, operated from Standiford Municipal Airport, Kentucky. It was inactivated on 16 April 1951.

== History ==
Formed in April 1943 by I Troop Carrier Command, trained and equipped at various bases in the United States for the balance of the year. Deployed to England, being assigned to IX Troop Carrier Command, Ninth Air Force in early January 1944, during the Allied buildup prior to the invasion of France.

The squadron participated in the D-Day operation, dropping 101st Airborne Division paratroops near Cherbourg Naval Base, then carried out re-supply and glider delivery missions the following day.

The squadron's aircraft flew supplies into Normandy as soon as suitable landing strips were available and evacuated casualties to England. On 17 July the air echelon flew to Grosseto airbase in Italy to prepare for operations connected with the invasion of southern France returning to England on 24 August.

Squadron moved to France in July 1944 and for the balance of the Northern France Campaign and the Western Allied invasion of Germany was engaged in combat resupply of ground forces, operating from Advanced Landing Grounds in northern France. Delivered supplies to rough Resupply and Evacuation airfields near the front lines, returning combat casualties to field hospitals in rear areas. Dropped airborne forces during Operation Market-Garden in September 1944 into the Netherlands; later participated in the airborne invasion of Germany in March 1945. After V-E Day, the squadron evacuated prisoners of war.

Returned to the United States in August 1945, became a transport squadron for Continental Air Command until inactivation in November 1945 when it was inactivated.

Postwar the squadron was activated in the air force reserve in 1947, first at Lockbourne AFB, Ohio, then Godman AFB, finally at Standiford Field, Louisville, Kentucky, operating C-46 Commandos for Tactical Air Command Eighteenth Air Force; activated during the Korean War in 1951, its aircraft and personnel being used as fillers for active duty units, then inactivated.

=== Operations and decorations ===
- Combat Operations. Airborne assaults on Normandy, Southern France, Holland, and Germany, relief of Bastogne, transportation of cargo and passengers in ETO and MTO during World War II.
- Campaigns. Rome-Arno, Normandy; Northern France; Southern France; Rhineland, Ardennes-Alsace; Central Europe
- Decorations. Distinguished Unit Citation: France, [6-7] Jun 1944.

=== Lineage ===
- Constituted 82d Troop Carrier Squadron on 23 Mar 1943

Activated on 1 Apr 1943
Inactivated on 15 Nov 1945

- Activated in the reserve on 16 Jul 1947

Re-designated 82d Troop Carrier Squadron (Medium) on 27 Jun 1949
Ordered to active service on 1 Apr 1951
Inactivated on 16 Apr 1951

=== Assignments ===
- 436th Troop Carrier Group, 1 Apr 1943 – 15 Nov 1945
- 436th Troop Carrier Group, 10 August 1947 – 16 April 1951

=== Stations ===
- Baer Field, Indiana, 1 Apr 1943
- Alliance Army Air Field, Nebraska, 2 May 1943
- Laurinburg-Maxton Army Air Base, North Carolina, 4 Aug 1943
- Baer Field, Indiana, 16-28 Dec 1943
- RAF Bottesford (AAF-481), England, Jan 1944
- RAF Membury (AAF-466), England, 3 Mar 1944-Feb 1945

Operated from Voltone Airfield, Italy, 20 Jul-23 Aug 1944

- Mourmelon-le-Grand Airfield (A-80), France, Feb-Jul 1945
- Baer Field, Indiana, 13 Aug 1945
- Malden Army Airfield, Missouri, 8 Sep-15 Nov 1945
- Lockbourne AFB, Ohio, 10 August 1947
- Evansville Municipal Airport, Indiana, 16 Jul 1947
- Godman AFB, Kentucky, 27 Jun 1949
- Standiford Municipal Airport, Kentucky, 10 Oct 1950 – 16 Apr 1951

=== Aircraft ===
- C-47 Skytrain, 1943–1946; 1949
- Airspeed Horsa (Glider), 1944–1945
- Waco CG-4 (Glider), 1944–1945
- C-46 Commando, 1945–1946; 1949–1951
