= 80th Troop Carrier Squadron =

- Active: 1943-1951
- Country: United States
- Branch: United States Air Force

The 80th Troop Carrier Squadron is an inactive United States Air Force unit. Formed in April 1943, its last assignment was with the 436th Troop Carrier Group, based at Standiford Municipal Airport, Kentucky. It was inactivated on 16 April 1951.

== History ==
The squadron was formed in April 1943 by I Troop Carrier Command, trained and equipped at various bases in the United States for the balance of the year. It was deployed to England, being assigned to IX Troop Carrier Command, Ninth Air Force, 53rd Troop Carrier Wing, 436th Troop Carrier Group, in early January 1944, during the Allied buildup prior to the invasion of France. Initially it was stationed at RAF Bottesford, then moved to RAF Membury 3 March 1944.

The squadron participated in the D-Day operation, dropping 101st Airborne Division paratroops near Sainte-Mère-Église on the Cotentin Peninsula in pre-dawn hours and towing gliders with 82nd Airborne Division paratroops at dusk to drop zones just inland from Utah Beach, then carried out re-supply drops and glider delivery missions the following day. The squadron's aircraft flew supplies into Normandy as soon as suitable landing strips were available and evacuated casualties to England.

From 20 July until 23 August, a detachment from the squadron operated from Voltone Airfield in Italy in support of Operation Dragoon, the invasion of Southern France, releasing gliders carrying 82nd Airborne Division paratroops in the assault area on 15 August. It flew several resupply missions to France and then dropped supplies to Allied forces in Italy. The detachment then returned to Membury airbase in England.

In late September the squadron carried out airborne operations over the Netherlands, dropping paratroops of the 101st Airborne Division and releasing gliders with reinforcements of troops and equipment in missions during Operation Market Garden. In late December, the squadron flew sorties during Operation Repulse, the resupply of Bastogne during the Battle of the Bulge.

The squadron moved to Villaroche (Melun) Airfield, France, in February 1945, and for the balance of the Northern France Campaign and the Western Allied invasion of Germany was engaged in combat resupply of ground forces, operating from Advanced Landing Grounds in northern France. Delivered supplies to rough Resupply and Evacuation airfields near the front lines, returning combat casualties to field hospitals in rear areas. Participated in Operation Varsity, the airborne invasion of Germany, in March 1945. After V-E Day, the squadron continued to evacuate patients and prisoners of war and flew practice missions with French paratroops.

Redeployed to the United States in August 1945, it became a transport squadron for Continental Air Command until inactivated in November 1945.

Postwar the squadron was activated in the Air Force Reserve in 1947, first at Godman AFB, then at Standiford Field, Louisville, Kentucky, operating C-46 Commandos for Tactical Air Command Eighteenth Air Force; activated during the Korean War in 1951, its aircraft and personnel being used as fillers for active duty units, then inactivated.

=== Operations and decorations ===
- Combat Operations. Airborne assaults on Normandy, Southern France, the Netherlands, and Germany; relief of Bastogne; transportation of cargo and passengers in ETO and MTO during World War II.
- Campaigns. Rome-Arno, Normandy; Northern France, Southern France; Rhineland; Ardennes-Alsace; Central Europe.
- Decorations. Distinguished Unit Citation: France, [6-7] Jun 1944.

=== Lineage ===
- Constituted 80th Troop Carrier Squadron on 23 Mar 1943

Activated on 1 Apr 1943
Inactivated on 15 Nov 1945

- Activated in the reserve on 16 Jul 1947

Re-designated 80th Troop Carrier Squadron (Medium) on 27 Jun 1949
Ordered to active service on 1 Apr 1951
Inactivated on 16 Apr 1951

=== Assignments ===
- 436th Troop Carrier Group, 1 Apr 1943 – 15 Nov 1945
- 436th Troop Carrier Group, 16 Jul 1947
- 434th Troop Carrier Group, 1 Jul 1948
- 436th Troop Carrier Group, 27 Jun 1949 – 16 Apr 1951

=== Stations ===
- Baer Field, Indiana, 1 Apr 1943
- Alliance Army Air Field, Nebraska, 2 May 1943
- Laurinburg-Maxton Army Air Base, North Carolina, 4 Aug 1943
- Baer Field, Indiana, 16-28 Dec 1943
- RAF Bottesford (AAF-481), England, Jan 1944
- RAF Membury (AAF-466), England, 3 Mar 1944-Feb 1945

Operated from Voltone Airfield, Italy, 20 Jul-23 Aug 1944

- Villaroche (Melun) Airfield, France, Feb-Jul 1945
- Baer Field, Indiana, 13 Aug 1945
- Malden Army Airfield, Missouri, 8 Sep-15 Nov 1945
- Evansville Municipal Airport, Indiana, 16 Jul 1947
- Godman AFB, Kentucky, 27 Jun 1949
- Standiford Municipal Airport, Kentucky, 10 Oct 1950 – 16 Apr 1951

=== Aircraft ===
- C-47 Skytrain, 1943–1946; 1949
- Airspeed Horsa (Glider), 1944–1945
- Waco CG-4 (Glider), 1944–1945
- C-46 Commando, 1945–1946; 1949–1951
