= 436th Operations Group =

Active United States Air Force unit

- Country: United States
- Branch: United States Air Force
- Motto(s): Parati, Volentes, Potentes!

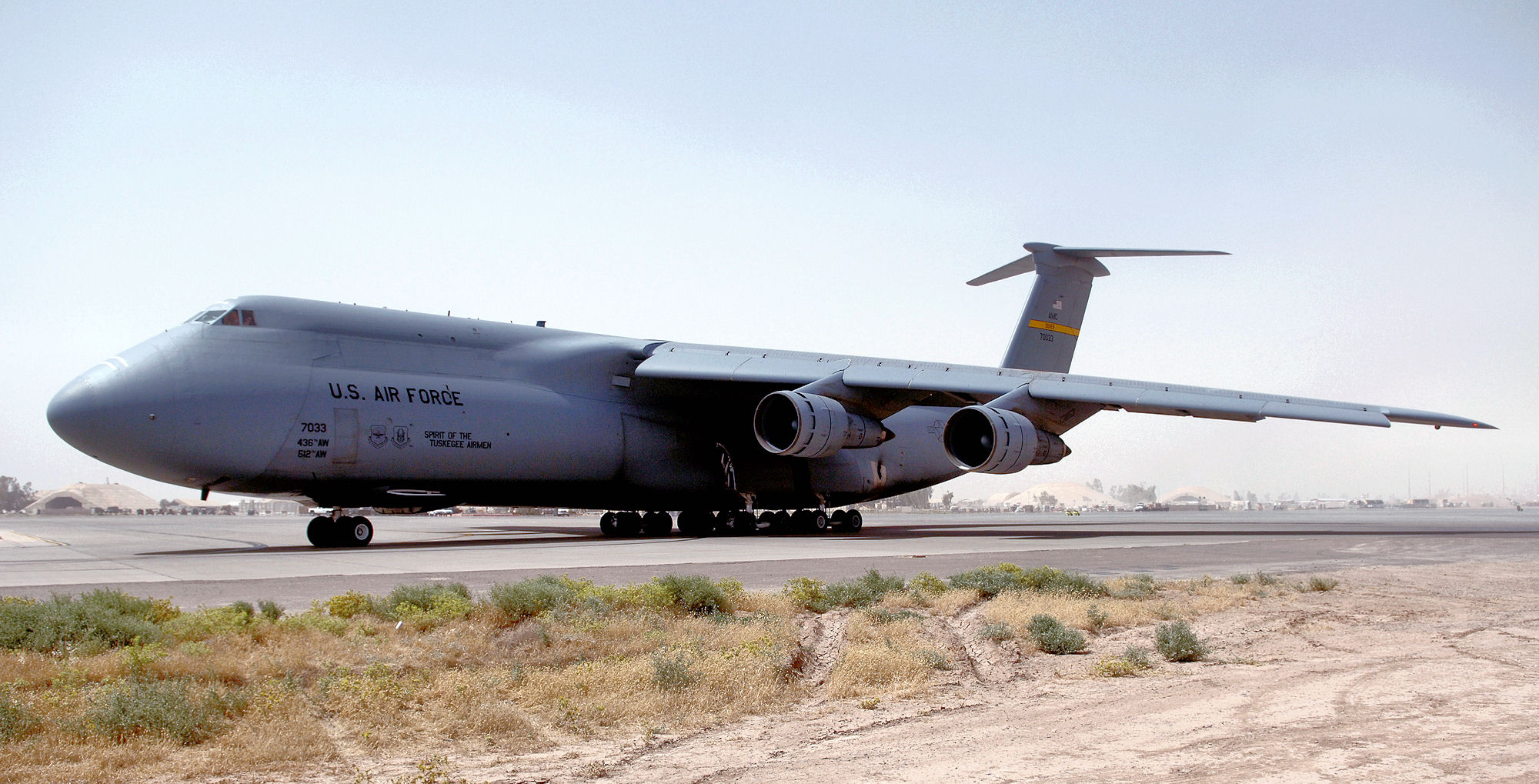
436th Operations Group Lockheed C-5B Galaxy, 87-033 "Spirit of the Tuskegee Airmen", waits for clearance to taxi out on the parking ramp at Balad Air Base, Iraq. This aircraft has since been reassigned to the 439th OG at Westover Air Reserve Base, Massachusetts, the first C-5B to be assigned to the Air Force Reserve.

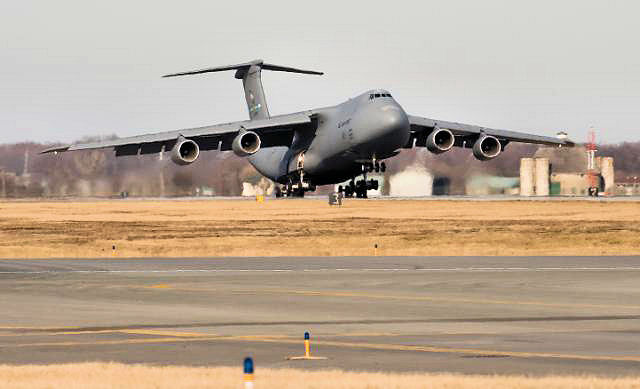
Dover's first Lockheed C-5M Super Galaxy, (Modified C-5B 86-0025), "Spirit of Global Reach", arriving on 9 February 2009

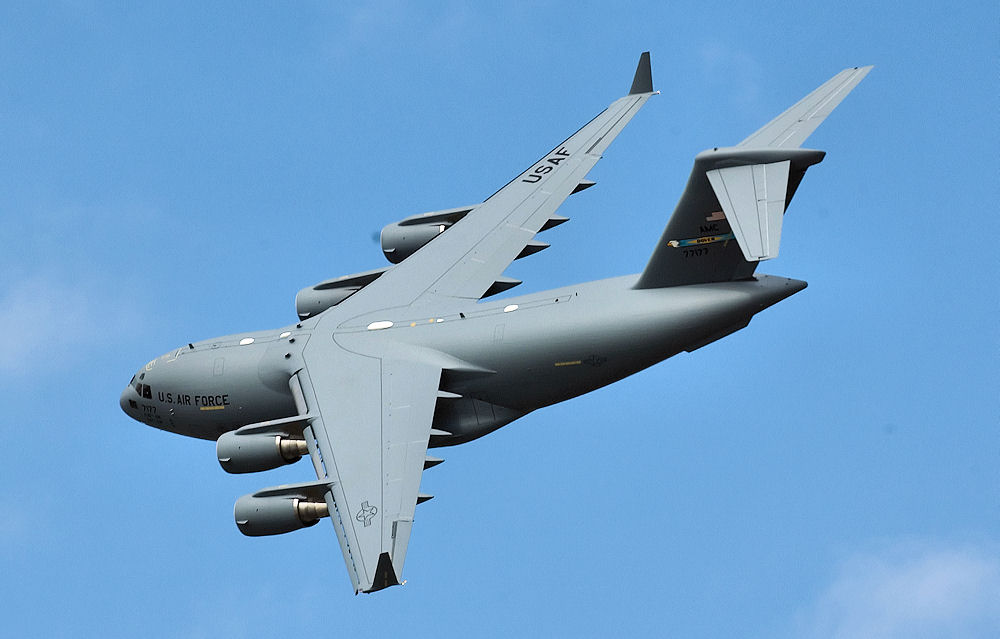
Dover's newest Boeing C-17A Globemaster III 07-7177 banks during a flyover before it landed on 9 September 2008.

The 436th Operations Group is an active United States Air Force unit. It is the flying component of the Eighteenth Air Force 436th Airlift Wing, stationed at Dover Air Force Base, Delaware.

The unit's World War II predecessor unit, the 436th Troop Carrier Group was a C-47 Skytrain transport unit assigned to Ninth Air Force in Western Europe. The group earned the Distinguished Unit Citation for its first missions 6–7 June, the Normandy Invasion. On subsequent missions the 436th dropped troops and supplies and inserted gliders into Southern France and the Netherlands. In March 1945, the unit was a part of the Allied push across the Rhine and into Germany's heartland. Following the war, the 436th evacuated patients and prisoners of war until it was inactivated in November 1945.

== Overview ==
The 436OG consists of two flying squadrons, the 3d and 9th Airlift Squadrons, and the 436th Operations Support Squadron. It trains on its 18 assigned Lockheed C-5 Galaxy aircraft, known as "the free world's largest airlifter," and two Boeing C-17 Globemaster III aircraft.

== History ==
For additional history and lineage, see 436th Airlift Wing

=== World War II ===
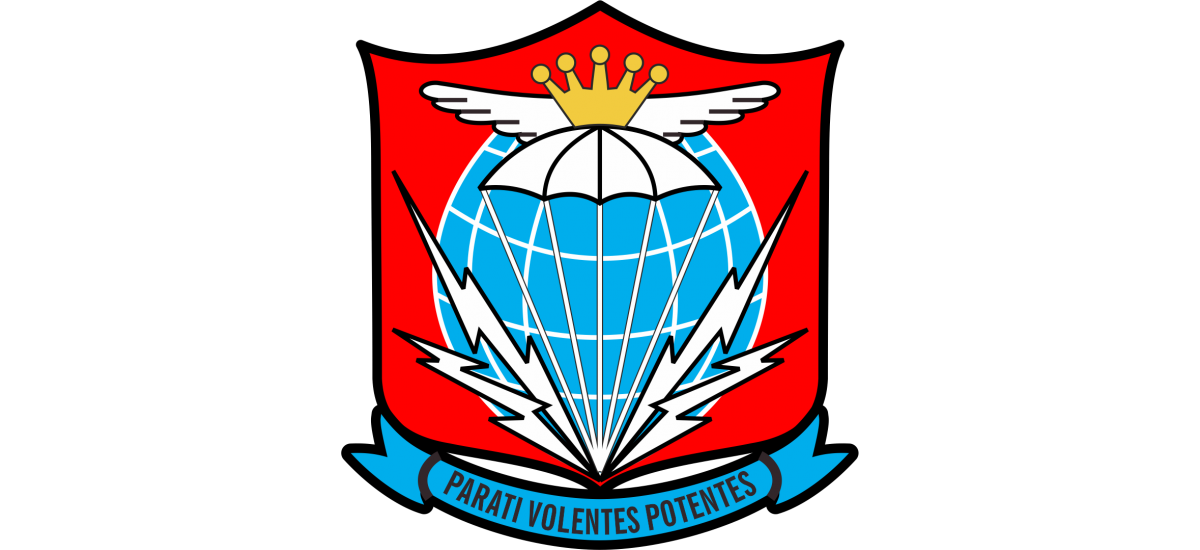
Emblem of the 436th Troop Carrier Group

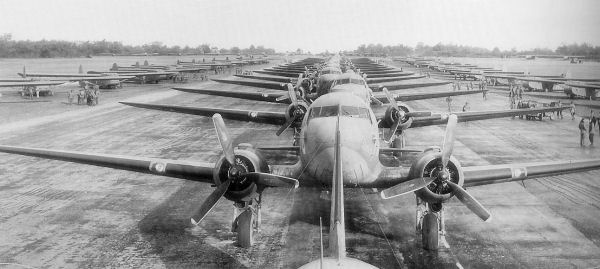
436th Troop Carrier Group Douglas C-47s and CG-4A Waco Gliders lined up on the runway at Membury Airfield, September 1944, prior to deployment to the Netherlands during Operation Market-Garden

The 436th trained for duty in Europe with the Ninth Air Force during 1943. It continued training in England from January–May 1944. The group began combat operations in June 1944 and participated in five major airborne operations by May 1945.

The 436th received a Distinguished Unit Citation for its Operation Neptune missions, which were flown during the Normandy invasion; dropping paratroops of 101st Airborne Division inland from the Utah beachhead early on 6 June; releasing 82nd Airborne Division gliders with reinforcement troops and supplies in the evening of D-Day; and carrying out re-supply drops and glider delivery the following day. The group's aircraft flew supplies into Normandy as soon as suitable landing strips were available, evacuating casualties to England on their return flights. They also picked up undamaged gliders on the coast.

In July 1944, the group deployed 49 aircraft and crews to Italy to take part in the invasion of southern France, Operation Dragoon, releasing gliders carrying the First Airborne Task Force paratroops in the assault area on 15 August. It flew several resupply missions to France and then dropped supplies to Allied forces in Italy.

The deployed element returned to England late in August, and in September the group carried out airborne operations over the Netherlands, dropping paratroops of 101st Airborne Division and releasing gliders with reinforcements of troops and equipment during Operation Market Garden.

At the end of December 1944, the group flew missions during Operation Repulse, the re-supply of Bastogne during the Battle of the Bulge.

It towed gliders to Wesel on 24 March 1945 to provide troops for the airborne assault across the Rhine, Operation Varsity. Further, it carried gasoline to the front lines and evacuated patients, 30–31 March. The 436th also flew transport missions almost daily when not engaged in airborne operations, hauling such things as gasoline, ammunition, medical supplies, rations, clothing, and evacuated the wounded to hospitals in England and France.

After V-E Day, the group continued to evacuate patients and prisoners of war, and flew practice missions with French paratroops before being redeployed to the U.S. and inactivated.

=== Cold War ===
Trained primarily with C-47s in the Reserves June 1949 – April 1951, ordered to active service during Korean War and inactivated almost immediately, personnel serving as fillers for other USAF units. Trained again in the Reserves, 1955–1958, being inactivated when parent unit adopted Air Force Tri-Deputate organization.

=== Modern era ===
Activated in 1991 when 436 AW implemented the Objective Organization Plan, assigning all operational flying squadrons to Operations Group. Began flying worldwide airlift, including mail and other high priority cargo, aero-medical evacuation, personnel transport, and humanitarian and diplomatic missions.

Served as the only combat-ready C-5 unit capable of airdrop and special operations procedures in support of tactical forces and national objectives. Provided special mortuary airlift missions from Iraq and Afghanistan 2001 to present. Provided strategic global airlift capability for the worldwide support of contingency and emergency war plans required to support Department of Defense objectives. This was expertly demonstrated by its support in airlifting troops, equipment and supplies in response to the 11 September 2001 terrorist attacks.

The 436 OG functions as the "big horses" in the logistics chain for the war on terrorism and is currently playing a major role in aerial resupply for Operations Enduring Freedom and Iraqi Freedom.

=== Lineage ===
- Established as 436 Troop Carrier Group on 23 March 1943

Activated on 1 April 1943
Inactivated on 15 November 1945

- Activated in the Reserve on 15 March 1947

Redesignated 436 Troop Carrier Group, Medium, on 27 June 1949
Inactivated on 16 April 1951

- Activated on 18 May 1955

Inactivated on 15 May 1958
Redesignated: 436 Military Airlift Group on 31 July 1985 (Remained inactive)

- Redesignated: 436 Operations Group and activated on 1 December 1991

=== Assignments ===
- 50th Troop Carrier Wing, 1 April 1943
- 53 Troop Carrier Wing, 15 April 1943
- 61 Troop Carrier Wing, 19 July 1943
- 50th Troop Carrier Wing, 2 August 1943
- 60 Troop Carrier Wing, 13 August 1943
- 50th Troop Carrier Wing, January 1944
- 53 Troop Carrier Wing, 3 March 1944
- Continental Air Forces, August-15 November 1945
- Eleventh Air Force, 15 March 1947
- 323 Troop Carrier Wing (later, 323 Air Division, Troop Carrier), 17 October 1947
- 69th Air Division, Troop Carrier, 1 July 1948
- 436th Troop Carrier Wing, 27 June 1949 – 16 April 1951; 18 May 1955 – 15 May 1958
- 436th Airlift Wing, 1 December 1991–present

=== Components ===
- 3d Airlift Squadron: 1 December 1991–present (C-17 Globemaster)
- 9th Airlift Squadron: 1 December 1991–present (C-5 Galaxy)
- 31st Airlift Squadron: 1 December 1991 – 14 January 1994
- 436th Operations Support Squadron: 1 December 1991 – present
- 73d Troop Carrier Squadron: 1 July 1948 – 27 June 1949; 27 June 1949 – 1 July 1949
- 79th Troop Carrier Squadron (S6): 1 April 1943 – 15 November 1945; 27 June 1949 – 16 April 1951; 18 May 1955 – 15 May 1958
- 80th Troop Carrier Squadron (7D): 1 April 1943 – 15 November 1945; 1 August 1947 – 1 July 1948; 27 June 1949 – 16 April 1951
- 81st Troop Carrier Squadron (U5): 1 April 1943 – 15 November 1945; 26 May 1947 – 1 July 1948; 27 June 1949 – 16 April 1951; 22 August 1955-16 November 1957
- 82d Troop Carrier Squadron (3D): 1 April 1943 – 15 November 1945; 10 August 1947 – 27 June 1949; 27 June 1949 – 16 April 1951
- 316th Troop Carrier Squadron: 15 March 1947 – 27 June 1949.

=== Stations ===
- Baer Field, Indiana, 1 April 1943
- Alliance Army Air Field, Nebraska, 2 May 1943
- Laurinburg-Maxton Army Air Base, North Carolina, 5 August 1943
- Baer Field, Indiana, 16–28 December 1943
- RAF Bottesford (AAF-481), England, 30 January 1944
- RAF Membury (AAF-466), England, 3 March 1944 – 18 February 1945
- Villaroche (Melun) Airfield (A-55), France, 21 February – 15 July 1945
- Baer Field, Indiana, 15 August 1945
- Malden Army Airfield, Missouri, 8 September – 15 November 1945
- Godman Field (later, Godman AFB), Kentucky, 15 March 1947
- Standiford Muni Aprt (later, Standiford Field), Kentucky, 20 October 1950 – 16 April 1951
- New York NAS (later, USNAS, New York), 18 May 1955 – 15 May 1958
- Dover AFB, Delaware, 1 December 1991–present

=== Aircraft ===
- C-47 Skytrain, 1943–1945; 1949–1951
- C-45 Expeditor, 1949; 1955–1957
- C-119 Flying Boxcar, 1957
- C-5 Galaxy, 1991–present
- C-17 Globemaster III, 2007–present
