= 323rd Division =

323rd Division may refer to:

- 323rd Infantry Division, Wehrmacht, Germany
- 323rd Rifle Division, Soviet Union
- 323rd Air Division, United States

== See also ==
- List of military divisions by number
