= RAF Membury =

Royal Air Force station in England, 1944–1946

RAF Membury USAAF Station AAF-466
- Near Lambourn, Berkshire in England
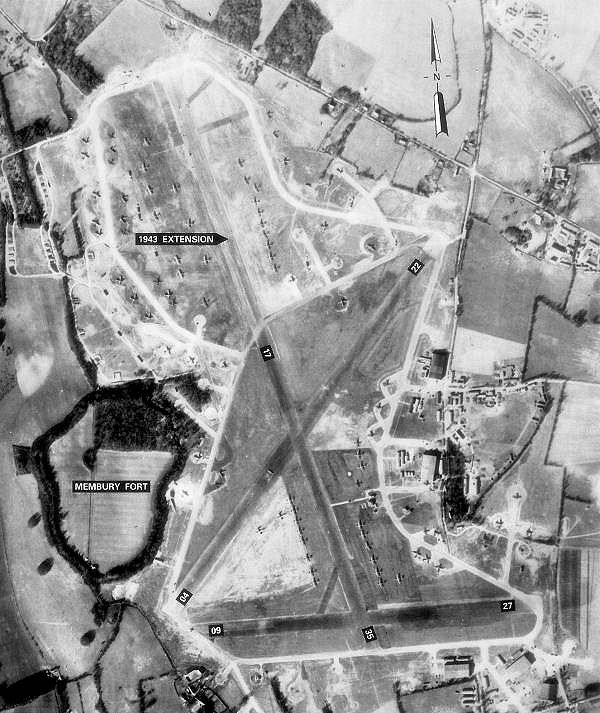
- Membury airfield photographed on 8 August 1944. As Membury had been designed as a maintenance and repair depot, additional hangar space and other facilities were required. However, because the 04/22 runway could not be lengthened due to the hilly terrain on the eastern side, the secondary 17/35 was increased in length. This is what gives the runway layout an unusual shape.

Site information
- Type: Royal Air Force station
- Code: ME
- Owner: Air Ministry
- Operator: Royal Air Force; United States Army Air Forces
- Controlled by: Eighth Air Force; Ninth Air Force; RAF Transport Command

Location
- Shown within Berkshire RAF Membury (the United Kingdom)
- Coordinates: 51°28′N 01°33′W

Site history
- Built: 1942
- Built by: Gee, Walker & Slater
- In use: 1942–1946
- Battles/wars: European Theatre of World War II; Air Offensive, Europe July 1942 – May 1945

Airfield information
Runways
| Direction | Length and surface |
|---|---|
| 17/35 | 6,000 feet (1,829 m) Concrete |
| 04/22 | 4,550 feet (1,387 m) Concrete |
| 09/27 | 3,300 feet (1,006 m) Concrete |

Royal Air Force Membury or more simply RAF Membury is a former Royal Air Force station built in the civil parish of Lambourn in Berkshire, England, approximately 3 miles (4.8 km) southwest of Lambourn. The airfield was opened on the site of a civil airfield in August 1942, and closed in October 1946.

The base was used by both the Royal Air Force (RAF) and United States Army Air Forces (USAAF). During the Second World War it was used by several combat units with varying missions.

The airfield continued in use, but in the late 1960s, the M4 motorway was built (opening in 1971) and it ran straight through the airfield, including through the middle of the main runway. The Membury services were built on the site, in a triangle between the former two largest runways. A smaller airfield continues to operate on the southern half of the site, and the former technical site is now the Membury Business Park industrial estate.

== History ==
=== Construction ===
Construction was authorised for the site in May 1941, and was originally intended to be a training airfield for 91 Group, a training group of RAF Bomber Command.

During construction, the East side of the earthworks of the Iron Age hillfort at Membury Camp were destroyed, including flanking diagonal outworks.

Construction was nearing completion in August 1942, and RAF technical staff arrived on site to install equipment, only to be withdrawn within days as the base was to be handed over the United States Army Air Force (USAAF).

=== USAAF use ===
On 21 August 1942, headquarters personnel from the Eighth Air Force arrived at Membury, and it was designated as USAAF Station AAF-466. Its USAAF Station Code was "ME".

==== 3rd Photographic and 67th Observation/Reconnaissance Groups ====
Meanwhile, the Eighth Air Force VIII Ground Air Support Command, the forebear of the reborn Ninth Air Force had designated Membury for use by its reconnaissance units. These were the men of the 3rd Photographic and the 67th Observation Groups, who arrived at Membury on 7 and 8 September 1942.

The 3rd consisted of the 5th, 12th, 13th, 14th, 15th and 23d squadrons, however the group's air echelons were still in the United States at Colorado Springs AAF, Colorado. Whilst at RAF Membury, the group was reassigned to the Twelfth Air Force and moved to RAF Steeple Morden in Cambridgeshire during October prior to its movement to North Africa.

The 67th Observation Group arrived at Membury from Esler AAF Louisiana, flying Supermarine Spitfire V aircraft, and consisted of the following operational squadrons:

- 12th Observation/Reconnaissance Squadron
- 107th Observation/Reconnaissance Squadron
- 109th Observation/Reconnaissance Squadron
- 153rd Observation/Reconnaissance Squadron

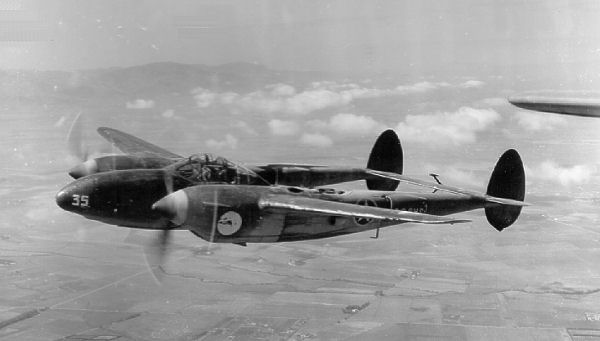
Lockheed P-38J (F-5C) Lightning of the 67th Recon Group.

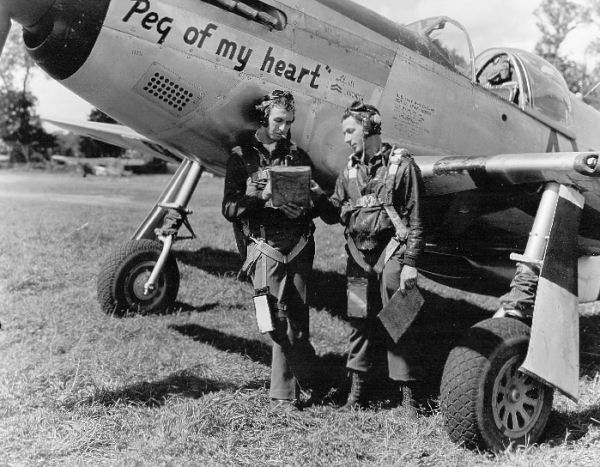
North American P-51A Mustang (F-6) "Peg of My Heart" of the 67th Recon Group.

At the time of the transfer to Ninth Air Force, the group was redesignated the 67th Reconnaissance Group.

At the time, the 107th and 109th Squadrons were converting to North American P-51A Mustangs. However, before this was completed, the 107th Squadron was moved to nearby RAF Aldermaston.

==== 6th Tactical Air Depot ====
During the winter of 1942/1943, the Air Depot site was occupied by the 7th and 16th Air Depot Groups, forming the 6th Tactical Air Depot which specialised in the repair and modification of Republic P-47 Thunderbolt.

In 1943, the north–south runway was extended to 6,000 feet (1,800 m) to support the facility as an Air Depot.

==== 366th Fighter Group ====
In January 1944 the 366th Fighter Group arrived at Membury from Bluethenthal AAF North Carolina. Operational squadrons of the group were:

- 389th Fighter Squadron (A6)
- 390th Fighter Squadron (B2)
- 391st Fighter Squadron (A8)

The 366th was a group of Ninth Air Force's 71st Fighter Wing, IX Tactical Air Command. Before the group could become operational, the unit was moved to RAF Thruxton on 1 March.

==== 436th Troop Carrier Group ====
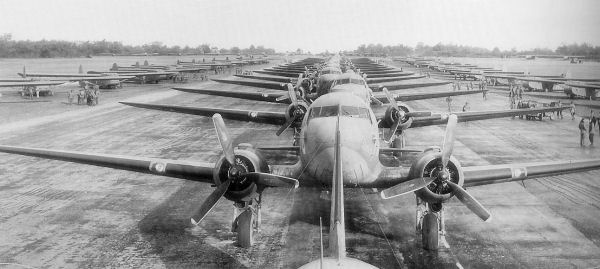
Douglas C-47s and CG-4A Waco Gliders lined up on the runway at Membury Airfield, 1944.

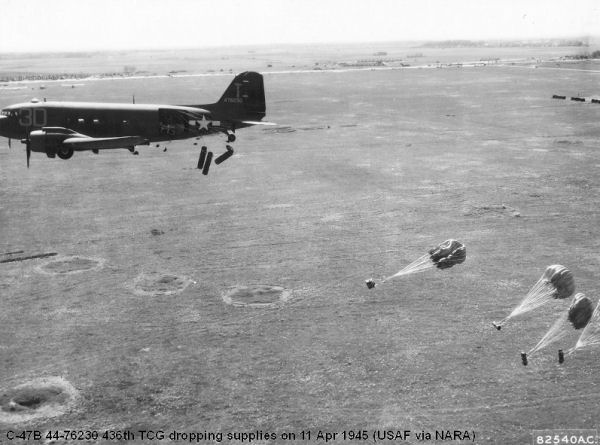
Douglas C-47B Skytrain dropping supplies.

The 436th Troop Carrier Group with its Douglas C-47/C-53 Skytrains arrived on 3 March from RAF Bottesford. Operational squadrons of the group were:

- 79th Troop Carrier Squadron (S6)
- 80th Troop Carrier Squadron (7D)
- 81st Troop Carrier Squadron (U5)
- 82nd Troop Carrier Squadron (3D)

The 436th Troop Carrier Wing, part of the 53rd Troop Carrier Wing, was assigned to Membury.

Membury became a hub of activity in the run up to D-Day, as the 436th worked with the 101st Airborne "Screaming Eagles" to train on glider landings for Mission Albany. Five C-47 aircraft from Membury were lost on D-Day.

When the 53rd Troop Carrier Wing moved its groups to France in February 1945 the 436th vacated Membury between the 21st and 25th for its new location at Melun (A-55). Nevertheless, there was still a US presence at Membury until a few weeks after the end of hostilities as the airfield was being used by the IX Troop Carrier Command as a pick-up point.

=== RAF Transport Command use and closure ===
With the 436th leaving Membury for Melun in France and the Americans departing by the end of June the station handed back to the RAF on 1 July 1945. On 15 July, C-47 Dakotas of 525 Squadron arrived on the base, and they were joined by 187 Squadron in October.

On 30 January 1946, a Royal Air Force C-47 Dakota based at Membury crashed when returning to the station in a storm near Le Mans, France, killing 11 RAF servicemen.

In October 1946, the station was closed and Membury was reduced to care and maintenance status, parented by RAF Welford.

In the 1950s, the base was considered as having potential as a Strategic Air Command airfield, but was rejected over the alignment of the runways (with the largest runway being north–south aligned), and RAF Greenham Common, around 12.5 miles (20.1 km) away, was chosen instead.

The following units were also here at some point:

- No. 3 Maintenance Unit RAF
- No. 121 Airfield Headquarters RAF
- No. 5 Section, No. 1552 (Radio Aids Training) Flight RAF
- Station Flight, Membury

== In popular culture ==
Much of the 1951 novel Air Bridge by Hammond Innes is set in the closed RAF Membury at the time of the Berlin Airlift, and describes how the decaying airfield and its surroundings looked at that time.

The airfield was used by the BBC as a filming location for Doctor Who, representing a UNIT airfield twice in the shows history, the first time was in the opening episode of the 1971 serial The Daemons and again in the second episode of 1974's Planet of the Spiders.

== Current use ==
Many small industries took over the old buildings on the former Air Depot technical site which are used for light industrial purposes. The former aircraft hangars are used for grain storage. The former airfield tower stood until 1998 when it was demolished.

Membury is now jointly owned and operated by two aircraft operating companies, as well as hosting paramotor and microlight training.

In recent years the remaining runways have had new tarmac strips laid and new aircraft hangars were erected in 2010.

== See also ==
- List of former Royal Air Force stations
- 82nd Airborne Division
