= 316th Troop Carrier Squadron =

- Active: 1943-1949
- Country: United States
- Branch: United States Air Force

The 316th Troop Carrier Squadron is an inactive unit of the United States Air Force. Its last assignment was with the 436th Troop Carrier Group, stationed at Godman Field, Kentucky. It was inactivated on 27 June 1949.

== Overview ==
The unit was active during World War II and the immediate postwar years. Its mission was aerial transportation in the Hawaiian Islands and to forward bases in the Pacific. It later was active in the Air Force Reserve.

== History ==
=== Lineage ===
- Constituted 316th Troop Carrier Squadron on 7 December 1943

Activated on 15 December 1943
Inactivated on 25 March 1946

- Activated in the reserve on 15 March 1947

Inactivated on 27 June 1949.

=== Assignments ===
- I Troop Carrier Command, 15 December 1943

Attached to: 61st Troop Carrier Wing, 15 December 1943
Attached to: 1st Provisional Troop Carrier Group, February-30 September 1944

- VI Air Service Area Command, 4 November 1944
- Seventh Air Force, 22 July 1945
- Eighth Air Force, 1 September 1945
- 54th Troop Carrier Wing, 15 February-25 March 1946
- 436th Troop Carrier Group, 15 March 1947 – 27 June 1949.

=== Stations ===
- Sedalia Army Air Field, Missouri, 15 December 1943
- Alliance Army Air Field, Nebraska 25 January 1944
- Camp Mackall, North Carolina, to March-30 September 1944
- Kahuku AAB, Hawaii (Territory), 4 November 1944
- Bellows Field, Hawaii (Territory), 16 February 1945
- Kadena Airfield, Okinawa, 22 August 1945 – 25 March 1946
- Godman Field, Kentucky, 15 March 1947 – 27 June 1949.

=== Aircraft ===
- C-47 Skytrain, 1944–1945
- C-46 Commando, 1945-1946.
