= 60th Fighter Wing =

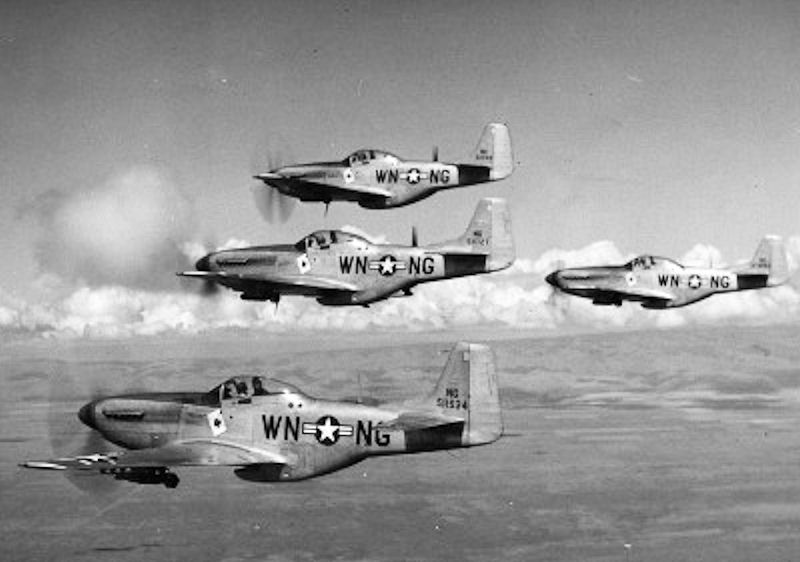
- 116th Fighter Squadron F-51 Mustangs, 1948
- Active: 1943-1945; 1946-1950
- Country: United States
- Branch: United States Air Force
- Type: Wing
- Role: Troop carrier training; fighter
- Engagements: World War II

The 60th Fighter Wing was a National Guard fighter wing of the United States Air Force, stationed at Felts Field, Spokane, Washington from 1947 until 1950, when it was inactivated as the National Guard reorganized its operational units under the wing base organization system. It was withdrawn from the National Guard and inactivated on 31 October 1950. The wing was first active as the 60th Troop Carrier Wing during World War II, when it was used in the training of airlift units for combat. (Note: This wing is not related to the 60th Troop Carrier Wing that was activated in 1948.)

== History ==
=== World War II ===
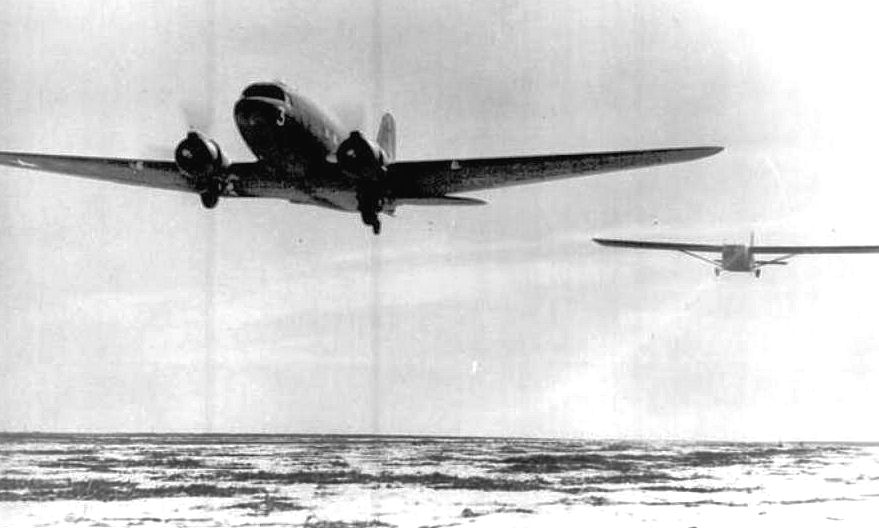
C-47 and CG-4 at a training base in the United States

The wing was first activated as the 60th Troop Carrier Wing at Sedalia Army Air Field, Missouri, where it was assigned to I Troop Carrier Command. The following month, it moved to Pope Field, North Carolina and began training airlift units before their deployment overseas. The wing trained not only troop carrier groups, but also glider units. It participated in combined training and exercises with airborne units. Following the end of the war the wing was inactivated.

=== National Guard ===
In 1946, the wing was alotted to the National Guard and redesignated 60th Fighter Wing. It was extended federal recognition and activated on 7 December 1947. At the end of October 1950, the Air National Guard converted to the wing base organization. As a result, the wing was withdrawn from the National Guard and inactivated on 31 October 1950. Most of the headquarters personnel of the wing formed the cadre of the new 142d Fighter Wing.

== Lineage ==
- Constituted as the 60th Troop Carrier Wing on 5 June 1943

Activated on 12 June 1943 (Note: On 15 April 1944, Headquarters Squadron, 60th Troop Carrier Wing was disbanded and I Troop Carrier Command organized the 801st AAF Base Unit (Headquarters, 60th Troop Carrier Wing) to replace it. No byline. "Abstract, History 60th Troop Carrier Wing, April 1944". Air Force History Index.)
Inactivated on 8 October 1945
Redesignated 60th Fighter Wing, and allotted to the National Guard on 24 May 1946 (Note: Maurer says the unit was allotted to the Air National Guard (ANG), but the ANG did not exist until after the Air Force became a separate service.)
Extended federal recognition and activated on 7 December 1947
Inactivated and returned to the control of the Department of the Air Force, on 31 October 1950

- Disbanded on 15 June 1983

== Assignments ==
- I Troop Carrier Command, 12 June 1943 – 8 October 1945
- Washington National Guard, 7 December 1947 – 31 October 1950

== Components ==
- 316th Troop Carrier Group: 10 June – 9 October 1945
- 436th Troop Carrier Group: 13 August 1943 – January 1944
- 440th Troop Carrier Group: c. 31 December 1943 – 25 March 1944
- 442d Troop Carrier Group; 26 January – c. 29 March 1944
- 142d Fighter Group: April 1948 – 31 October 1950 (Portland Municipal Airport, Oregon) (Note: Uness otherwise noted, subordinate units were located with wing headquarters.)
- 160th Aircraft Control and Warning Group: c. 29 April 1948 – 31 October 1950 (Geiger Field, Washington)
- 242d Air Service Group, 7 December 1947 – 31 October 1950
- 610th Signal Light Construction Company, Aviation: c. 9 September 1948 – 31 October 1950 (Boeing Field, Washington)

=== Stations ===
- Sedalia Army Air Field, Missouri, 12 June 1943
- Pope Field, North Carolina, 22 July 1943
- Laurinburg-Maxton Army Air Base, North Carolina, c. 20 December 1943
- Pope Field, North Carolina, C. 8 March 1944 – 8 October 1945.
- Felts Field, Washington, 7 December 1947 – 31 October 1950
