= RAF Bottesford =

Former RAF base in Leicestershire, England

RAF Bottesford USAAF Station AAF-481
- Near Bottesford, Leicestershire in England
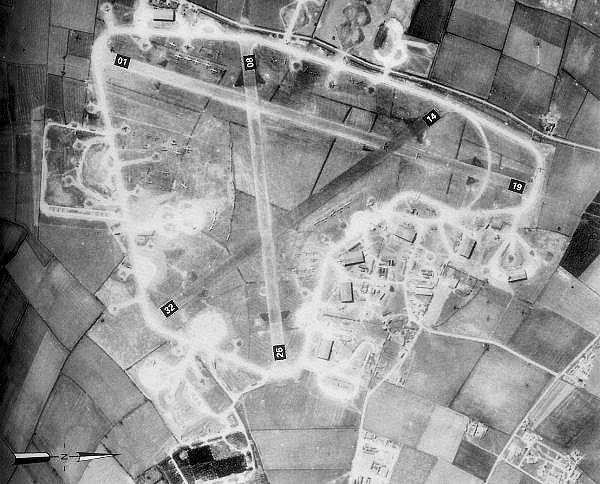
- RAF Bottesford, April 1944. Today, most of the airfield remains intact.

Site information
- Type: Royal Air Force station
- Code: AQ
- Owner: Air Ministry
- Operator: Royal Air Force; 1941-43 & 1944- United States Army Air Forces 1943-44
- Controlled by: RAF Bomber Command * No. 3 Group RAF * No. 5 Group RAF * No. 7 (HCU) Group RAF; Ninth Air Force

Location
- Shown within Leicestershire RAF Bottesford (the United Kingdom)
- Coordinates: 52°57′50″N 000°46′54″W

Site history
- Built: 1940/41
- Built by: George Wimpey & Co Ltd
- In use: September 1941 - 1948
- Battles/wars: European theatre of World War II

Airfield information
- Elevation: 110 feet (34 m) AMSL
Runways
Direction	Length and surface
08/26	1,740 metres (5,709 ft) Asphalt
00/00	1,280 metres (4,199 ft) Asphalt
00/00	1,370 metres (4,495 ft) Asphalt

Royal Air Force Bottesford or more simply RAF Bottesford is a former Royal Air Force station located on the Leicestershire-Lincolnshire county border, 7 miles (11 km) north west of Grantham, Lincolnshire and 7 miles (11 km) south of Newark-on-Trent, Nottinghamshire, England.

Opened in 1942, it was used by both the Royal Air Force (RAF) and United States Army Air Forces (USAAF). During the Second World War it was used primarily as a troop carrier airfield for paratroopers and as a bomber airfield before closing in 1948.

Today the remains of the airfield are located on private property with the technical site being used as an industrial estate. One of the runways is currently used by Cazoo for storing cars and the control tower used as an office.

== History ==
=== RAF Bomber Command use ===
The airfield was opened as a RAF Bomber Command station in No. 5 Group RAF area during the autumn of 1941, with No. 207 Squadron RAF moving in with its troublesome Avro Manchesters during November. However, because of continual difficulties experienced with their Rolls-Royce Vulture engines operations were frequently curtailed, but in March 1942 the squadron was able to step up its bombing raids on Germany when it became one of the first to receive the new Avro Lancaster in March 1942.

No. 207 Sqn left in September 1942 for RAF Langar and in November a new Australian manned squadron, No. 467 Squadron RAAF, arrived in November 1942 commencing operations on the night of 2/3 January 1943.

=== USAAF use ===
It was first occupied by the 50th Troop Carrier Wing Headquarters on 15 November. It was then opened as a reception base for Douglas C-47/C-53 Skytrain groups that were scheduled to fly in from the United States.

It was known as USAAF Station AAF-481 for security reasons by the USAAF during the war, and by which it was referred to instead of location. Its USAAF Station Code was "AQ".

==== 436th Troop Carrier Group ====
The first USAAF group to arrive at Bottesford was 436th Troop Carrier Group a few days into the New Year from Baer Army Airfield, Indiana. Operational squadrons of the group were:

- 79th Troop Carrier Squadron (S6)
- 80th Troop Carrier Squadron (7D)
- 81st Troop Carrier Squadron (U5)
- 82nd Troop Carrier Squadron (3D)

The 436th TCG was assigned to the 53rd Troop Carrier Wing. On 3 March the 436th Group was moved south to lake up station at RAF Membury

==== 440th Troop Carrier Group ====
Within a week (between 8/11 March), the C-47s of the 440th Troop Carrier Group started to arrive from Baer Army Airfield. Operational squadrons of the group were:

- 95th Troop Carrier Squadron (9X)
- 96th Troop Carrier Squadron (6Z)
- 97th Troop Carrier Squadron (W6)
- 98th Troop Carrier Squadron (8Y)

After using the airfield during the following two months for glider repair and modification, the USAAF then departed.

=== Subsequent RAF wartime use ===
The USAAF relinquished Bottesford to No. 5 Group Bomber Command in July 1944. After the end of the war, a small holding party remained for a few years until it was sold off in 1948.

The following units were also here at some point:

- No. 1 Bomber Defence Training Flight RAF as part of No. 1668 Heavy Conversion Unit RAF (June - September 1945)
- Detachment from No. 3 (Coastal) Operational Training Unit RAF (January 1941 - ?)
- No. 7 Group Communication Flight RAF (November 1944 - March 1945)
- No. 17 Service Flying Training School RAF (September 1946 - June 1947)
- No. 24 Blind Approach Training Flight RAF (October 1941) became No. 1524 (Beam Approach Training) Flight RAF (October 1941 - January 1944)
- No. 30 Heavy Glider Maintenance Section RAF
- No. 72 Base (October 1944 - April 1945)
- No. 90 Squadron RAF
- Sub site for No. 92 Maintenance Unit RAF (January 1959 - March 1960)
- Sub site for No. 93 Maintenance Unit RAF (January 1949 - January 1959)
- No. 207 Conversion Flight RAF (January - August 1942)
- Sub site for No. 256 Maintenance Unit RAF (May 1947 - December 1948)
- No. 1321 (Bomber Defence Training) Flight RAF (September - November 1944)
- No. 2770 Squadron RAF Regiment

== Current use ==
With the facility released from military control, farmers were using the land for crops. Today, the technical site buildings are operated as an industrial facility. Runways, all of which still exist with just a small amount of concrete (mostly dispersal loops) being removed for hardcore.

The perimeter track and two T-2 hangars still exist, being used for unknown purposes, although the condition of the perimeter track is very deteriorated. The former airfield control tower has been restored and used as offices.

== See also ==
- List of former Royal Air Force stations
