= 436th Operations Support Squadron =

436th OSS
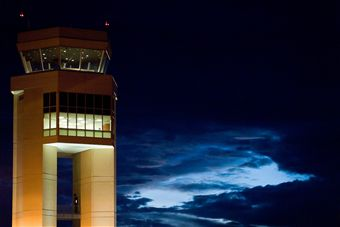
- Dover Air Force Base’s Control Tower undergoes tests during construction Nov. 10, 2008. The renovation helped modernize equipment and techniques air traffic controllers use at Dover AFB, Del. (U.S. Air Force photo by Roland Balik)
- Active: 1 December 1991-present
- Country: United States
- Branch: United States Air Force
- Type: support
- Part of: Air Mobility Command; 18th Air Force; 436th Airlift Wing; 436th Operations Group
- Garrison/HQ: Dover Air Force Base, Delaware
- Nickname(s): Fighting Eagles
- Decorations: AMC airfield flight of the year (2014)

Commanders
- Current commander: Lt Col Steven R. Hawkins

Insignia
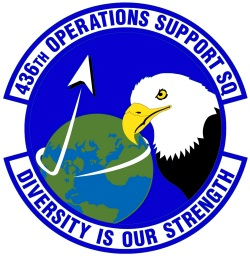
- 436th OSS emblem

The 436th Operation support squadron (436th OSS) is an active United States Air Force squadron. It is assigned to the Air Mobility Command Eighteenth Air Force, and is based at Dover Air Force Base, Delaware.

== Overview ==
The 436th OSS consists of mission planning and aircrew training, tactics, life support, intelligence, weather, airfield management, and air traffic control.

== 436th Operations Support Squadron Lineage and Honors ==
Lineage: Constituted and activated as 436th Operations Support Squadron on 1 December 1991.

Honors / Decorations:

- Air Force Outstanding Unit Award
  - 1 August 1992 – 31 July 1994
  - 1 July 1997 – 30 June 1999
  - 1 July 2000 – 30 June 2001
  - 1 July 2001 – 30 June 2002
  - 1 July 2002 – 30 June 2003
  - 1 July 2003 – 30 June 2004
  - 1 July 2004 – 30 June 2005
  - 1 September 2007 – 31 August 2009
  - 1 January 2010 – 31 December 2010
  - 1 January 2011 – 31 December 2011
- AMC OSS of the year 2019
- AMC Airfield Operations Flight of the Year
  - 2014
- AMC ATCALS Flight of the Year
  - 2015
  - 2016
  - 2017
  - 2018
- AMC SERE Program of the Year
  - 2021

Commanders:

- Lieutenant Colonel Daniel Schellinger 1 December 1991
- Lieutenant Colonel Douglas M. Marshall 20 September 1992
- Lieutenant Colonel Erwin F. Lessell II 19 April 1994
- Lieutenant Colonel John A. Guillory 7 July 1995
- Lieutenant Colonel John E. Ball 13 June 1997
- Major Milton C. Abbott 24 July 1998
- Lieutenant Colonel Gregory P. Cook 11 September 1998
- Lieutenant Colonel James D. Hamilton February 2003
- Lieutenant Colonel Mark E. De Luca, February 2005
- Lieutenant Colonel Michael J. Spangler 30 March 2006
- Lieutenant Colonel David J. Kumashiro 14 March 2008
- Lieutenant Colonel Dale L. Landis 12 February 2010
- Lieutenant Colonel Douglas D. Jackson 11 July 2011
- Lieutenant Colonel Derek M. Salmi 11 June 2013
- Lieutenant Colonel Aaron J. Oelrich 11 June 2015
- Lieutenant Colonel Kit R. Conn. 11 June 2017
- Lieutenant Colonel David T. Bredesen 23 May 2019
- Lieutenant Colonel Steven R. Hawkins 11 June 2021

Emblem: Approved on 11 December 2000.
Description: On a disc Azure, issuant from dexter base a terrestrial demi-globe Celeste displaying land masses Vert, issuant from sinister base a demi-eagle Sable, head feathers Argent, eyed and beaked Or detailed of the fourth, orbiting the globe clockwise and fesswise a contrail angled and extended chiefward and terminating in a flight symbol White debruising its own shadow Sable, all within a narrow border Blue. Significance: Blue and yellow are the Air Force colors. Blue alludes to the sky, the primary theater of Air Force operations. Yellow refers to the sun and the excellence required of Air Force personnel. The globe signifies the scope of the unit's responsibilities. The delta and contrail symbolize the unit's support of space operations. The eagle is a symbol of our country and reference to the parent wing “The Eagle Wing.” Motto: “Diversity is our Strength”

== History of the 436th Operations Support Squadron ==
The 436th Operations Support Squadron activated on 1 December 1991, in compliance with the U.S. Air Force Chief of Staff's reorganization plan. It is a professional team providing dependable air traffic control, airfield management, weather, intelligence, life support, tactics, mission planning and aircrew training services to the Eagle Wing and its worldwide customers. The squadron has over 150 people assigned to complete its mission. The airfield operations flight consists of air traffic control and airfield management branches. The flight provides support for all aircraft and aircrews stationed on and transiting DAFB. The air traffic control branch consists of the tower and radar approach control while the airfield management branch is responsible for the airfield and base operations. The life support flight provides aircrew with emergency oxygen masks, flotation equipment, emergency signaling equipment, protective helmets, and aircrew chemical ensembles. The flight conducts training on life support equipment, chemical defense and combat survival. The current operations flight provides current intelligence information in support of the wing's global airlift mission. The intelligence flight provides current intelligence information in support of the wing's global airlift mission. The weather flight provides 24-hour weather support to DAFB and surrounding communities. Services consist of forecasting, observing and severe weather warning notification, in protection of over $5.8 billion of vital assets. In addition, the flight provides weather briefing services to all aircrews operating out of DAFB and to U.S. Army and Air Force National Guard units across the northeastern U.S. The weapons and tactics flight enhances the flying squadrons’ readiness for combat missions by developing and training combat environment tactics and through combat mission planning support, tactical deception planning and quality assurance. The training flight is responsible for the overall management of the Wing's aircrew flight and ground training program. They ensure operational capabilities are met through development and implementation of standardized training programs. The training flight schedules, coordinates, and monitors equipment utilization and the contractor's compliance with the multimillion-dollar aircrew training system contract.”

=== Assignments ===
- 436th Operations Group, 1 Dec 1991–Present

=== Stations ===
- Dover AFB, Delaware, 1 December 1991–Present
