= 50th Troop Carrier Wing =

50th Troop Carrier Wing 50th Air Division
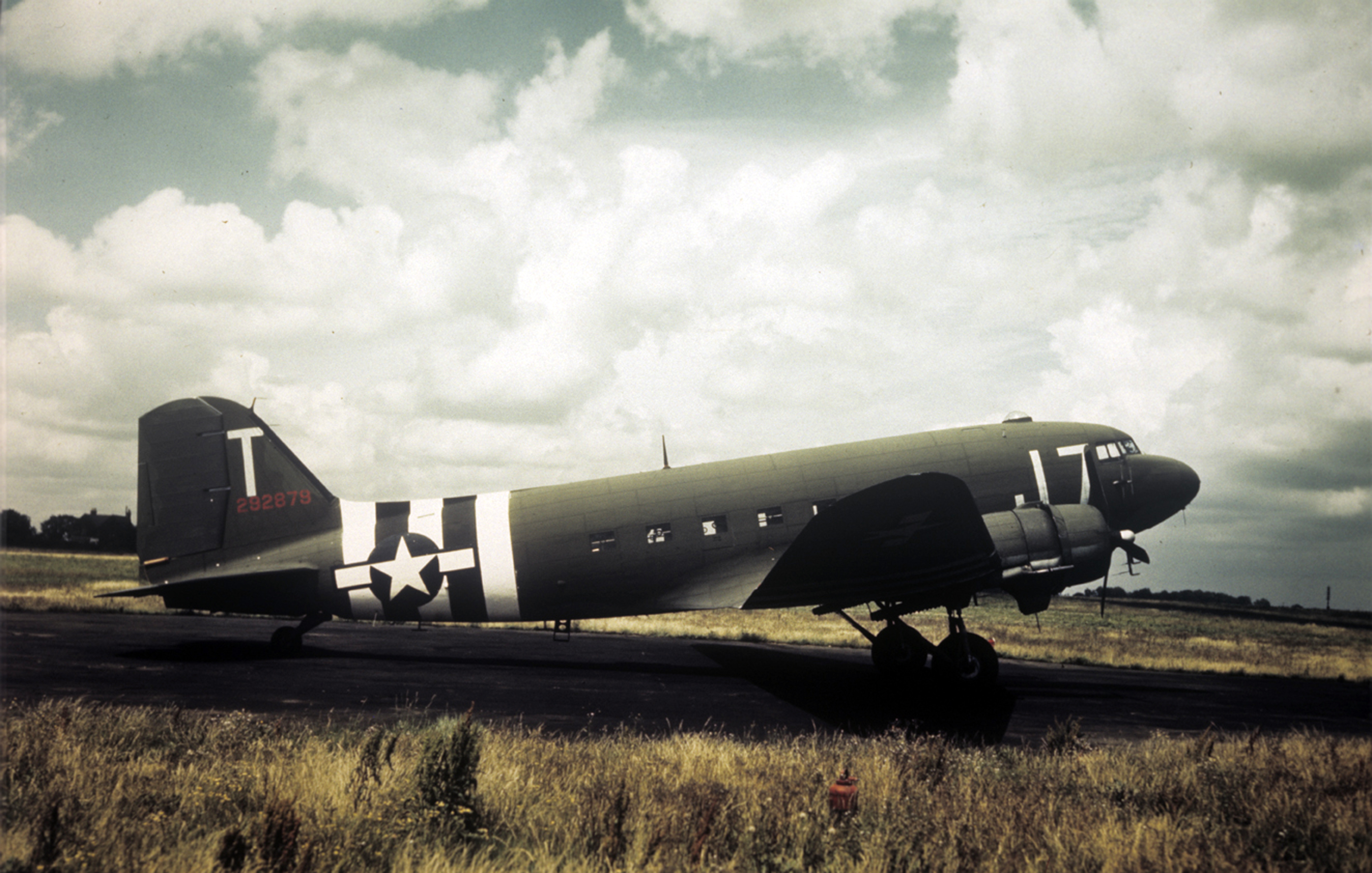
- C-47 of the wing's 442d Troop Carrier Group in D Day markings (Note: Aircraft is Douglas C-47A-15-DK Skytrain, serial 42-92879.)
- Country: United States
- Branch: United States Air Force
- Decorations: Mediterranean Theater of Operations; European Theater of Operations

Insignia
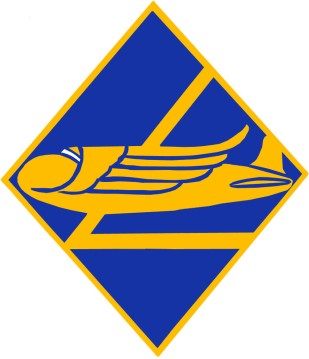
- 50th Troop Carrier Wing emblem (Note: Approved 22 September 1942.)

The 50th Troop Carrier Wing is an inactive United States Air Force unit. The wing was formed in 1941 as the 50th Transport Wing, a headquarters for air transport organizations of the Air Corps. In 1942, it became a training organization for troop carrier units deploying overseas. In 1943, it moved overseas, where its units participated in combat in the Mediterranean and European Theaters of Operations. Following V-E Day it remained in Europe until the fall of 1945. Its last assignment was with Third Air Force at Pope Field, North Carolina, where it was inactivated on 31 July 1946. It was redesignated the 50th Air Division in 1959, but was not activated.

== History ==
The wing was first established as the 50th Transport Wing, then activated at Wright Field, Ohio on 14 January 1941. Although initially assigned directly to the Office, Chief of the Air Corps, it was shortly reassigned to Air Corps Maintenance Command. The wing's mission was to control the air movement of Army materiel within the United States. Within a year, the wing was moving more air freight within the United States than all commercial airlines combined. In March 1942, however, the Army Air Forces directed Air Service Command to increase the use of contracts with airlines to move freight within the United States "in order to free the equipment of the 50th Transport wing for tactical operations with the parachute troops, airborne infantry, the airborne transportation of [government furnished equipment] and supplies, and depot-to-depot operations."

Recognizing this mission change, in July 1942 the wing became the 50th Troop Carrier Wing and formed the core for I Troop Carrier Command, acting as a major training organization until 1943, training subordinate units in the United States prior to overseas deployment.

In October 1943, became a command organization for IX Troop Carrier Command, Ninth Air Force in England. "Subordinate units began training for the invasion of continental Europe. This training involved airdropping paratroops and towing gliders."

"In June 1944, subordinate units dropped paratroops of the 101st Airborne Division in Normandy, subsequently flying numerous missions to bring in reinforcements and needed supplies. During the airborne attack on The Netherlands (Operation Market Garden, September 1944), the 50th dropped paratroops, towed gliders, and flew resupply missions. Several of its subordinate units also participated in the invasion of southern France in August 1944. The 50th supported the 101st Airborne Division in the Battle of the Bulge by towing gliders full of supplies near Bastogne on 27 December 1944. In addition, its units participated in the air assault across the Rhine River in early 1945 and later flew numerous freight missions to carry gasoline, food, medicine, and other supplies to allied ground forces pushing across Germany."

The wing returned to the United States in September 1945. In 1946 it became a subordinate organization of new Tactical Air Command with responsibility for the theater transport (Troop Carrier) mission. It was inactivated on 31 July 1946.

On 1 September 1959, the USAF redesignated the wing as the 50th Air Division; however, the division was never activated.

== Lineage ==
- Established as the 50th Transport Wing on 8 January 1941

Activated on 14 January 1941
Redesignated 50th Troop Carrier Wing on 4 July 1942
Inactivated on 31 July 1946
Redesignated 50th Air Division on 1 September 1959 (Remained inactive)

=== Assignments ===
- Office, Chief of the Air Corps, 14 January 1941
- Air Corps Maintenance Command (later Air Service Command), 15 March 1941
- Air Transport Command (later I Troop Carrier Command), (Note: Not to be confused with Air Transport Command (originally Air Corps Ferrying Command).) 30 April 1942
- Army Service Forces, c. 9 – 15 October 1943
- Ninth Air Force, c. 15 October 1943
- IX Troop Carrier Command, 16 October 1943
- I Troop Carrier Command, 29 September 1945
- IX Troop Carrier Command, 4 November 1945 (Note: On 4 November 1945, I Troop Carrier Command was inactivated at Stout Field, Indiana and its personnel and equipment were transferred to IX Troop Carrier Command, which had transferred to Stout from England without personnel or equipment in September. Maurer, Combat Units, pp. 438, 448–449.)
- Tactical Air Command, 21 March 1946
- Third Air Force, 28 March – 31 July 1946

=== Components ===
Groups

- 10th Transport Group (later 10th Troop Carrier Group): 14 January 1941 – 5 October 1942
- 60th Transport Group: 31 March – 15 June 1942
- 61st Transport Group (later 61st Troop Carrier Group): 31 March – 15 June 1942; 12 October – 3 November 1942
- 62d Transport Group: 14 January 1941 – 15 June 1942
- 63d Transport Group (later 63d Troop Carrier Group): 14 January 1941 – 15 June 1942; 4 May – c. 4 June 1943
- 64th Transport Group: 31 March – 15 June 1952
- 89th Transport Group (later 89th Troop Carrier Group): 1 May – 3 November 1942
- 313th Transport Group (later 313th Troop Carrier Group): 31 March – 15 June 1942; 20 May – 3 August 1945
- 314th Transport Group (later 314th Troop Carrier Group): 31 March – 15 June 1942; 3 November 1942 – c. 13 May 1943
- 315th Transport Group (later 315th Troop Carrier Group): 31 March – 15 June 1942; c. 15 October 1943 – 18 February 1944
- 316th Transport Group (later 316th Troop Carrier Group): 31 March – 12 October 1942; 9 October 1945 – 15 February 1946
- 317th Transport Group: 31 March – 15 June 1942
- 349th Troop Carrier Group: 20 May – 28 August 1945; 9 October 1945 – 15 February 1946
- 375th Troop Carrier Group: c. 19 December 1942 – c. 15 June 1943
- 403d Troop Carrier Group: c. 19 December 1942 – 28 June 1943
- 433d Troop Carrier Group: c. 14 March – 20 April 1943; 1 June – 1 August 1943
- 434th Troop Carrier Group: 9 February – 20 April 1943; c. 15 October 1943 – 3 March 1944
- 435th Troop Carrier Group: c. 22 March – 20 April 1943; c. 1 July – 13 August 1943; 4 November 1943 – 21 February 1944
- 436th Troop Carrier Group: 3 March – 20 April 1943; 10–13 August 1943; c. 15 January – 13 March 1944
- 437th Troop Carrier Group: January – c. 26 August 1944; 10 – 18 July 1945
- 438th Troop Carrier Group: c. 15 February – 15 March 1944; 10 July – 3 August 1945
- 439th Troop Carrier Group: 21 February 1944 – 15 July 1945
- 440th Troop Carrier Group: 11 March 1944 – c. 18 October 1945
- 441st Troop Carrier Group: 17 March 1944 – 9 August 1945
- 442d Troop Carrier Group: 30 March 1944 – 20 May 1945

Squadrons

- 1st Troop Carrier Pathfinder Squadron (Provisional): 19 – 26 May 1945
- 2d Troop Carrier Pathfinder Squadron (Provisional): 13 April – 26 May 1945
- 19th Air Cargo Resupply Squadron: 8 October – 15 November 1945
- 29th Troop Carrier Squadron: attached 20 May – 12 September 1945
- 806th Medical Air Evacuation Transport Squadron: 17 November 1943 – 1 February 1945
- 810th Medical Air Evacuation Transport Squadron: 22 December 1943 – 22 July 1944
- 811th Medical Air Evacuation Transport Squadron: unknown – 1 March 1944
- 813th Medical Air Evacuation Transport Squadron: 1 February – 29 August 1944; 11 September 1944 – 15 September 1945
- 814th Medical Air Evacuation Transport Squadron: 14 February – 7 April 1944
- 815th Medical Air Evacuation Transport Squadron: 1 February – 8 April 1945
- 816th Medical Air Evacuation Transport Squadron: 13 October 1944 – 8 April 1945; 1 July – 3 August 1945
- 817th Medical Air Evacuation Transport Squadron: 1 October 1944 – 17 May 1945; 1 – 27 July 1945
- 818th Medical Air Evacuation Transport Squadron: 22 January – 8 April 1945; 12 May – 3 August 1945

=== Stations ===
- Wright Field, Ohio, 14 January 1941
- Camp Williams, Wisconsin, 25 May 1942
- Sedalia Army Air Field, Missouri, 9 September 1942
- Camp Mackall, North Carolina, 27 April 1943
- Pope Field, North Carolina, 28 July 1943 – 29 September 1943
- RAF Cottesmore (AAF-489), England, 17 October 1943
- RAF Bottesford (AAF-481), England, 18 November 1943
- RAF Exeter (AAF-463), England, 26 April 1944
- Le Mans Airfield (A-35), France, 1 October 1944
- Chartres Airfield (A-40), France, 3 November 1944
- Pope Field, North Carolina, 29 September 1945 – 31 July 1946

=== Aircraft ===
- Bellanca C-27 Airbus, 1941–1942
- Douglas C-33, 1941–1942
- Douglas C-34, 1941–1942
- Douglas C-47 Skytrain, 1941–1945
- Douglas C-50, 1941–1942
- Douglas C-53 Skytrooper, 1941–1945
- Curtiss C-46 Commando, 1944–1946

== See also ==
- List of United States Air Force air divisions
