= 4th Combat Cargo Group =

- Active: 1944–1946
- Country: United States
- Branch: United States Army Air Forces
- Role: Cargo/Troop Carrier
- Part of: Tenth Air Force
- Garrison/HQ: China Burma India Theater of World War II

The 4th Combat Cargo Group was a World War II United States Army Air Forces combat organization that served in Tenth Air Force as part of the China Burma India Theater of World War II.

== Overview ==
Combat Cargo Groups were to be self-contained groups, capable of being 100% operational and always ready to go at a moments notice. The mission of the group was:

- To carry ground troops and auxiliary combat equipment to effective locations in a combat zone
- Maintain combat reinforcements, supply and resupply units in the combat zone
- Evacuate casualties and other personnel from such zones

Seeing that these new units were to be carrying cargo into the heart of the battle, the units were called Combat Cargo Groups.

== History ==
=== Lineage ===
- Constituted as 4th Combat Cargo Group on 9 June 1944

Activated on 13 June
Inactivated on 9 February 1946
Disbanded on 8 October 1948

=== Assignments ===
- I Troop Carrier Command, 13 June-6 November 1944
- Army Air Forces, India-Burma Theater, 28 November 1944
- Combat Cargo Task Force, 15 December 1944
- Unknown (probably Army Air Forces, India-Burma Theater), 24 August 1945 – 9 February 1946

=== Components ===
- 13th Combat Cargo Squadron, 13 June 1944 – 29 December 1945
- 14th Combat Cargo Squadron, 13 June 1944 – 9 February 1945
- 15th Combat Cargo Squadron, 13 June 1944 – 29 December 1945
- 16th Combat Cargo Squadron, 13 June 1944 – 5 September 1945; October-29 December 1945

=== Aircraft flown ===
- Curtiss C-46 Commando, 1944–1945
- Douglas C-47 Skytrain, 1944

=== Stations ===
- Syracuse AAB, New York, 13 June 1944
- Bowman Field, Kentucky, 17 August-6 November 1944
- Sylhet Airfield, India, 28 November 1944
- Agartala Airfield, India, December 1944
- Chittagong Airfield, India, 5 January 1945
- Namponmao Airfield, Burma, June 1945
- Pandaveswar Airfield, India, November 1945
- Panagarh Airfield, India, 15 January-9 February 1946.

=== Operational history ===
Constituted as 4th Combat Cargo Group on 9 June 1944 and activated at Syracuse AAB, NY, on 13 June Initial aircraft assigned was the Douglas C-47. About the time training was completed in the C-47s, the Group moved to Bowman Field, KY, and converted to the larger C-46 aircraft. The Group deployed to CBI during November over the South Atlantic transport route starting at Morrison Field, Florida.

Upon arriving at Sylhet Airfield, India on 28 November 1944, initial flying consisted of air-lifting tar and other airport construction materials from the upper Assam Valley to recently recaptured Myitkyina in northern Burma.

On 15 December the Group was formally assigned to the Combat Cargo Task Force. The goal of the Task Force, a first in the annals of combat, was to provide the total logistic support of ground fighting forces; an army being completely dependent on air support for its continued existence.

The 4th Group started moving supplies into Imphal, India, to develop stockpiles of materiel for the XIV Army imminent drive south. return trips consisted of transporting wounded and passengers to Calcutta or Commilla, India. Sylhet was not a British supply point so the air crews had to go first to Commilie to pick up the supplies destined for Imphal.

At the end of December, the 4th Group moved to Agartala, a supply point south of Sylhet. During this period, the XIV Army had progressed south to the Kabaw Valley and supplies were air-lifted over the 10,000-foot mountains to dirt airstrips quickly hacked out of the jungle. When the XIV Army reached Kalewa, heavy Japanese resistance was encountered. The British forces prevailed and the bridge allowing access to the central Burmese plain was secured. The XIV Army's two Corps split at this time, the 33rd turned east, heading towards Mandalay, while the 4th Corps continued south following the Myittha River

On 5 January 1945, the 4th Group moved from Agartala to Chittagong, India. Chittagong, a large cosmopolitan city on the Bay of Bengal was a major port, rail and highway terminus. This move was accomplished without reduction of the cargo flights to Burma. During early February, the Task Force was supplying the 4th Corps as it moved south with Kan on the Myittha River being a major resupply point; and the 33rd Corps further east at a constantly changing set of dirt strips.

Operations included moving equipment and materials for the Ledo Road; transporting men, mules, and boats when the Allies crossed the Irrawaddy River in February 1945; and dropping Gurkha paratroops during the assault on Rangoon in May 1945.

Moved to Burma in June 1945 and hauled ammunition, gasoline, mules, and men to China until the war ended. After the war ended, some elements of the 4th Group were moved to Shanghai, China. There they assisted in moving Chinese troops to areas in northern china where the communist were beginning to rebel.

In February 1946, the 4th combat cargo group was moved back to Panaagarh, India, where it was ultimately inactivated on 9 February 1946.

== See also ==
- Objective, Burma!
