= 323rd Air Division =

Inactive US Air Force unit

323d Air Division
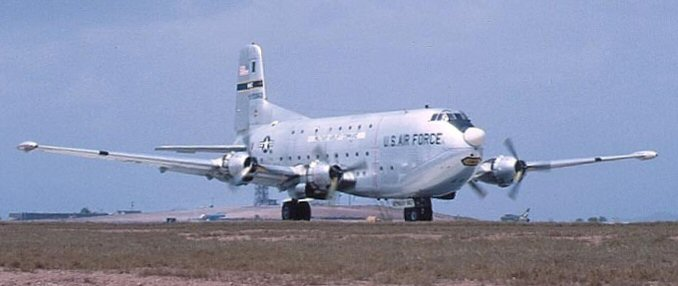
- C-124 Globemaster II
- Active: 1942–1946; 1947–1949; 1958–1960
- Country: United States
- Branch: United States Air Force
- Role: Command of airlift units

Commanders
- Notable commanders: Lt Gen Glenn O. Barcus; Lt Gen Laurence C. Craigie

The 323d Air Division is an inactive United States Air Force unit. Its last assignment was with the Western Transport Air Force at Travis Air Force Base, California, where it was inactivated on 8 May 1960.

The wing was initially active as the Boston Air Defense Wing, an air defense organization during World War II. In 1944, when the perception of a possible air attack on the United States diminished, it was stripped of its personnel. After a short hiatus, it became the 323d Combat Crew Training Wing and trained heavy bomber aircrews until the end of the war.

It was active again in the reserves as the 323d Troop Carrier Wing from 1947 to 1949. During this period, it became the 323d Air Division before being inactivated in 1949 during a major reorganization of the air reserve.

Its final active period began in 1958 when Military Air Transport Service (MATS) took over Travis from Strategic Air Command (SAC). It managed support activities at Travis for SAC and MATS.

== History ==
=== World War II ===
The division was first organized at Logan Airport, Massachusetts in the summer of 1942 as the Boston Air Defense Wing, an air defense organization, reporting to First Air Force, and responsible for the air defense of the Boston metropolitan area, operating Curtiss P-40 Warhawks and Republic P-47 Thunderbolts. Its original components were the 79th Fighter Group, stationed at Bedford Army Air Field and the 325th Fighter Group, stationed at Hillsgrove Army Air Field. Most of its components were assigned for brief periods, as it also trained fighter organizations and personnel. As the possibility of an air attack on the east coast became increasingly remote, the wing's manpower was withdrawn in July 1944.

In February 1945, it was redesignated the 323d Combat Crew Training Wing and was remanned. It served as a training organization for very heavy bomber personnel with Boeing B-29 Superfortresss until August when its personnel was again withdrawn. It continued as a "paper" unit until it was inactivated in 1946.

=== Cold War ===
The unit was redesignated the 323d Troop Carrier Wing and was reactivated as a reserve unit under Air Defense Command (ADC) on 1 August 1947 at Stout Field, Indiana. It was assigned reserve troop carrier groups at Stout and Godman Air Force Base, Kentucky. In 1948 the Air Force implemented the wing base organization. As a result, along with the other multi-base wings of Continental Air Command (ConAC), the wing was redesignated as an air division. ConAC assumed reserve management responsibility from ADC in 1948. It was inactivated in June 1949 when ConAC implemented the wing base organization and most of its personnel and equipment were transferred to the newly formed 434th Troop Carrier Wing at nearby Atterbury Air Force Base.

From July 1958 to May 1960, the division maintained military air transport and support facilities and provided base support for all tenant organizations at Travis Air Force Base, California. It conducted peacetime operations such as airlifting cargo, troops, personnel, patients, and mail.

== Lineage ==
- Constituted as the Boston Air Defense Wing on 6 August 1942

Activated on 11 August 1942
Redesignated Boston Fighter Wing on 24 July 1943
Redesignated 323d Combat Crew Training Wing on 13 February 1945
Inactivated on 8 April 1946

- Redesignated 323d Troop Carrier Wing on 2 July 1947

Activated in the reserve on 1 August 1947
Redesignated 323d Air Division, Troop Carrier on 16 April 1948
Inactivated on 27 June 1949

- Redesignated 323d Air Division on 27 June 1958

Activated on 1 July 1958
Discontinued on 8 May 1960

=== Assignments ===
- I Fighter Command, 11 August 1942
- Third Air Force, 13 February 1945
- III Bomber Command, 22 February 1945 – 8 April 1946
- Eleventh Air Force, (Note: This Eleventh Air Force was formed in 1946 to command reserve units, and is not related to the Eleventh Air Force operating in Alaska.) 1 August 1947
- Tenth Air Force, 1 July 1948 – 27 June 1949
- Western Transport Air Force, 1 July 1958 – 8 May 1960

=== Components ===
- 58th Fighter Group: c. 3 March 1943 – c. 22 October 1943
- 79th Fighter Group: 11 August 1942 – 28 September 1942
- 325th Fighter Group: 11 August 1942 – 13 February 1943
- 348th Fighter Group: 30 September 1942 – 9 May 1943
- 352d Fighter Group: 1 October 1942 – c. 28 January 1943
- 356th Fighter Group: 4 July 1943 – 15 August 1943
- 359th Fighter Group: 23 August 1943 – 2 October 1943
- 362d Fighter Group: 22 June 1943 – 19 October 1943
- 434th Troop Carrier Group: 17 October 1947 – 27 June 1949
- 436th Troop Carrier Group: 17 October 1947 – 1 July 1948

=== Stations ===
- Logan Airport, Massachusetts, 11 August 1942
- MacDill Field, Florida, c. 22 February 1945 – 8 April 1946
- Stout Field, Indiana, 1 August 1947 – 27 June 1949
- Travis Air Force Base, California, 1 July 1958 – 8 May 1960

=== Aircraft ===
- Curtiss P-40 Warhawk, 1942–1943
- Republic P-47 Thunderbolt, 1942–1943
- Boeing B-29 Superfortress, 1945
- Douglas C-124 Globemaster II, 1958–1960
- Douglas C-133 Cargomaster, 1958–1960

=== Commanders ===
- Col Minthorne W. Reed, 11 August 1942
- Col Glenn O. Barcus, 25 March 1943
- Col Laurence C. Craigie, 6 April 1943
- Lt Col Bingham T. Kleine, 11 June 1943
- Col Louis M. Merrick, 22 July 1943
- Lt Col J. Marshall Booker, 29 April – c. 31 July 1944
- none (not manned), c. 31 July 1944 – 21 February 1945
- Col Howard Moore, 22 February 1945
- Col Frank Allen, 29 May 1945 – unknown
- none (not manned), August 1945 – 8 April 1946
- Unknown, 1 August 1947 – 27 June 1949
- Brig Gen George F. McGuire, 1 July 1958
- Col Charles W. Stark, 15 February – c. 8 May 1960

Service Streamer	Campaign	Dates	Notes
	American Theater without inscription	11 August 1942 – 2 March 1946	Boston Air Defense Wing (later Boston Fighter Wing, 323d Combat Crew Training Wing)

== See also ==
- List of United States Air Force air divisions
- List of B-29 Superfortress operators
