= Voltone Airfield =

World War II military airfield

Voltone Airfield
- Part of Twelfth Air Force

Site information
- Type: Military airfield
- Controlled by: United States Army Air Forces

Location
- Coordinates: 42°15′13.25″N 011°42′23.59″E (Approximate)

Site history
- Built: 1944
- In use: 1944

Location of Valtone Airfield, Italy

Voltone Airfield is an abandoned World War II military airfield, located approximately 4 km west of Tarquinia (Provincia di Viterbo, Lazio), central Italy, about 70 km northwest of Rome.

It was an all-weather temporary field built by the XII Engineer Command using a graded earth compacted surface, with prefabricated hessian (burlap) surfacing (PHS). PHS was made of an asphalt-impregnated jute rolled out over the compacted surface over a square mesh track (SMT) grid of wire joined in 3-inch squares. Pierced Steel Planking was also used for parking areas, as well as for dispersal sites, when it was available. In addition, tents were used for billeting and support facilities; an access road was built to the existing road infrastructure; a dump for supplies, ammunition, and gasoline drums; drinkable water and a minimal electrical grid for communications and station lighting.

Once completed it was turned over for use by the United States Army Air Force Twelfth Air Force 415th Night Fighter Squadron between 17 June-9 July 1944, flying Bristol Beaufighters.

When the Americans pulled out, the airfield was dismantled by engineers. Today the location of the airfield is partially a golf course bisected by a road with the outline of its former main runway on the other side in a pasture.
