= I Troop Carrier Command =

- Active: 1942–1945
- Country: United States
- Branch: United States Army; United States Air Force (Note: When the United States Air Force was established in September 1947, all former Army Air Forces units, including those not active, like the I Troop Carrier Command were transferred to the new service.)
- Role: Airlift training
- Motto: Vincit Qui Primum Gerit Latin He Conquers Who Gets There First
- Engagements: American Theater of World War II

The I Troop Carrier Command is a disbanded United States Air Force unit. Its last assignment was with Continental Air Forces, at Stout Field, Indiana, where it was disbanded in November 1945, and its resources transferred to IX Troop Carrier Command.

The command trained units aircrews for the theater airlift mission. It also trained aeromedical evacuation units and airlift units supporting special forces It was assigned directly to Army Air Forces (AAF) headquarters for the majority of the war, and was reassigned to Continental Air Forces in the spring of 1945. The command coordinated its activity with the Army Air Forces Training Command, from which it drew its crews. It conducted operational training, shifting to replacement training later in the war The troop carrier units and crews it produced served in all overseas combat theaters.

== History ==
=== Background ===
Perhaps one of the more dramatic innovations in military tactics during World War II was the landing of airborne forces behind enemy lines. The American public was impressed by the sight, in newsreels and photos, of skies filled with billowing parachutes, as men fell earthward to encircle the enemy. The hardened paratrooper, with his peculiar gear, became a special kind of fighting hero, and his jumping cry, "Geronimo," became almost a byword.

While specially trained ground soldiers did the fighting after the landings, it was the responsibility of the Army Air Forces (AAF) to make the deliveries of men and supplies. To carry out this responsibility was the mission of AAF troop carrier units, serving under theater or task force commanders in cooperation with ground force elements. The training of these units, which had to be able to perform all phases of airborne operations, was the function of I Troop Carrier Command. Troop carrier headquarters was located throughout the war at Stout Field, Indianapolis, Indiana.

In addition to the transport crews, which normally consisted of pilot, co-pilot, navigator, radio operator, and aerial engineer, some 5,000 Waco CG-4 glider pilots were prepared for their special function.

=== Formation ===
The command was formed on 30 April 1942 as the Air Transport Command, with headquarters at Washington, DC. Its first operational unit was the 50th Transport Wing, which was transferred from Air Service Command. The command was assigned directly to Headquarters Army Air Forces, However, its original designation was preferred as a new name for Air Corps Ferrying Command, whose functions had expanded beyond the limits implied by its title. Accordingly, the command was redesignated the I Troop Carrier Command.

The command's mission was "the training of troop carrier units, which provide for the air movement of air landing troops and equipment, including glider-borne troops troops and parachute troops and equipment; and for the training of air evacuation units."

The AAF established the troop carrier mission as one of the four combat missions of the Army Air Forces – bombardment, pursuit or fighter, reconnaissance and troop carrier.

=== Crew training ===
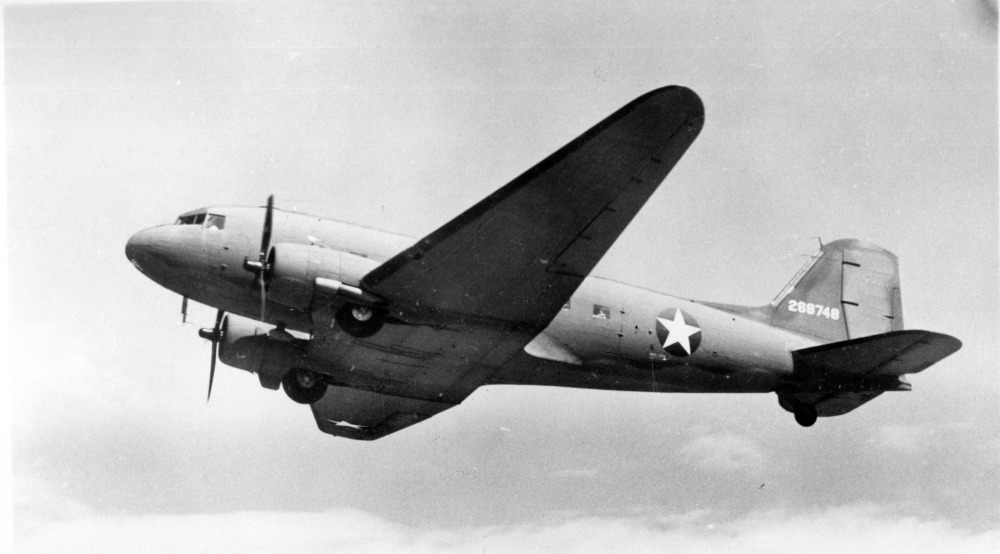
C-53 Skytrooper (Note: Aircraft is Douglas C-53-DO Skytrooper, serial 42-68748)

In the early stages of training, the command relied heavily on airline pilots as instructors, and used various models of the Douglas DC-3 obtained from airlines, in addition to C-47s produced for the military for training. (Note: DC-3 type airliners impressed for service became C-48, C-49, C-50, C-51, or C-52s, depending on their equipment. However the C-47 Skytrain and C-53 Skytrooper were the primary variants used by the command.) Later, the command began to train crews on the larger Curtiss C-46 Commando, and by the end of the war, the command was exclusively training with the C-46.

The Operational - Replacement Training Units (OTU-RTU) system of operational training, which was used in the fighter and bombardment training programs, was also adopted for troop carrier instruction. Command training drew from the graduates of AAF Training Command two-engine flight schools for the pilot and co-pilot, along with a newly graduated navigator, radio operator and an aerial engineer from AAF Training Command technical schools to complete a troop carrier aircrew for the C-47.

Individual crew members were expected to show proficiency in skills normally exercised by the corresponding specialists of bombardment crews, however proficiency in aerial gunnery was not required because the troop transports carried no armament. Members of troop carrier crews, on the other hand, had special duties not required in other types of combat units. The pilot, for example, had to be capable of glider towing and to be familiar with the flight characteristics of gliders, while the aerial engineer had to know how to attach glider tow ropes and operate and maintain glider pickup equipment.

A unique characteristic troop of carrier aircrews was the ability to make accurate drops of aerial delivery containers, both free and parachuted, into small clearings surrounded by natural obstacles. This mission, especially important in the Pacific and CBI theaters supported small units of soldiers and commando units behind enemy lines where aerial resupply was their only means of sustainment. This mission also required the crew to employ "kickers", men whose duty was literally to "kick" the resupply containers out of the door of the aircraft, which was usually flying at low level and vulnerable to enemy ground weapons fire.

Troop carrier squadrons and groups had to demonstrate skill in unit operations, including the transportation of paratroops, and the towing and releasing of loaded gliders in mass flights. Special curricula for the meeting of these standards were developed by I Troop Carrier Command.

Besides the combat element of their mission, troop carrier units had the mission of transportation of personnel, supplies and equipment within a theater of operations. Troop carrier squadrons frequently operated out of rough airfields (Advanced Landing Grounds) near the front lines, carrying everything from gasoline, small-arms munitions, artillery shells, food, medical supplies, tents and other necessities to support the front-line units in the field. The landing grounds might be manned by AAF units or unmanned. They were located in the deserts of North Africa, farmers' fields in Italy and France, or in a carved out strip of jungle in Burma, the Philippines or New Guinea. Specially-equipped medical evacuation C-47s would land near field hospitals to transport casualties to rear area hospitals for follow-on medical treatment.

=== Paratrooper training ===
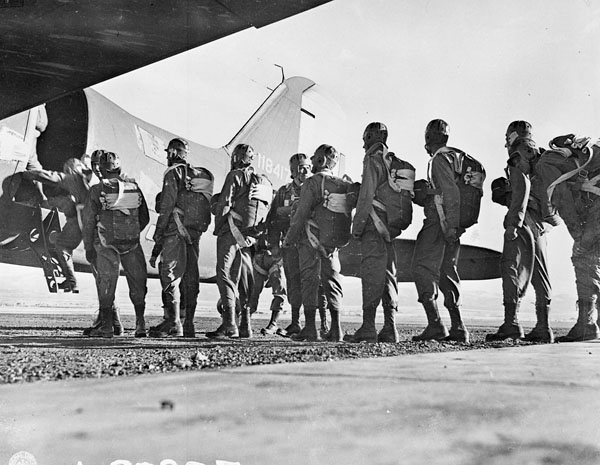
Paratroopers boarding a C-47 for a training jump

or during the final portion of it, troop carrier units engaged in combined exercises with elements of the Airborne Command (Army Ground Forces). It was not coincidental that several of the command's training schools were located on Army airfields on or near Army airborne division training camps. Pope Field was on Fort Bragg, home of the 82nd Airborne Division and later 11th Airborne Division. Grenada Field, Mississippi was located near Camp Claiborne, Louisiana, home of the 101st Airborne Division; Laurinburg-Maxton Army Air Base, North Carolina, was frequently the location of joint exercises between troop carrier units and Army airborne units.

Several realistic training maneuvers between the Army airborne and Air Force troop carrier units were held. These maneuvers, which lasted for about two months, were divided into three phases. The first consisted of small-scale operations in which a company of airborne soldiers was transported, then would parachute out of aircraft into designated drop zones. The scale of movement was increased in the second period, and during the final phase whole divisions were moved as units over distances up to 300 miles, with both parachutists and towed CG-4 gliders being landed, frequently on auxiliary training airfields. After the exercise was completed, training in glider retrieval by the troop carrier units was conducted.

In each stage of combined training the troop carrier groups placed emphasis upon single- and double-tow of gliders under combat conditions and upon night operations. Attention was given to all types of airborne assignments, including resupply and evacuation by air.

=== Glider training ===
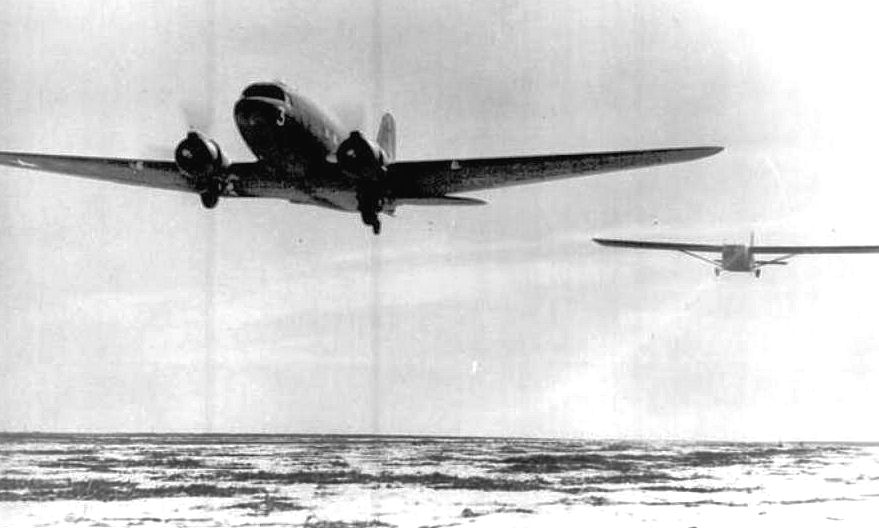
C-47 towing a Waco CG-4 glider at Dalhart AAF

One of the most difficult problems, unique to the troop carrier program, was that of training glider pilots. The principal trouble occurred in the individual training phase, which was the responsibility of the AAF Training Command, but the consequences were naturally felt by I Troop Carrier Command.

In the AAF's original concept, glider pilots would be existing power pilots. However, the shortage of such personnel in 1942 called for a drastic revision of policy, especially after the requirement for glider pilots was increased from an initial 1,000 to 6,000 earlier that year. Offers were made to enlisted men with no flying experience at all, with the promise that they would graduate as staff sergeants. Those with rank above private would go through training in their grade and become sergeants at the end. Those with previous flying experience were also sought, and this policy brought in a lot of washouts from power pilot training.

Also, an early decision was made to have the future glider pilots trained under contract to civilian schools. The main operation got under way at Twenty-Nine Palms Air Academy, in the California desert, where thermal conditions were great for soaring flights. Sailplane thinking still prevailed. By being able to soar – gain altitude on rising air currents – and therefore stay up longer on a given flight, the student would conceivably receive more instruction per flight. It was not long, however, before the military woke up to the fact that troop gliders were not simply bigger sailplanes that made long straight glides into enemy territory. They were, rather, low-performance trailers that had to be towed to a point almost directly over the landing area, and once over the designated spot, the real piloting skills necessary to reach the ground quickly in one piece took over, if one wanted to survive. As a consequence, the sailplane trainers were abandoned as soon as sufficient quantities of the Waco CG-4A were available for advanced training. In the U.S. services the glider pilots, whether the view was unwarranted or not, were considered a notable cut below power pilots. They had a separate rating of Glider Pilot, with appropriate "G" wings, and were originally mostly sergeants.

Once they received their wings, the command assigned glider pilots to existing troop carrier squadrons that were training. A glider unit was attached to the troop carrier squadron as a flight, and trained along with the squadron. The glider unit was then deployed as part of the troop carrier unit after training was complete. The OTU-RTU curriculum for glider pilots in I Troop Carrier Command included a transition phase on the CG-4A for those pilots trained on sailplanes and an advanced phase requiring forty landings under full-load conditions. Pickup exercises were also required, as well as indoctrination in the important after-landing procedures.

However, training of early troop carrier groups in glider operations was minimal. In early 1944, the command gradually introduced specialized training in glider operations, based on input received from Ninth Air Force. By the end of 1944 it was decided to restrict glider instruction to rated power pilots, because they were available in sufficient numbers and could serve a dual purpose in troop carrier units.

=== Specialized training ===
==== Combat cargo units ====
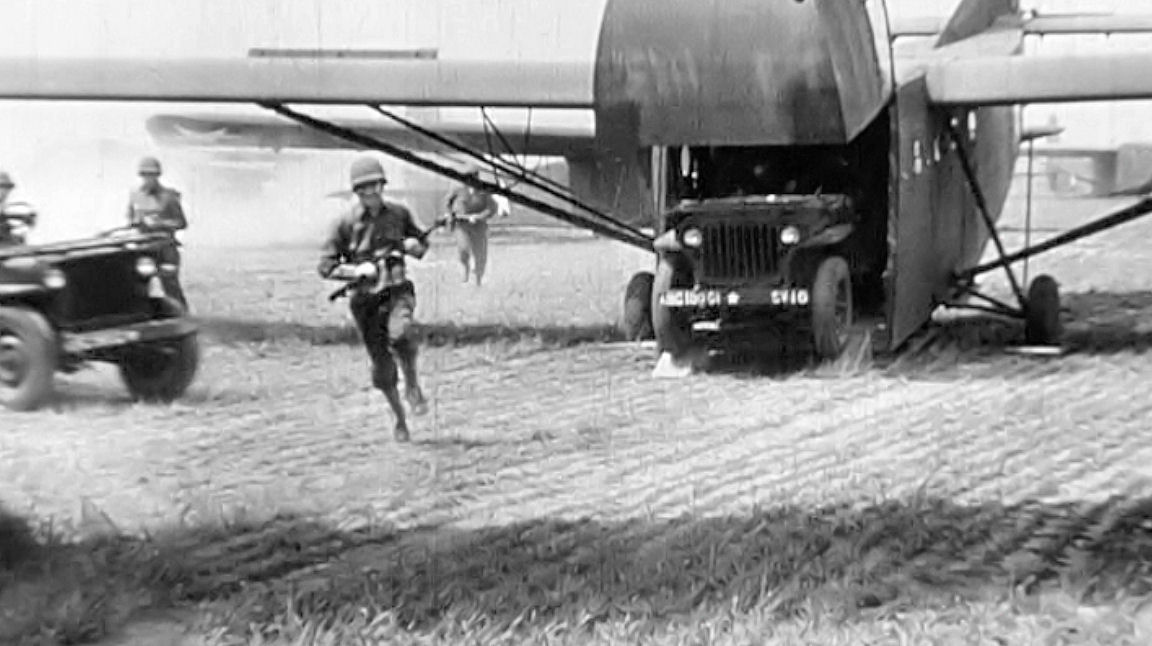
Airborne troops and a jeep coming out of a CG-4A Waco glider, during a training exercise in 1944

In addition to the troop carrier groups, three specialized units, the 1st, 2d and 4th Combat Cargo Groups were trained by I Troop Carrier Command (the 3d Combat Cargo Group was formed in Burma by Tenth Air Force). These groups, destined for the China-Burma-India Theater and Southwest Pacific Theater, supported both front-line ground units as well as commando-type ground forces which operated behind enemy lines performing special operations missions.

The combat cargo groups carried out airborne resupply and evacuation missions of wounded, and gliders for assault missions. Commando units would parachute at low altitude behind enemy lines, perform their mission, then either walk out to friendly territory, or a small group of C-47s would clandestinely land at a rough airstrip to pick them up.

Additional training, particularly in locating small groups of men in camouflaged areas by the use of sunlit signal mirrors was especially important, as radio communications with commando units was not always possible. Signal mirrors and hand held airborne beacon light training in morse code was carried out for communications between the aircraft and men on the ground. "Kicker" training was also carried out so resupply drops would be made accurately into small clearings.

==== Pathfinder training ====
The command also conducted pathfinder training, establishing a school at Stout Field in September 1944 for their training. Pathfinder crews included a navigator and radio operator who were given special training on radar equipment. The pathfinder mission was to locate landing zones, where paratroopers were dropped to set up navigational aids to direct the airborne force to more accurate assaults.

==== Aeromedical evacuation ====
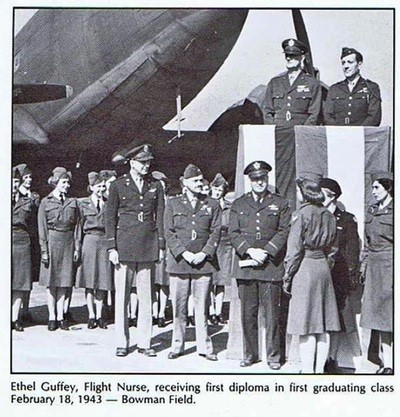
First Flight Nurse graduation

In January 1943, the command's 349th Air Evacuation Group was given the mission of individual training for flight surgeons, nurses and medical technicians who were to compose medical air evacuation squadrons and to provide operational training that would prepare these units for deployment to combat theaters. This type of organization was entirely new. The training was placed under the command in the expectation that evacuation squadrons would work closely with troop carrier units and would possess their own light aircraft.

Despite the expectation that the 349th would act as an Operational Training Unit. experience showed that the work to be done was more like a school, and in June 1943, the 349th was disbanded and replaced by the AAF School of Air Evacuation. By early 1944, unit training had been completed and the school concentrated on individual training. In May, the Ferrying Division, Air Transport Command was assigned responsibility for aeromedical evacuation in the United States and the school was transferred to it. In October 1944, the school became a department of the School of Aviation Medicine at Randolph Field, Texas. To provided realistic field training for the school's students, I Troop Carrier Command maintained a detachment of aircraft at Randolph to support the school.

=== Reassignment and disbanding ===
Just before the end of the war in Europe, the command was reassigned to Continental Air Forces, as that headquarters became fully operational. Between December 1942 and August 1945, the command trained 4,608 aircrews for overseas service, It was disbanded on 4 November 1945 and its mission and personnel were transferred to IX Troop Carrier Command, which had returned from Europe to Stout Field on paper in September.

== Lineage ==
- Established as the Air Transport Command on 30 April 1942

Redesignated I Troop Carrier Command on 4 July 1942
Disbanded on 4 November 1945

=== Assignments ===
- Headquarters, United States Army Air Forces, 30 April 1942
- Continental Air Forces, April 1945 – 4 November 1945

=== Components ===
Wings

- 50th Transport Wing (later 50th Troop Carrier Wing): 30 April 1942 – c. 9 October 1943, 29 September 1945 – 21 March 1946
- 51st Transport Wing (later 51st Troop Carrier Wing): 1 June – c. 18 August 1942
- 52d Transport Wing (later 52d Troop Carrier Wing): 5 June 1942 – 8 May 1943, July 1945-27 August 1946
- 53d Troop Carrier Wing: 1 August 1942 – 11 March 1944
- 60th Troop Carrier Wing: 12 June 1943 – 8 October 1945
- 61st Troop Carrier Wing: 13 June 1943 – 4 October 1945

Groups

- 1st Combat Cargo Group: 15 April – 24 August 1944
- 2d Combat Cargo Group: 1 May – November 1944
- 4th Combat Cargo Group: 13 June – November 1944
- 10th Troop Carrier Group: 15 February 1943 – 14 April 1944
- 61st Troop Carrier Group
- 89th Troop Carrier Group: 24 December 1942 – 26 February 1944
- 313th Troop Carrier Group
- 316th Troop Carrier Group
- 349th Air Evacuation Group: 7 October 1942 – 23 June 1943
- 349th Troop Carrier Group: November 1944 – April 1945
- 375th Troop Carrier Group: 18 November 1942 – 1 May 1943
- 403d Troop Carrier Group: 12 December 1942 – 1 May 1943
- 433d Troop Carrier Group: 9 February – February 1943
- 434th Troop Carrier Group: 9 February – February 1943
- 435th Troop Carrier Group 437th Troop Carrier Group: 1 May 1943 – February 1944; 6 August – 4 November 1945
- 438th Troop Carrier Group
- 439th Troop Carrier Group: 1 June 1943 – c 10 March 1944; September 1945 – c. 4 November 1945 (Note: Robertson says the group was assigned until c. December 1945, but the command was disbanded on 4 November 1945. Maurer, Combat Units, p. 438.)
- 440th Troop Carrier Group: 1 July 1943 – July 1943
- 441st Troop Carrier Group
- 442d Troop Carrier Group: 17 December 1943 – 26 January 1944
- 443d Troop Carrier Group

Squadrons

- 38th Medical Air Ambulance Squadron (later 507th Air Evacuation Squadron): 25 May – 7 October 1942
- 44th Troop Carrier Squadron: May – 3 August 1945
- 45th Troop Carrier Squadron: May – 9 September 1945
- 309th Troop Carrier Squadron: 15 February – 21 April 1944
- 310th Troop Carrier Squadron: 15 February – 21 April 1944
- 311th Troop Carrier Squadron: 1 December 1944 – 9 February 1945
- 316th Troop Carrier Squadron: 15 December 1943 – 4 November 1944 (attached to 61st Troop Carrier Wing, 15 December 1943; 1st Provisional Troop Carrier Group, February – 30 September 44)
- 507th Air Evacuation Squadron (Heavy): see 38th Medical Air Ambulance Squadron

Base Units

- 800th AAF Base Unit (Administrative Unit, I Troop Carrier Command) later (Hq, I Troop Carrier Command): 14 April 44 – 4 November 45

Stout Field

- 801st AAF Base Unit (Headquarters, 60th Troop Carrier Wing): 15 April 1944 – 8 October 1945

Pope Field

- 802nd AAF Base Unit (Headquarters, 61st Troop Carrier Wing): 15 April 1944 – 5 October 1945

Sedalia Army Air Field

- 805th AAF Base Unit (Replacement Training Unit, Troop Carrier) later (Combat Crew Training School, Troop Carrier): 15 April 1944 – 1 May 1945

Alliance Army Air Field (later George Field)

- 806th AAF Base Unit (Processing Out); 15 April 44 – c. June 1945

Baer Field

- 807th AAF Base Unit (Combat Crew Training School, Troop Carrier): 15 April 1944 – 8 October 1945

Bergstrom Field

- 808th AAF Base Unit (School of Air Evacuation): 15 April 1944 – 25 May 1944

Bowman Field

- 809th AAF Base Unit (Combat Crew Training School, Troop Carrier): 16 Jun 1945 – 8 October 1945

Blytheville Air Force Base

- 810th AAF Base Unit (Combat Crew Training School, Troop Carrier): 14 April 1944 – 8 October 1945

Laurinburg-Maxton Army Air Field

- 811th AAF Base Unit (Parachute Flight Training): 15 April 1944 – March 1945

Lawson Field

- 812th AAF Base Unit (Combat Crew Training School, Troop Carrier): 15 April 1944 – 8 October 1945

Pope Field

- 813th AAF Base Unit (Combat Crew Training School, Troop Carrier): 15 April 1944 – 8 October 1945

Fairfax Field, then Sedalia Army Air Field

- 814th AAF Base Unit (Glider Testing & Ferrying, Troop Carrier): 14 April 1944 – 8 October 1945

Stout Fld

- 815th AAF Base Unit (Operational Training Unit, Troop Carrier): 16 June 1944 – 30 Jun 1945

Malden Regional Airport

- 816th AAF Base Unit (Transition Training Unit, Troop Carrier): 16 June 1944 – 1 October 1945

Alliance Army Air Field

- 817th AAF Base Unit (Operational Training Unit, Troop Carrier): 14 April 1944 – 30 June 1945

Kellogg Field

- 817th AAF Base Unit (Advanced Training Unit, Troop Carrier): 30 June 1945 – c. 8 October 1945

Malden Regional Airport

- 818th AAF Base Unit (Operational Training Unit, Troop Carrier): 30 June 1945 – 8 October 1945

Marfa Army Air Field

Other

- AAF School of Air Evacuation: 23 June 1943 – 25 May 1944

=== Stations ===
- Washington, DC, 30 April 1942
- Stout Field, Indiana, c. 20 May 1942 – 4 November 1945.

=== Campaign ===
Campaign Streamer	Campaign	Dates	Notes
	American Theater without inscription	30 April 1942 – 4 November 1945	Air Transport Command (later I Troop Carrier Command)

== See also ==
- I Troop Carrier Command Airfields
- Army Air Forces Training Command
- Operational - Replacement Training Units
