= 434th Operations Group =

United States Air Force Reserve unit

434th Operations Group

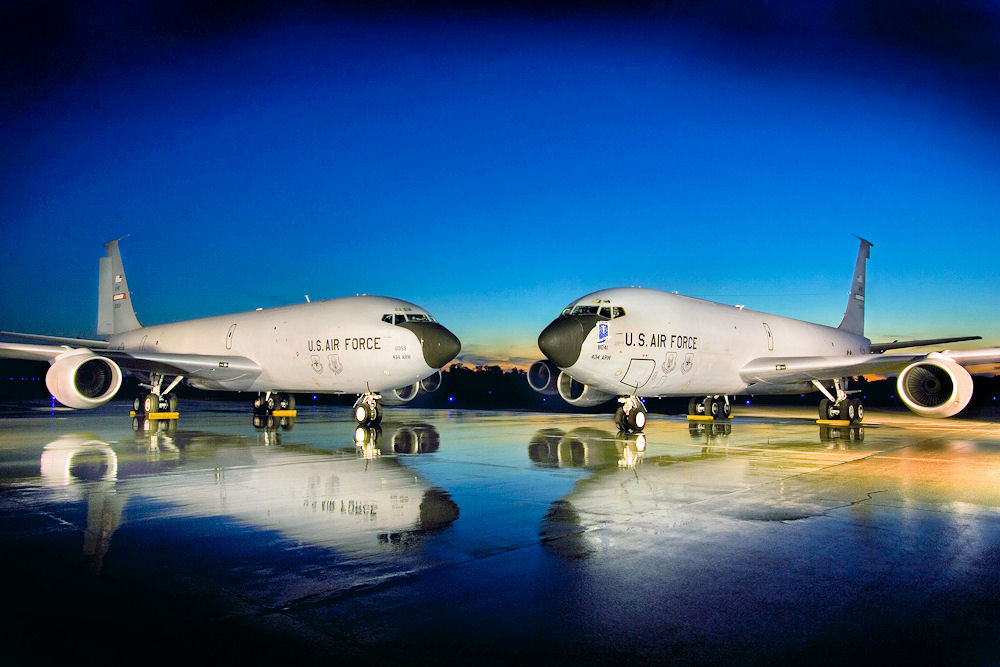
- 434th Group KC-135R Stratotankers
- Active: 1943–1946; 1947–1953; 1953–1959; 1992–present
- Country: United States
- Branch: United States Air Force
- Role: Aerial refueling
- Part of: Air Force Reserve Command
- Garrison/HQ: Grissom Air Reserve Base
- Decorations: Distinguished Unit Citation; French Croix de Guerre with Palm

Insignia
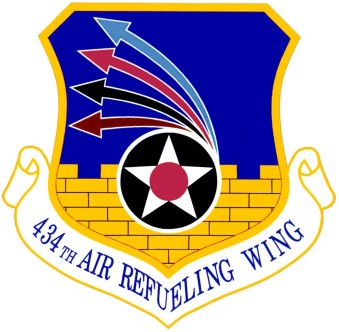
- 434th Operations Group emblem (Approved 5 June 1995)
- Tail marking: Red band with "Grissom" in white

The 434th Operations Group (434 OG) is an active United States Air Force Reserve unit. It is the flying component of the Fourth Air Force 434th Air Refueling Wing, stationed at Grissom Air Reserve Base, Indiana.

The unit's World War II predecessor unit, the 434th Troop Carrier Group was a C-47 Skytrain transport unit assigned to Ninth Air Force in Western Europe. The group flew combat paratroopers on airborne assaults on Normandy (Operation Overlord); Southern France (Operation Dragoon); the Netherlands (Operation Market-Garden), and Germany (Operation Varsity). It also flew combat resupply missions in the relief of Bastogne in 1945.

== Overview ==
The mission of the 434 OG is to provide mid-air refueling to long-range bombers, fighters, and cargo aircraft. It flies the Boeing KC-135R Stratotanker.

The 434 OG is one of the key refueling units in the Air Force Reserve. The group regularly participates in exercises and front-line operations to support America's national interests. It is composed of the following squadrons:

- 434th Operations Support Squadron
- 72d Air Refueling Squadron (Blue tail stripe)
- 74th Air Refueling Squadron (Red tail stripe)

== History ==
=== World War II ===
Media related to 434th Troop Carrier Group (United States Army Air Forces) at Wikimedia Commons

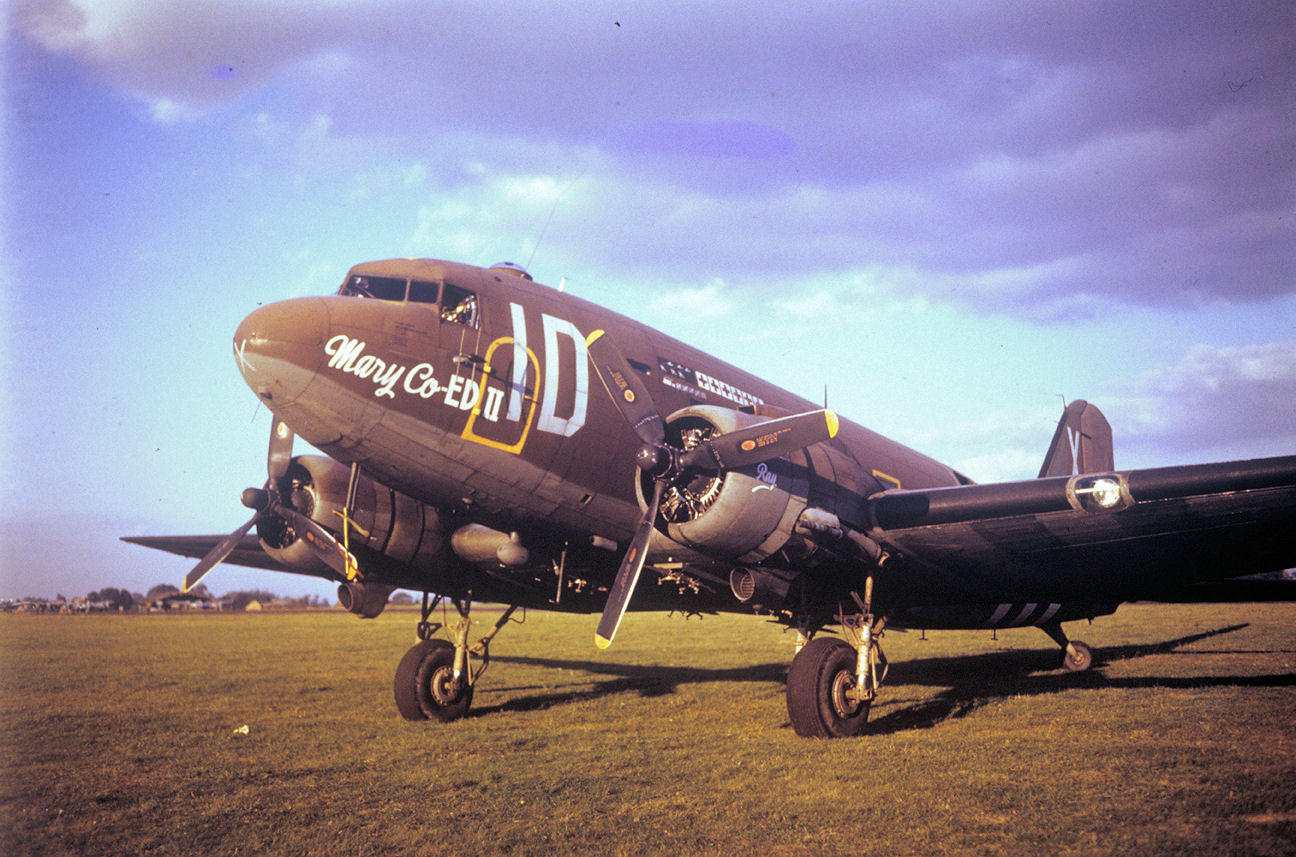
Douglas C-47 of the 74th Troop Carrier Squadron.

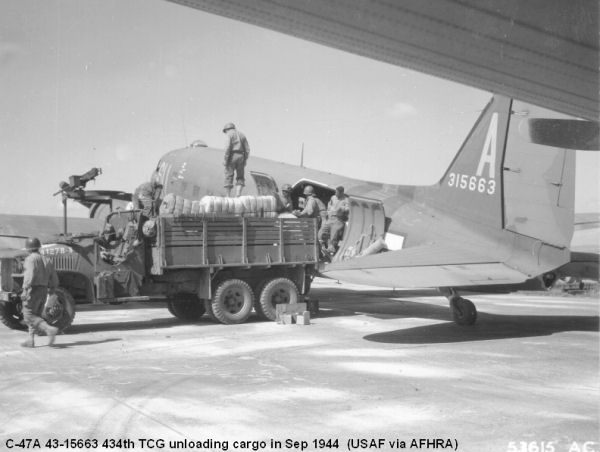
Douglas C-47A-90-DL, Serial 43-15663 of the 72d Troop Carrier Squadron.

Established as the 434th Troop Carrier Group on 30 January 1943. Trained in the U.S., moving to England, late September–October 1943, for operations with Ninth Air Force. Moved to RAF Fulbeck, England in October 1943.

The 434th TCW was assigned to the 53rd Troop Carrier Wing. Shortly after its arrival at Fulbeck, the group was reassigned to RAF Aldermaston in the Salisbury Plain area to co-locate with 101st Airborne Division in preparation for the invasion of northern France.

The 434th was one of the groups trained and designated to deliver gliders on D-Day. As the assigned delivery group for Mission Chicago, the 52 C-47s of the 434th TCG each towed a Waco CG-4A glider to Normandy, losing one aircraft to flak in the darkness. For this, and two follow-up missions with gliders and supplies, the group was later awarded the coveted Distinguished Unit Citation.

The 434th TCG spent the summer of 1944 mainly in carrying freight, fuel and troops to France. It was not involved in the invasion of southern France(as were several of the UK based C-47 groups) and its next combat operation was 'Market', the airborne operation in the Netherlands on 17 September.

Two serials (the term for a specifically briefed formation) of 45 C-47s each dropped paratroops of the 101st Airborne Division in the Veghcl sector. Heavy flak shot down four aircraft and damaged 10 of the first serial and another plane was lost from the second serial plus nine damaged. Next day, 80 of the group's aircraft towed gliders to a landing zone in the Son area. Seven gliders landed prematurely, two of them in the sea, and flak brought down two C-47s and damaged 33.

Some 82 aircraft towing gliders were despatched on 19 September and one C-47 failed to return. A total of 20 gliders were lost before reaching release point. This most intensive period of troop carrier operations continued on the 20th when 53 C-47s took off on a re-supply mission to Overasselt. The drop was scattered but all aircraft returned. A final re-supply mission was carried out from Ramsbury but by now the situation on the ground was beyond retrieval.

The 434th remained at Aldermaston until 12 February 1945 when the group moved to an Advanced Landing Ground (ALG) at Mourmclon-le-Grand airfield (ALG A-80) in France. From France, the group participated in the airborne assault across the Rhine, dropping paratroops over the east bank on 24 March. In addition to these airborne operations, the group reinforced ground troops in the St Lo area during the breakthrough in July 1944; provided supplies for Third Army during its drive across France in Aug, an action for which the group was cited by the French Government; and resupplied troops at Bastogne in December 1944 in the effort to stop the German offensive in the Ardennes. Also engaged in numerous transport missions, hauling mail, rations, clothing, and other supplies from England to bases in France and Germany, and evacuating the Allied wounded.

After V-E Day, transported gasoline to Allied forces in Germany and evacuated prisoners of war to relocation centers in France and the Netherlands. Returned to the US, July–August 1945. Trained with C-46's. Inactivated on 31 July 1946.

=== Cold War ===
Trained with airborne troops after moving to South Carolina in February 1946. Activated in the Reserve in March 1947, but possibly not manned from March 1947 until July 1949, after creation of the 434th Troop Carrier Wing. Called to active duty during the Korean War. Airlifted and exercised with Army paratroops, May 1951 – January 1953. Also provided C-46 combat crew training in support of Far East requirements, September 1952 – January 1953. Remanned in the Reserve in February 1953. Trained, using C-46s as primary training aircraft to January 1957 and C-119s until 1959 when inactivated due to implementation of Tri-Deputate organization by 434th TCW.

=== Refueling operations ===
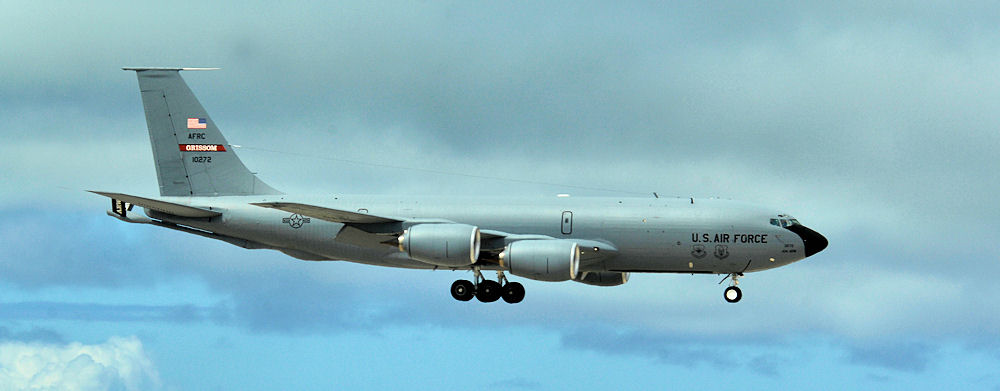
Boeing KC-135R Stratotanker 61-0272 from the 434th Air Refueling Wing lowers its gear as it prepares to land.

Activated as 434th Operations Group when Objective Wing organization implemented by 434th Wing on 1 August 1992. Performed air refueling missions worldwide since August 1992. Deployed personnel and aircraft periodically since late 1993 to Italy and other western European locations in support of NATO operations in the Balkans.

== Lineage ==
- Established as the 434th Troop Carrier Group on 30 January 1943

Activated on 9 February 1943.
Inactivated on 31 July 1946.

- Activated in the Reserve on 15 March 1947

Redesignated 434th Troop Carrier Group, Medium on 1 July 1949
Ordered to Active Service on 1 May 1951
Relieved from Active Duty and inactivated on 1 February 1953

- Activated in the Reserve on 1 February 1953

Inactivated on 14 April 1959
Redesignated: 434th Tactical Fighter Group on 31 July 1985 (Remained inactive)

- Redesignated: 434th Operations Group and activated in the Reserve on 1 August 1992

=== Assignments ===
- I Troop Carrier Command, 9 February 1943
- 50th Troop Carrier Wing, February 1943
- 53d Troop Carrier Wing, 15 April 1943
- IX Troop Carrier Command, 16 October 1943
- 50th Troop Carrier Wing, 18 October 1943
- 53d Troop Carrier Wing, 3 March 1944
- I Troop Carrier Command, July 1945
- 52d Troop Carrier Wing, 4 October 1945
- 50th Troop Carrier Wing, 5 February – 31 July 1946
- Eleventh Air Force, 15 March 1947
- 323d Troop Carrier Wing (later 323d Air Division), 17 October 1947
- 434th Troop Carrier Wing, 1 July 1949 – 1 February 1953
- 434th Troop Carrier Wing, 1 February 1953 – 14 April 1959
- 434th Wing (later 434th Air Refueling Wing), 1 August 1992 – present

=== Components ===
- 71st Troop Carrier Squadron: 9 February 1943 – 31 July 1946; 15 March 1947 – 1 February 1953; 1 February 1953 – 14 April 1959
- 72d Troop Carrier (later, 72d Airlift, 72d Air Refueling) Squadron: 9 February 1943 – 31 July 1946; 1 August 1947 – 1 February 1953; 1 February 1953 – 14 April 1959; 1 August 1992 – present
- 73d Troop Carrier Squadron: 9 February 1943 – 31 July 1946; 1 August 1947 – 1 July 1948; 1 July 1949 – 1 February 1953; 1 February 1953 – 24 March 1954; 8 June 1957 – 14 April 1959
- 74th: Troop Carrier (later, 74th Airlift, 74th Air Refueling) Squadron: 9 February 1943 – 31 July 1946; 15 March 1947 – 2 May 1951; 1 August 1992 – present
- 80th Troop Carrier Squadron: 1 July 1948 – 27 June 1949
- 81st Troop Carrier Squadron: 1 July 1948 – 27 June 1949

=== Stations ===
- Alliance Army Air Field, Nebraska, 9 February 1943
- Baer Field, Indiana, 3 September–October 1943
- RAF Fulbeck (AAF-488), England, 7 October 1943 (air echelon), c. 13 November 1943 (ground echelon)
- RAF Welford (AAF-474), England, November 1943 (air echelon), 10 December 1943 (ground echelon)
- RAF Fulbeck (AAF-488), England, 10 January 1944
- RAF Aldermaston (AAF-467), England, 3 March 1944
- Mourmelon-le-Grand Airfield (A-80), France, March-24 July 1945
- Baer Field, Indiana, 5 August 1945
- Alliance Army Air Field, Nebraska, 15 September 1945
- George Army Airfield, Illinois, 11 October 1945
- Greenville Army Air Base, South Carolina, 2 February – 31 July 1946
- Stout Field, Indiana, 15 March 1947
- Atterbury Air Force Base, Indiana, 1 July 1949
- Lawson Air Force Base, Georgia, 23 January 1952 – 1 February 1953
- Atterbury Air Force Base (later Bakalar Air Force Base), Indiana, 1 February 1953 – 14 April 1959
- Grissom Air Force Base (later Grissom Air Reserve Base), Indiana, 1 August 1992 – present

=== Aircraft ===
- C-47 Skytrain, 1943–1946; 1949
- Airspeed Horsa (Glider), 1944–1945
- Waco CG-4 (Glider), 1944–1945
- C-46 Commando, 1945–1946; 1949–1953; 1953–1957
- C-45 Expeditor, 1953–1957
- C-119 Flying Boxcar, 1957–1959
- KC-135 Stratotanker, 1992–present date
