= 732nd Airlift Squadron =

Unit of the United States Air Force

732nd Airlift Squadron

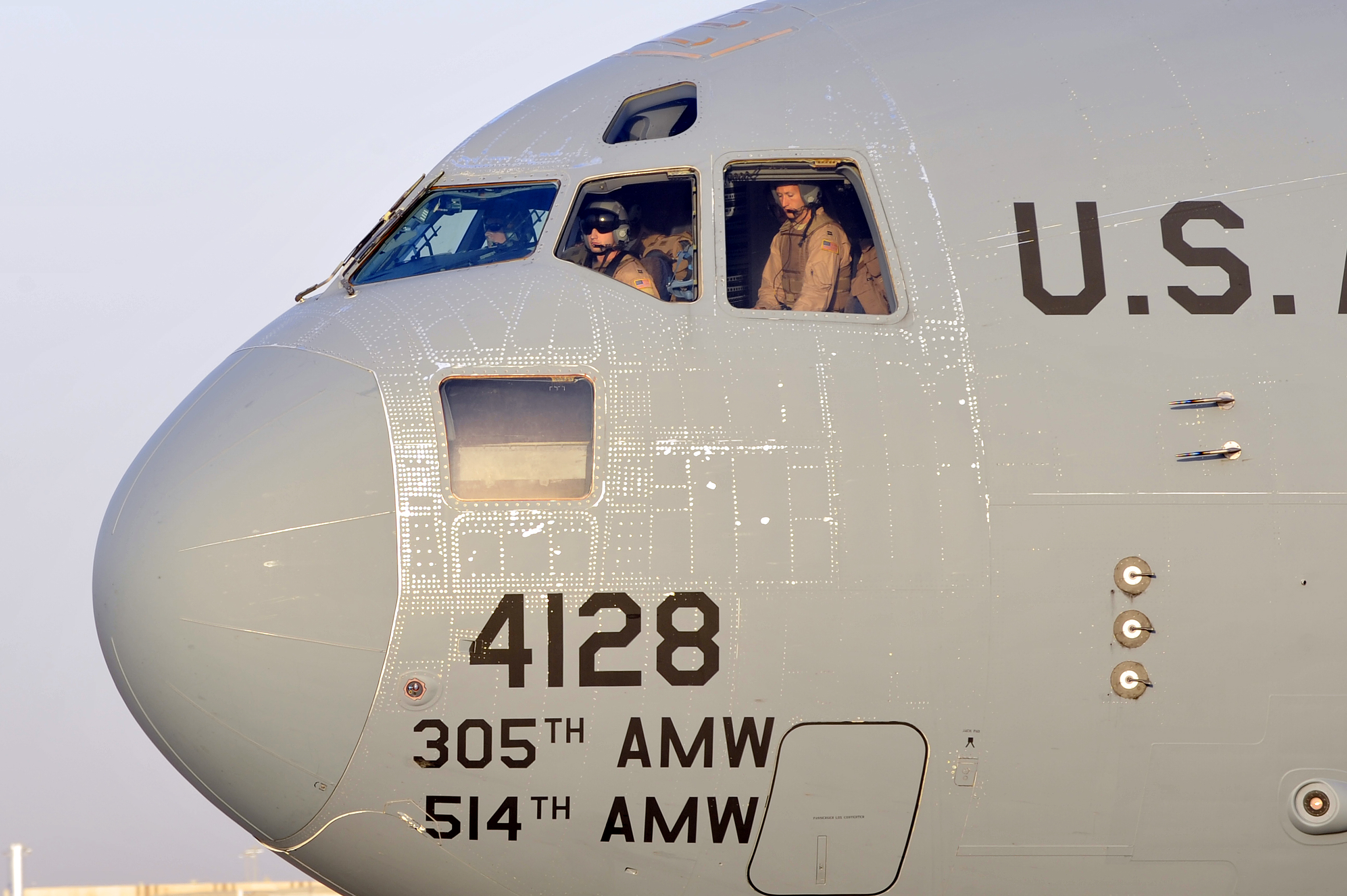
- A squadron C-17 Globemaster III carrying Vice President Joe Biden arrives at Sather Air Base, Iraq
- Active: 1942–1945; 1947–1951; 1952–1966; 1970–present
- Country: United States
- Branch: United States Air Force
- Role: Airlift
- Part of: Air Force Reserve Command
- Garrison/HQ: McGuire Air Force Base
- Motto: Fly With the Ram
- Engagements: European Theater of Operations
- Decorations: Distinguished Unit Citation; Air Force Outstanding Unit Award

Insignia
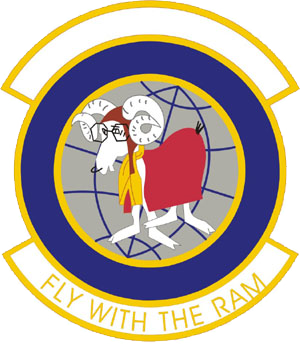
- 732nd Airlift Squadron emblem (Note: Approved 20 April 1976. Description: Azure, on a globe axis bendwise sinister Argent (Silver Gray) gridlined of the first [color] within a bordure Or, a ram caricatured statant Argent resplendent in an early aviator's style scarf Yellow and helm Brown, ringed and wearing eyeglasses Sable attired in a blanket Gules; all within a diminished bordure of the third color. Significance: Blue and Yellow are the Air Force colors. Blue alludes to the sky, the primary theater of Air Force operations. Yellow refers to the sun and the excellence required of Air Force personnel. The ram represents the unit's determination to maintain combat readiness and mobility through worldwide airlift missions, as symbolized by the globe. The spectacles suggest a need for training and professionalism in today's technologically-oriented Air Force. The aviators helmet and scarf are reminiscent of the squadron's flying mission. tradition; and history)

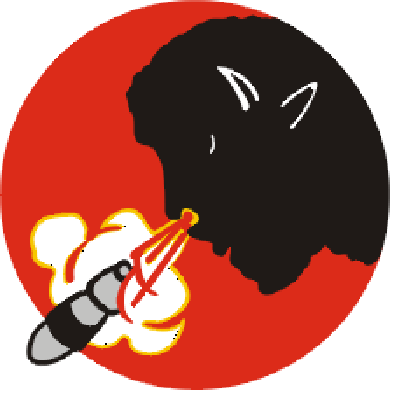
- 332nd Bombardment Squadron emblem (Note: Approved 23 December 1943. Description: On a light red disc, the head of a buffalo in silhouette black and white in sinister chief, blowing a white aerial bomb, outlined and banded black, from the nostrils toward dexter base, in a large white vapor cloud outlined of the first [mentioned color]. Significance: The buffalo is emblematic of the early history of America, symbolizing the spirit of the frontiersmen of that area. Emblazoned on the modern sky wagons of today, the buffalo represents the spirit of the new air frontiersmen and their fight for the freedom of the world.)
- World War II fuselage code: XM

The 732nd Airlift Squadron, officially the 732d Airlift Squadron, is a unit of the United States Air Force. It is part of the 514th Air Mobility Wing at McGuire Air Force Base, New Jersey. It operates McDonnell Douglas C-17 Globemaster III aircraft in providing global strategic airlift to US and allied forces.

The squadron was activated in June 1942 as the 332nd Bombardment Squadron. After training in the United States, the squadron deployed to the European Theater of Operations in the spring of 1943. It participated in the strategic bombing campaign against Germany until V-E Day, earning two Distinguished Unit Citations for its actions. It returned to the United States in December 1945, and was inactivated at the Port of Embarkation.

The squadron was reactivated at Marietta Army Air Field, Georgia in the reserves in 1947, but was not fully manned or equipped until 1949, when it began to receive Douglas B-26 Invaders. It was inactivated on 20 March 1951 after being called to active duty for the Korean War, with its personnel used as "fillers" to bring other units up to strength.

From 1952 to 1955, the unit was designated the 332nd Tactical Reconnaissance Squadron, and, after a brief return to light bomber operations, in 1957 became the 732nd Troop Carrier Squadron, when it absorbed the personnel and equipment of another unit at Grenier Air Force Base, New Hampshire. It was mobilized in 1962 for the Cuban Missile Crisis and provided airlift support for Operation Power Pack before inactivating in 1966.

In 1970, it was reactivated as the 732nd Military Airlift Squadron, operating with the regular Air Force 438th Military Airlift Wing. It has participated in Operation Just Cause and deployed elements Operation Desert Storm. It has flown strategic airlift missions and participated in humanitarian operations.

== Mission ==
The 732nd Airlift Squadron is an associate Air Force Reserve Command unit that flies aircraft assigned to the active-duty 305th Air Mobility Wing, sharing the responsibility of flying the Boeing C-17 Globemaster III. If mobilized the squadron becomes a part of Air Mobility Command.

== History ==
=== World War II ===
==== Initial organization and training ====
The squadron was activated at MacDill Field, Florida, on 15 June 1942 as the 332nd Bombardment Squadron, one of the original squadrons of the 94th Bombardment Group. The AAF had decided to concentrate training of heavy bomber units under Second Air Force, and the squadron moved to Pendleton Field, Oregon, one of that command's bases, two weeks later to begin training with the Boeing B-17 Flying Fortress.

The squadron cadre received its initial training at Pendleton. It moved to different bases for Phase I (individual training) and Phase II (crew training), completing Phase III (unit training) at Pueblo Army Air Base, Colorado. The air echelon of the squadron began ferrying their aircraft to the European Theater of Operations around the first of April 1943. The ground echelon left Pueblo on 18 April for Camp Kilmer, New Jersey and the New York Port of Embarkation on 18 April. They sailed aboard the RMS Queen Elizabeth on 5 May, arriving in Scotland on 13 May.

==== Combat in the European Theater ====
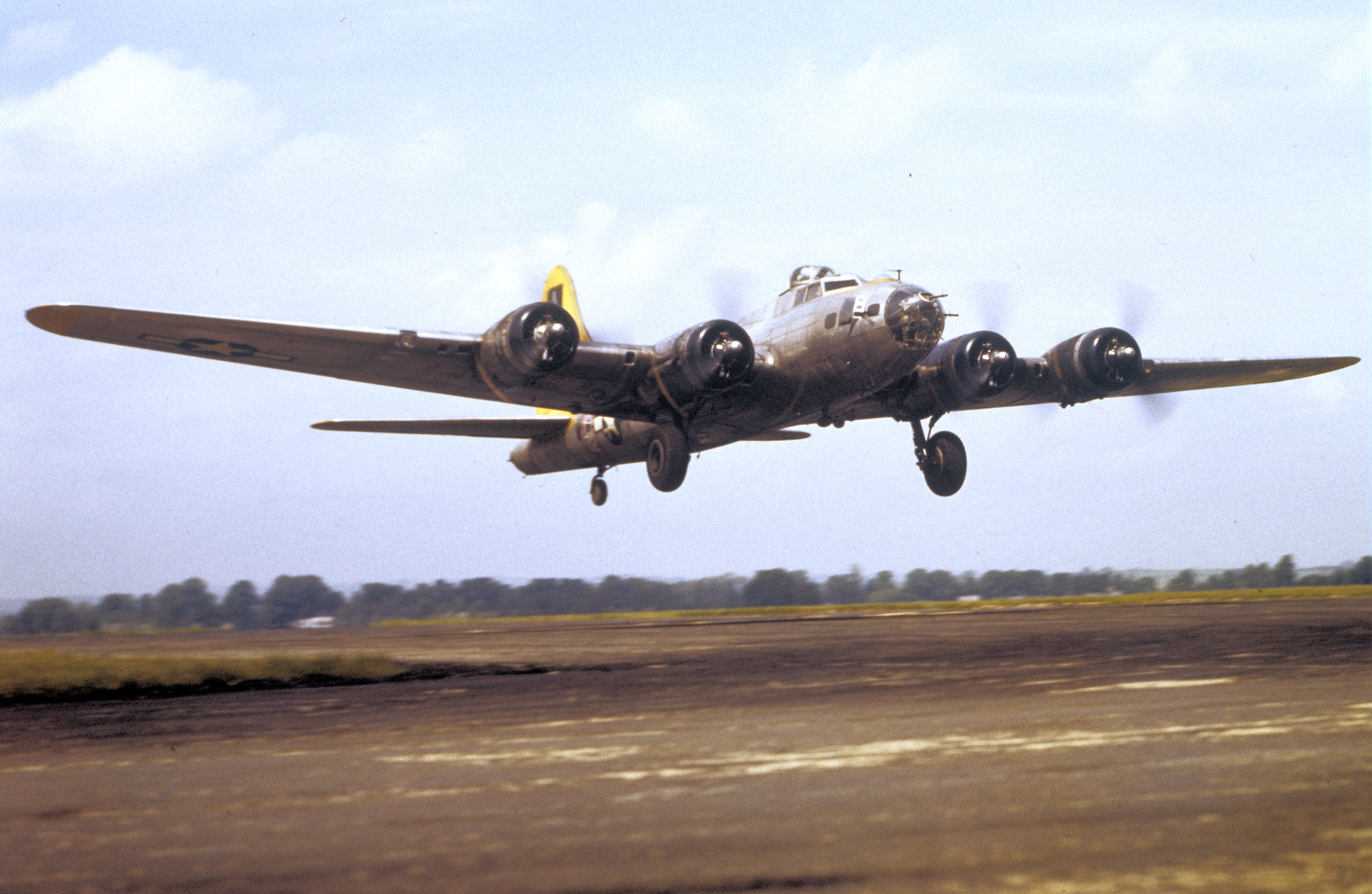
94th Group B-17 taking off from RAF Bury St Edmunds

The squadron began assembling at RAF Earls Colne in mid May, but Eighth Air Force decided to transfer its new Martin B-26 Marauder units from VIII Bomber Command to VIII Air Support Command and concentrate them on bases closer to the European continent. As a result, the 323d Bombardment Group moved to Earls Colne on 14 June, forcing the 94th Group and its squadrons to relocate to RAF Bury St. Edmunds, which would be its combat station for the rest of the war. It flew its first combat mission (and what would be its only mission from Earls Colne) on 13 June against the airfield at Saint-Omer, France. Until the end of the war, the squadron participated in the strategic bombing campaign against Germany. It attacked port facilities at Saint Nazaire, shipyards at Kiel, an aircraft plant at Kassel, oil facilities at Merseburg and ball bearing facilities at Eberhausen.

During an attack on the Messerschmitt factory at Regensberg on 17 August 1943, the squadron was without escort after its escorting Republic P-47 Thunderbolts reached the limit of their range. It withstood repeated attacks, first by enemy Messerschmitt Bf 109 and Focke-Wulf Fw 190 interceptors, then by Messerschmitt Bf 110 and Junkers Ju 88 night fighters, to strike its target, earning its first Distinguished Unit Citation (DUC). This was a "shuttle" mission, with the squadron recovering on bases in north Africa, rather than returning to England.

On 11 January 1944, it attacked a Messerschmitt aircraft parts manufacturing plant at Brunswick/Waggum Airfield. Weather conditions deteriorated during the flight to the target, preventing part of the escorting fighters from reaching the bombers and resulting in the squadron's bombers being recalled. However, the wing leader was unable to authenticate the recall message and continued to the target. In contrast, fair weather to the east of the target permitted the Luftwaffe to concentrate its fighter defenses into one of its largest defensive formations since October 1943. Despite heavy flak in the target area, the squadron bombed accurately and earned its second DUC for this action. The squadron participated in Big Week, the concentrated campaign against the German aircraft manufacturing industry from 20 to 25 February 1944. It bombed transportation, communication and petroleum industrial targets during Operation Lumberjack the final push across the Rhine and into Germany.

The squadron was occasionally diverted from its strategic mission to perform air support and interdiction missions. In the preparation for Operation Overlord, the invasion of Normandy, it flew Operation Crossbow attacks on V-1 flying bomb and V-2 rocket launch sites. On D-Day, it attacked enemy positions near the beachhead. It attacked enemy troops and artillery batteries during Operation Cobra, the breakout at Saint Lo in July 1944, and at Brest, France the following month. It attacked marshalling yards, airfields and strong points near the battlefield during the Battle of the Bulge in late December 1944 through early January 1945.

The squadron flew its last mission on 21 April 1945. Following V-E Day it dropped leaflets to displaced persons and German civilians on what were called "Nickling" flights The squadron was scheduled to be part of the occupation forces, but those plans were cancelled in September 1945. Starting in November, its planes were transferred to other units or flown back to the United States. Its remaining personnel sailed on the SS Lake Champlain on 12 December 1945. Upon reaching the Port of Embarkation, the squadron was inactivated.

=== Reserve operations ===
==== Initial organization and mobilization for the Korean War ====
The squadron was again activated under Air Defense Command (ADC) at Marietta Army Air Field, Georgia in May 1947 as a air reserve unit and was again assigned to the 94th Bombardment Group. At Marietta, it trained under the supervision of the 420th AAF Base Unit (Reserve Training) (later the 2589th AF Reserve Flying Training Center). In 1948 Continental Air Command (ConAC) assumed responsibility for managing reserve and Air National Guard units from ADC.

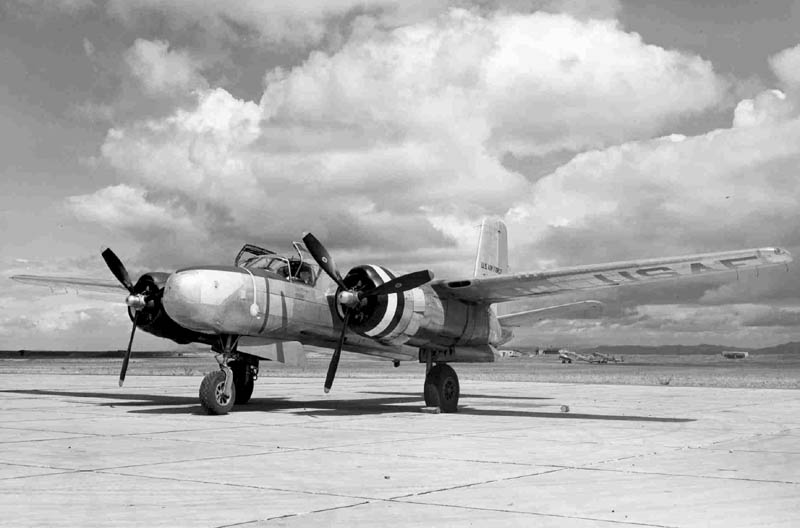
Air reserve B-26

In June 1949, the squadron was redesignated as a light bomber unit. Reserve wings were authorized four operational squadrons, rather than the three of active duty wings. However, the squadrons were manned at 25% of normal strength. The squadron began to equip with the Douglas B-26 Invader, in addition to various trainer aircraft. All reserve combat units were mobilized for the Korean War. The 332nd was called to active duty on 10 March 1951. Its personnel and equipment were used to bring other units up to strength, and the squadron was inactivated ten days later.

==== Reconnaissance operations ====
The squadron was reactivated at Dobbins Air Force Base in June 1952 as the 332nd Tactical Reconnaissance Squadron and equipped with RB-26 Invader photographic reconnaissance aircraft when the 94th Bombardment Wing replaced the 902d Reserve Training Wing at Dobbins. The reserve mobilization for the Korean War had left the reserve without aircraft, and the squadron only began receiving aircraft in July. In addition to its primary aircraft and obsolescent North American P-51 Mustangs, the squadron also operated a variety of trainers and transports.

In the mid-1950s, the Air Force determined that all reserve units should be designed to augment the regular forces in the event of a national emergency. However, there were six reserve flying training wings, including the 8711th Pilot Training Wing at Scott Air Force Base, Illinois, that had no mobilization mission. On 18 May 1955, the 8711th and other reserve training wings were discontinued and replaced by tactical wings. The squadron moved to Scott, where it once again became the 331st Bombardment Squadron and replaced its reconnaissance model B-26s with tactical bomber versions.

==== Troop carrier operations ====
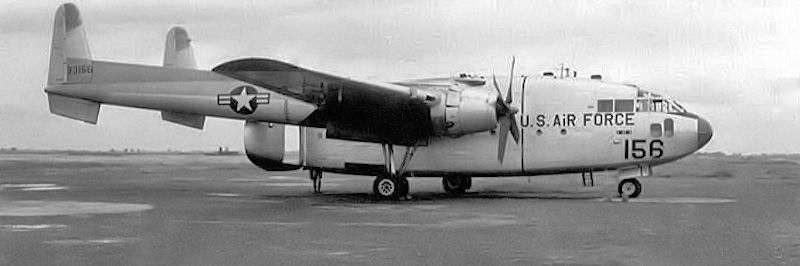
C-119 Flying Boxcar as flown by the squadron

The Joint Chiefs of Staff were pressuring the Air Force to provide more wartime airlift. At the same time, about 150 Fairchild C-119 Flying Boxcars became available from the active force. Consequently, in November 1956 the Air Force directed ConAC to convert three reserve fighter bomber wings to the troop carrier mission by September 1957. In addition, within the Air Staff was a recommendation that the reserve fighter mission given to the Air National Guard and replaced by the troop carrier mission. As a result, the 94th Wing moved to Laurence G. Hanscom Field, Massachusetts, where it replaced the 89th Fighter-Bomber Wing and became a troop carrier organization.

However, during the first half of 1955, the Air Force had begun detaching reserve squadrons from their parent wing locations to separate sites, referred to as the Detached Squadron Concept. The concept offered several advantages: communities were more likely to accept the smaller squadrons than the large wings and the location of separate squadrons in smaller population centers would facilitate recruiting and manning. ConAC’s plan called for placing reserve units at fifty-nine installations located throughout the United States. As part of this plan, the 81st Troop Carrier Squadron had been activated at Grenier Air Force Base, New Hampshire as part of the 436th Troop Carrier Wing, whose headquarters were at Naval Air Station New York. The squadron, now designated the 732nd Troop Carrier Squadron, (Note: The number change was required because a regular 332d Troop Carrier Squadron was active at Sewart Air Force Base, Tennessee. Maurer, Combat Squadrons, pp. 60-62.) did not move to Hanscom with the 94th Wing, but instead assumed the mission, personnel and aircraft of the 81st, which was simultaneously inactivated. Airlift missions were flown regularly, not only in the United states, but from 1959, to overseas destinations. The squadron participated in Operation Swift Lift, transporting high priority cargo for the Air Force. At Grenier, the 732nd initially trained with the 2235th Air Reserve Flying Center, but in March 1959, the center was inactivated, when in place of active duty support for reserve units, ConAC adopted the Air Reserve Technician Program, in which a cadre of the squadron consisted of full time personnel who were simultaneously civilian employees of the Air Force and held rank as members of the reserves.

The squadron was called to active duty for a second time on 28 October 1962 for the Cuban Missile Crisis. It was returned to the reserve on 28 November, (Note: Caldwell dates the return date as 22 November. Caldwell, p. 191. Ravenstein agrees with Maurer a that the date was 28 November. Ravenstein, p. 132.) as tensions eased. Under the Detached Squadron Concept. Mobilizing units was not a problem when the entire wing was called to active service, but mobilizing a single flying squadron and elements to support it proved difficult. This weakness was demonstrated in the partial mobilization of reserve units during the Berlin Crisis of 1961. To resolve this, ConAC determined to reorganize its reserve wings by establishing groups with support elements for each of its troop carrier squadrons at the start of 1962. This reorganization would facilitate mobilization of elements of wings in various combinations when needed. The mobilization of the 94th Wing and its squadrons for the Cuban missile crisis delayed its reorganization until February 1963, when the 902nd Troop Carrier Group was activated as the command element for the squadron, along with support elements for the 732nd.

In April 1965, a military coup d'etat overthrew the elected government of the Dominican Republic. President Johnson directed American forces to its capital, Santo Domingo, to protect American lives and restore order in Operation Power Pack. This operation expanded to an effort not only to restore order, but to establish a government friendly to the United States. The 94th Wing and its squadrons provided airlift support during the crisis, which included not only missions directly supporting the operation, but flights to alleviate airlift shortages within the United States by taking over routes normally flown by Tactical Air Command and Military Air Transport Service transports. Shortly thereafter, in January 1966, the 902nd Group and its elements, including the 732nd were inactivated.

==== Strategic airlift operations ====
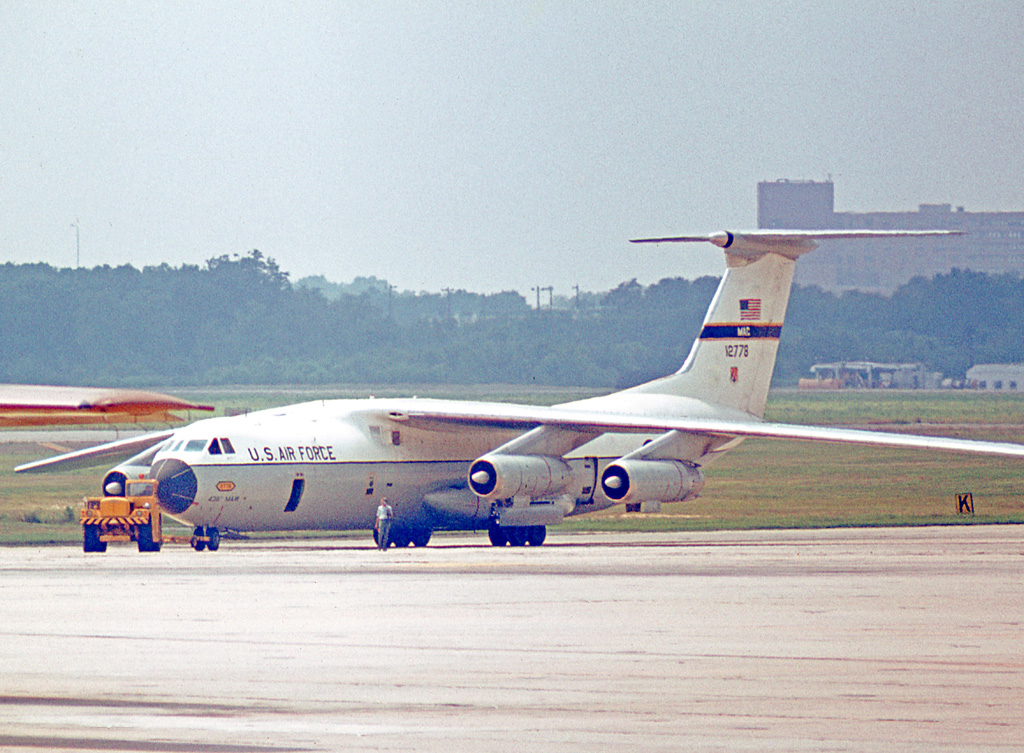
C-141A of the 438th Military Airlift Wing in 1970 (Note: Aircraft is Lockheed C-141A-5-LM Starlifter. It was later modified to C-141B, then to C-141C. Dirkx, Marco (25 July 2023). "1961 USAF Serial Numbers". Joe Baugher’s Serial Number List..)

The squadron was redesignated the 732nd Military Airlift Squadron and activated at McGuire Air Force Base in April 1970. It was assigned to the 903d Military Airlift Group as an associate unit of the active duty 438th Military Airlift Wing. In this program, the squadron flew Lockheed C-141 Starlifters owned by its associated regular unit. With expanded reserve operations at McGuire, in July 1973, the 514th Military Airlift Wing replaced the 903rd Group as the reserve headquarters there. The unit participated in strategic airlift missions and exercises.

In late 1989 the United States initiated Operation Just Cause to oust Manuel Noriega, the head of the government of Panama. Preparing for the assault, the C-141s of Military Airlift Command (MAC) and its associated reserve units prepositioned troops and materiel to bases in the southeastern United States, despite an ice storm which struck Pope Air Force Base, where the troops of the 82nd Airborne Division were located. MAC C-141s flew at low altitude through the gap between Mexico and Cuba to avoid radar detection on their way to Omar Torrijos International Airport, where they would land troops and equipment for the operation.

Between August 1990 and May 1991, squadron crews flew missions supporting Operation Desert Shield and Operation Desert Storm. It flew missions to support Operation Restore Hope, supporting humanitarian efforts in Somalia. In 1995, squadron crews provided support for Operation Uphold Democracy, a United Nations operation to restore civilian rule in Haiti. They also flew supplies to Central America in 1998 to assist in the recovery from Hurricane Mitch.

The unit upgraded to Boeing C-17 Globemaster IIIs in 2004 after retirement of its C-141s. In 2008, it became the first reserve unit to send C-17s to support the rotational airlift mission in Europe, flying from Ramstein Air Base, Germany. The unit participated in relief efforts after the 2010 Haiti earthquakes. It also supports humanitarian organizations by transporting supplies under the Denton Cargo Program.

== Lineage ==
- Constituted 332d Bombardment Squadron (Heavy) on 28 January 1942

Activated on 15 June 1942
Redesignated 332d Bombardment Squadron, Heavy on 20 August 1943
Inactivated on 15 December 1945
Redesignated 332d Bombardment Squadron, Very Heavy on 13 May 1947
Activated in the reserve on 29 May 1947
Redesignated 332d Bombardment Squadron, Light on 26 June 1949
Ordered to active service on 10 March 1951
Inactivated on 20 March 1951
Redesignated 332d Tactical Reconnaissance Squadron on 26 May 1952
Activated in the reserve on 14 June 1952
Redesignated: 332d Bombardment Squadron, Tactical on 18 May 1955
Redesignated: 732d Troop Carrier Squadron, Medium on 1 July 1957
Ordered to active service on 28 October 1962
Relieved from active duty on 28 November 1962
Discontinued, and inactivated, on 25 January 1966
Redesignated 732d Military Airlift Squadron (Associate) on 19 March 1970
Activated on 1 April 1970
Redesignated: 732d Airlift Squadron (Associate) on 1 February 1992
Redesignated: 732d Airlift Squadron on 1 October 1994

=== Assignments ===
- 94th Bombardment Group, 15 June 1942 – 29 November 1945
- 94th Bombardment Group, 29 May 1947 – 20 March 1951
- 94th Tactical Reconnaissance Group (later 94th Bombardment Group, 94th Troop Carrier Group), 14 June 1952
- 94th Troop Carrier Wing, 14 April 1959
- 902nd Troop Carrier Group, 11 February 1963 – 25 January 1966
- 903rd Military Airlift Group, 1 April 1970
- 514th Military Airlift Wing (later 514th Airlift Wing), 1 July 1973
- 514th Operations Group, 1 August 1992 – present

=== Stations ===
- MacDill Field, Florida, 15 June 1942
- Pendleton Field, Oregon, 29 June 1942
- Davis-Monthan Field, Arizona, 29 August 1942
- Biggs Field, Texas, 1 November 1942
- Pueblo Army Air Base, Colorado, 3 January-17 April 1943
- RAF Earls Colne (AAF-358), England, 11 May 1943
- RAF Bury St. Edmunds (AAF-468), England, c. 13 June 1943 – 22 November 1945
- Camp Kilmer, New Jersey, c. 27–29 November 1945
- Marietta Army Air Field (later Marietta Air Force Base, Dobbins Air Force Base), Georgia, 29 May 1947 – 20 March 1951
- Dobbins Air Force Base, Georgia, 14 June 1952
- Scott Air Force Base, Illinois, 18 May 1955
- Grenier Air Force Base, New Hampshire, 16 November 1957 – 25 January 1966
- McGuire Air Force Base (later part of Joint Base McGuire-Dix-Lakehurst), New Jersey, 1 April 1970 – present

=== Aircraft ===
- Boeing B-17 Flying Fortress (1942–1945)
- Douglas B-26 Invader (1949-1951)
- Fairchild C-119 Flying Boxcar (1959–1965)
- Lockheed C-141 Starlifter (1970–2004)
- McDonnell Douglas C-17 Globemaster III (2004–present)

=== Awards and campaigns ===
Award streamer	Award	Dates	Notes
	Distinguished Unit Citation	17 August 1943	332nd Bombardment Squadron, Germany
	Distinguished Unit Citation	11 January 1944	332nd Bombardment Squadron, Germany
	Air Force Outstanding Unit Award	1 July 1973-31 January 1975	732nd Military Airlift Squadron
	Air Force Outstanding Unit Award	1 August 1977-31 December 1978	732nd Military Airlift Squadron
	Air Force Outstanding Unit Award	1 August 1988-31 July 1990	732nd Military Airlift Squadron
	Air Force Outstanding Unit Award	1 August 1990-31 July 1992	732nd Military Airlift Squadron (later 732nd Airlift Squadron)
	Air Force Outstanding Unit Award	1 October 1995-30 September 1997	732nd Airlift Squadron
	Air Force Outstanding Unit Award	1 October 1997-30 September 1998	732nd Airlift Squadron
	Air Force Outstanding Unit Award	1 October 1999-30 September 2000	732nd Airlift Squadron
	Air Force Outstanding Unit Award	1 August 2005-31 August 2007	732nd Airlift Squadron

Campaign Streamer	Campaign	Dates	Notes
	Air Offensive, Europe	11 May 1943–5 June 1944	332nd Bombardment Squadron
	Air Combat, EAME Theater	11 May 1943–11 May 1945	332nd Bombardment Squadron
	Normandy	6 June 1944–24 July 1944	332nd Bombardment Squadron
	Central Europe	22 March 1944–21 May 1945	332nd Bombardment Squadron
	Northern France	25 July 1944–14 September 1944	331st Bombardment Squadron
	Rhineland	15 September 1944–21 March 1945	332nd Bombardment Squadron
	Ardennes-Alsace	16 December 1944–25 January 1945	332nd Bombardment Squadron
	Just Cause	20 December 1989–31 January 1990	732nd Military Airlift Squadron, Panama

== See also ==
- B-17 Flying Fortress units of the United States Army Air Forces
- List of A-26 Invader operators
- List of United States Air Force airlift squadrons
