= 902d Troop Carrier Group =

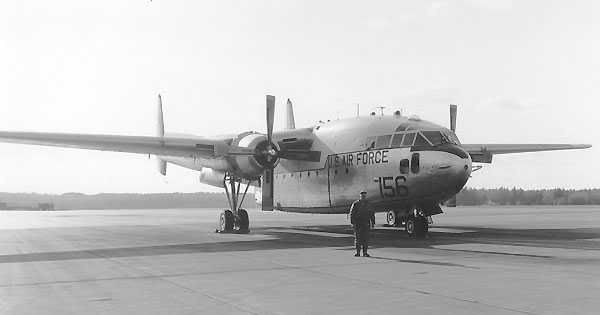
- Group C-119 Flying Boxcar (Note: Aircraft is Kaiser-Frazer built Fairchild C-119F-KM Flying Boxcar serial 51-8156.)
- Active: 1963-1966
- Country: United States
- Branch: United States Air Force
- Role: Airlift

The 902d Troop Carrier Group is an inactive United States Air Force Reserve unit. It was last active with the 94th Troop Carrier Wing at Grenier Air Force Base, Massachusetts, where it was inactivated on 25 January 1966.

== History ==
=== Need for reserve troop carrier groups ===
During the first half of 1955, the Air Force began detaching Air Force Reserve squadrons from their parent wing locations to separate sites. The concept offered several advantages. Communities were more likely to accept the smaller squadrons than the large wings and the location of separate squadrons in smaller population centers would facilitate recruiting and manning. Continental Air Command (ConAC)'s plan called for placing Air Force Reserve units at fifty-nine installations located throughout the United States. When these relocations were completed in 1959, reserve wing headquarters and wing support elements would typically be on one base, along with one (or in some cases two) of the wing's flying squadrons, while the remaining flying squadrons were spread over thirty-five Air Force, Navy and civilian airfields under what was called the Detached Squadron Concept.

Although this dispersal was not a problem when the entire wing was called to active service, mobilizing a single flying squadron and elements to support it proved difficult. This weakness was demonstrated in the partial mobilization of reserve units during the Berlin Crisis of 1961 To resolve this, at the start of 1962, Continental Air Command, (ConAC) determined to reorganize its reserve wings by establishing groups with support elements for each of its troop carrier squadrons. This reorganization would facilitate mobilization of elements of wings in various combinations when needed. However, as this plan was entering its implementation phase, another partial mobilization occurred for the Cuban Missile Crisis, with the units being released on 22 November 1962. The formation of troop carrier groups occurred in January 1963 for units that had not been mobilized, but was delayed until February for those that had been.

=== Activation of 902d Troop Carrier Group ===
As a result, the 902d Troop Carrier Group was established at Grenier Air Force Base, New Hampshire on 11 February 1963, as the headquarters for the 732d Troop Carrier Squadron, which had been stationed there since November 1957, when it replaced the 81st Troop Carrier Squadron. Along with group headquarters, a combat support squadron, materiel Squadron and a tactical dispensary were organized to support the 732d.

The group mission was to organize, recruit and train Air Force Reserve personnel in the tactical airlift of airborne forces, their equipment and supplies and delivery of these forces and materials by airdrop, landing or cargo extraction systems. The group was equipped with C-119 Flying Boxcars for Tactical Air Command airlift operations.

The 902d was one of two Fairchild C-119 Flying Boxcar groups assigned to the 94th Wing in 1963, the other being the 901st Troop Carrier Group at Hanscom Field, Massachusetts.

Inactivated in January 1966 with the end of reserve flyiing operations at Grenier Air Force Base.

== Lineage ==
- Established as the 902d Troop Carrier Group, Medium and activated on 15 January 1963 (not organized)

Organized in the Reserve on 11 February 1963
Inactivated on 25 January 1966

- Redesignated 902d Military Airlift Group on 31 July 1985

=== Assignments ===
- Continental Air Command, 15 January 1963 (not organized)
- 94th Troop Carrier Wing, 11 February 1963 – 25 January 1966

=== Components ===
- 732d Troop Carrier Squadron, 11 February 1963 – 25 January 1966
- 902d Tactical Dispensary, 11 February 1963 – 25 January 1966
- 902d Combat Support Squadron, 11 February 1963 – 25 January 1966
- 902d Materiel Squadron, 11 February 1963 – 25 January 1966
- 902d Aerial Port Flight, 15 February 1964 – 25 January 1966

=== Stations ===
- Grenier Air Force Base, New Hampshire, 11 February 1963 – 25 January 1966

=== Aircraft ===
- Fairchild C-119 Flying Boxcar, 1963-1966
