= 931st Air Refueling Wing =

US Air Force unit

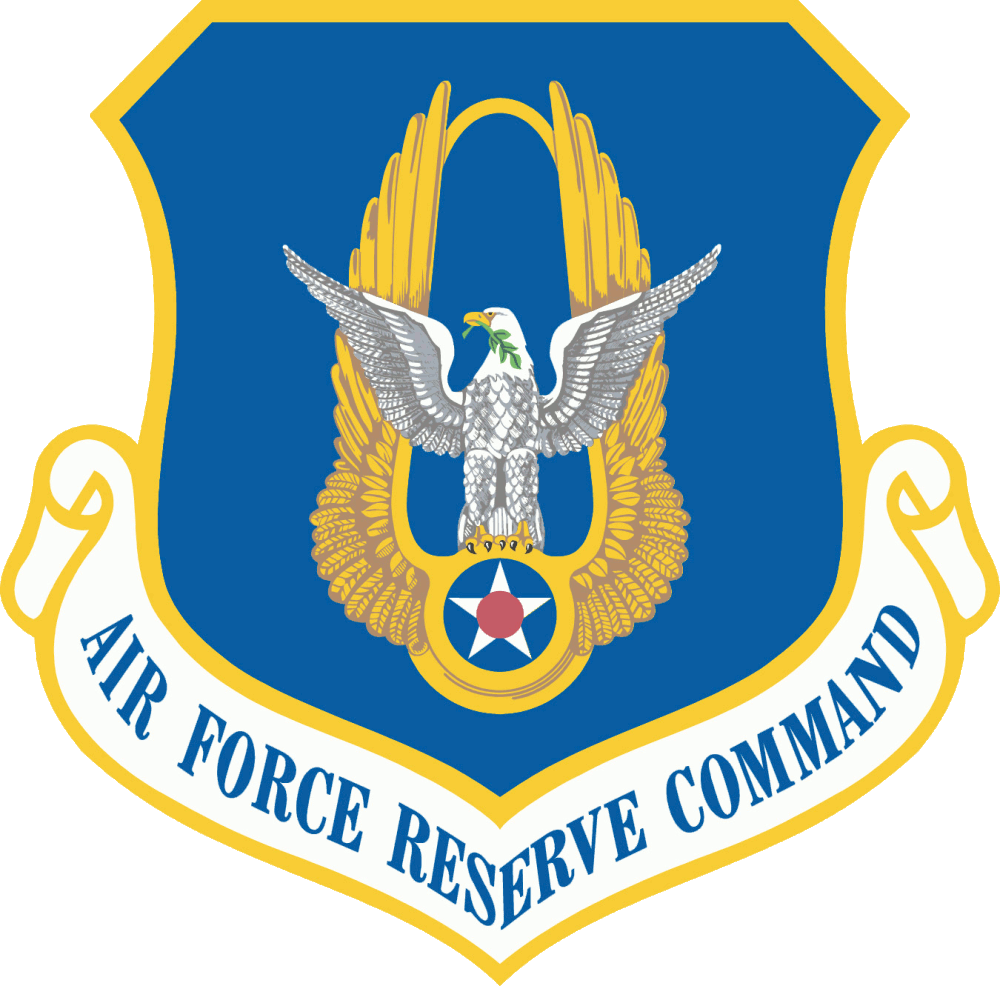
931st Air Refueling Wing

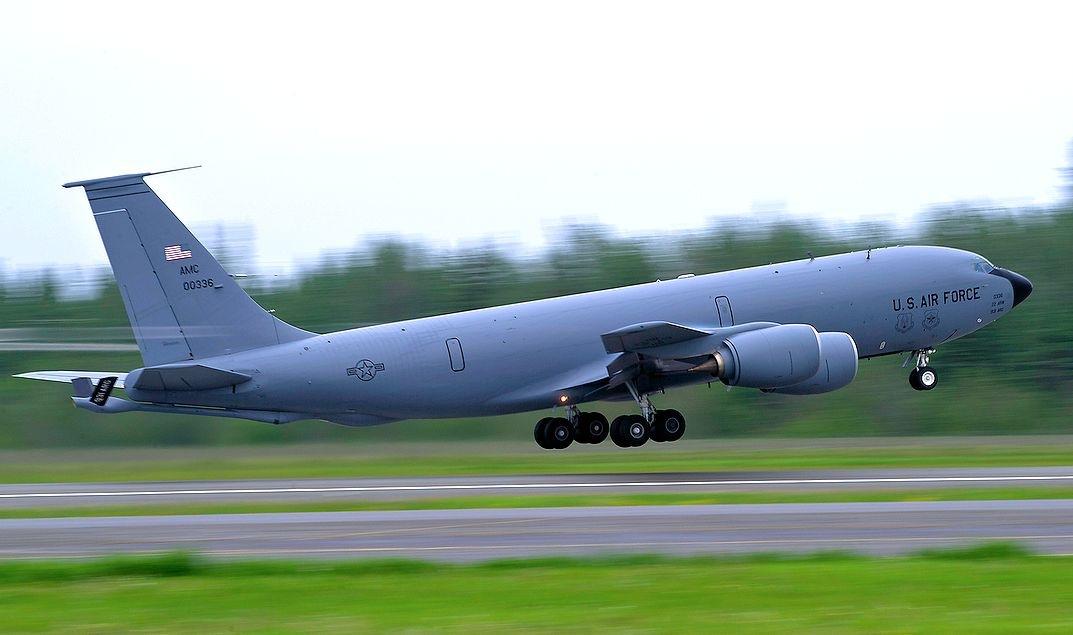
- 931st Air Refueling Wing Boeing KC-135R Stratotanker
- Active: 1963–1975; 1978–1987; 1995–present
- Country: United States
- Branch: United States Air Force
- Type: Wing
- Role: Aerial refueling
- Part of: Air Force Reserve Command
- Garrison/HQ: McConnell Air Force Base, Kansas
- Decorations: Air Force Meritorious Unit Award; Air Force Outstanding Unit Award; Republic of Vietnam Gallantry Cross with Palm
- Website: https://www.931arw.afrc.af.mil/

Insignia
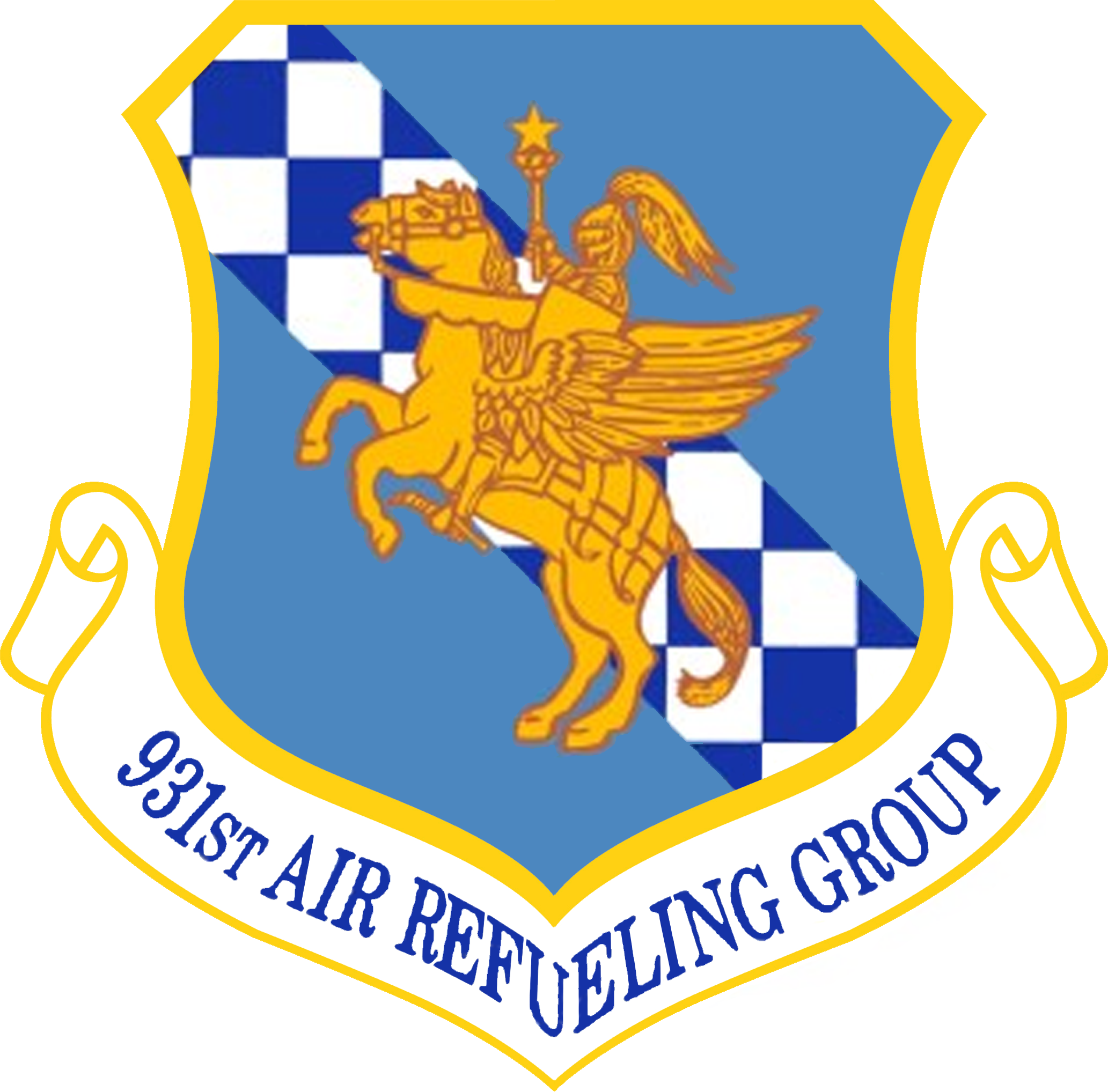
- 931st Air Refueling Wing emblem (Note: Approved 5 April 1979.)

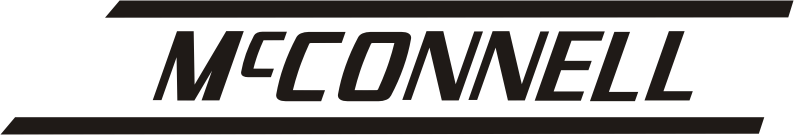
- Tail stripe

Aircraft flown
- Tanker: KC-135 Stratotanker KC-46 Pegasus

The 931st Air Refueling Wing is an Air Reserve Component of the United States Air Force. It is assigned to the Fourth Air Force, Air Force Reserve Command, stationed at McConnell Air Force Base, Kansas.

The 931st is an associate unit with the 22d Air Refueling Wing, Air Mobility Command (AMC) and if mobilized the wing is gained by AMC.

The 931st ARW is an associate unit with the active-duty 22d Air Refueling Wing and currently has about 485 personnel. The host unit and the 931st ARW share responsibilities for maintenance, with flying operations conducted by both units, using the inventory of 24 KC-135R Stratotankers and Boeing KC-46 Pegasus.

== Units ==
The wing consists of the following units:

931st Operations Group

- 18th Air Refueling Squadron
- 905th Air Refueling Squadron
- 924th Air Refueling Squadron
- 931st Operations Support Squadron

931st Maintenance Group

- 931st Aircraft Maintenance Squadron
- 931st Maintenance Squadron
- 931st Maintenance Operations Flight

931st Mission Support Group

- 931st Civil Engineer Squadron
- 931st Force Support Squadron
- 931st Security Forces Squadron

- 931st Aerospace Medicine Squadron

== History ==
=== Need for reserve troop carrier groups ===
After May 1959, the reserve flying force consisted of 45 troop carrier squadrons assigned to 15 troop carrier wings. (Note: There were an additional four rescue squadrons not assigned to the wings. Cantwell, p. 156.) The squadrons were not all located with their parent wings, but were spread over thirty-five Air Force, Navy and civilian airfields under what was called the Detached Squadron Concept. The concept offered several advantages. Communities were more likely to accept the smaller squadrons than the large wings and the location of separate squadrons in smaller population centers would facilitate recruiting and manning. However, under this concept, all support organizations were located with the wing headquarters. Although this was not a problem when the entire wing was called to active service, mobilizing a single flying squadron and elements to support it proved difficult. This weakness was demonstrated in the partial mobilization of reserve units during the Berlin Crisis of 1961. To resolve this, at the start of 1962, Continental Air Command, (ConAC) determined to reorganize its reserve wings by establishing groups with support elements for each of its troop carrier squadrons. This reorganization would facilitate mobilization of elements of wings in various combinations when needed.

=== Activation of the 931st Troop Carrier Group ===
As a result, the 931st Troop Carrier Group was activated at Atterbury Air Force Base, Indiana on 11 February 1963 as the headquarters for the 72d Troop Carrier Squadron, which had been stationed there since February 1953. Along with group headquarters, a Combat Support Squadron, Materiel Squadron and a Tactical Infirmary were organized to support the 72d.

If mobilized, the group was gained by Tactical Air Command (TAC), which was also responsible for its training. Its mission was to organize, recruit and train Air Force reservists with Fairchild C-119 Flying Boxcars in the tactical airlift of airborne forces, their equipment and supplies and delivery of these forces and materials by airdrop, landing or cargo extraction systems.

The group was one of three C-119 groups assigned to the 434th Troop Carrier Wing in 1963, the others being the 930th Troop Carrier Group, also at Atterbury and the 932d Troop Carrier Group at Scott Air Force Base, Illinois.

=== Tactical Air Support/Special Operations ===
The 931st performed routine reserve airlift operations until July 1969 when the Flying Boxcars were retired, and the unit was redesignated as a Tactical Air Support unit. The 72d became the 72d Tactical Air Support Squadron and was re-equipped with Cessna U-3 Blue Canoe and Cessna O-2 Skymaster observation and close air support aircraft.

On 31 December 1969, in connection with the closing of Bakalar, the group and its squadron moved to Grissom Air Force Base, Indiana. First reassigned to the 403d Composite Wing on 1 June 1970 and then on 15 January 1971 to the 434th Special Operations Wing, on 1 March 1971, group and squadron converted to Cessna A-37B Dragonfly counter-insurgency aircraft being returned from South Vietnam. The A-37s were primarily an export aircraft used for foreign military sales and the unit trained personnel from other Air Force Reserve squadrons and Latin American Air Forces in the use of the aircraft.

The 72d was inactivated on 1 October 1973 and replaced by the 46th Tactical Fighter Squadron in a reorganization. The 46th was assigned directly to the 434th Tactical Fighter Wing and the 931st was inactivated on 1 July 1975.

=== Air Refueling ===
In May 1977 the group became a Strategic Air Command (SAC) Boeing KC-135 Stratotanker air refueling unit, and activated at Grissom as part of the 452d Air Refueling Wing. The 931st was the third Air Force Reserve unit formed to provide air refueling support for SAC.

On 1 October 1978, the "Flying Hoosiers" achieved operational status 72 days ahead of schedule. That was the shortest time period ever recorded for an air refueling unit from activation to combat readiness. In the ensuing years, the 931st established more records of achievement including the Carl Spaatz Memorial Trophy, the Rousher Memorial Trophy for two consecutive years, the Golden Tanker Trophy and the Air Force Outstanding Unit Award. The unit flew the KC-135 from 1978 until its inactivation in 1987.

Reactivated in 1995 under Air Mobility Command at McConnell Air Force Base, Kansas. This activation brought with it the unique distinction of being the first associate tanker unit in the Air Force. The 931st began flying operations in May 1995, refueling the B-2 Spirit christened "Spirit of Kansas". With the activation, the 18th Air Refueling Squadron provided air operations for the group.

The 18th was redesignated a "super squadron" on 1 October 1997, doubling its size to 32 flying crews. The 931st was awarded the Air Force Outstanding Unit Award for meritorious service from 1 November 1995 to 31 October 1997. The 931st also won the Kansas Award for Excellence on 21 October 1997, becoming the first military unit to win this quality award. And, in recognition of meritorious service, the 931st received its third Air Force Outstanding Unit Award, for its performance between 1 November 1997, and 31 October 1999.

From April to July 1999, more than 70 members of the 931st were activated under a Presidential Selected Reserve Call-Up. In support of Operation Allied Force, members deployed to Morón Air Base, Spain and Naval Air Facility Souda Bay, Crete. In support of Operation Northern Watch, members deployed to Incirlik Air Base, Turkey.

In March 2003, more than 100 members of the 931st were mobilized in support of Operation Iraqi Freedom. Most of the mobilized individuals were KC-135 aircrew members.

During Operation Iraqi Freedom, the Unit's security forces deployed a team to Kirkuk Air Base, Iraq (Forward Operating Base Warrior). This was the first "boots on the ground" combat mission since the unit's stand-up. The security forces team was integrated with various active-duty units, which formed the 506th Expeditionary Security Forces Squadron. The squadron was tasked with providing base perimeter security, entry-control and exterior/interior mobile patrols.

Members of the 931st have participated in a number of operations, including:

Operation Desert Fox, Phoenix Scorpion II, Operation Southern Watch, JTF-6, Silver Flag, Iceland Tanker Task Force, Geilenkirchen Tanker Task Force, Trailblazer 97, Joint Forge, Phoenix Duke, Deny Flight, Deliberate Guard, Operation Northern Watch, Operation Allied Force, Operation Noble Eagle, Operation Enduring Freedom and Operation Iraqi Freedom.

== Lineage ==
- Established as the 931st Troop Carrier Group, Medium and activated on 15 January 1963 (not organized)

Organized in the reserve on 11 February 1963
Redesignated 931st Tactical Airlift Group on 1 July 1967
Redesignated 931st Tactical Air Support Group on 25 June 1969
Redesignated 931st Special Operations Group on 1 March 1971
Redesignated 931st Tactical Fighter Group on 1 October 1973
Inactivated on 1 July 1975

- Redesignated 931st Air Refueling Group, Heavy on 18 May 1977

Activated in the Reserve on 1 July 1978
Inactivated on 1 July 1987

- Redesignated 931st Air Refueling Group on 9 September 1994

Activated in the Reserve on 1 January 1995

- Redesignated 931st Air Refueling Wing on 1 May 2016

=== Assignments ===
- Continental Air Command, 15 January 1963 (not organized)
- 434th Troop Carrier Wing (later 434th Tactical Airlift Wing), 11 February 1963
- Eastern Air Force Reserve Region, 31 December 1969
- 403d Composite Wing, 1 June 1970
- 434th Special Operations Wing (later 434th Tactical Fighter Wing), 15 January 1971 – 1 July 1975
- 452d Air Refueling Wing, 1 July 1978 – 1 July 1987
- Fourth Air Force, 1 January 1995
- 507th Air Refueling Wing, 1 March 1999
- Fourth Air Force, 1 October 2008 – present

=== Components ===
- 18th Air Refueling Squadron: 1 October 1995 – present
- 46th Tactical Fighter Squadron: 1 October 1973 – 1 July 1975
- 72d Troop Carrier Squadron (later 72d Tactical Airlift Squadron, 72d Tactical Air Support Squadron, 72d Tactical Fighter Squadron, 72d Air Refueling Squadron): 11 February 1963 – 1 October 1973, 1 July 1978 – 1 July 1987.

=== Stations ===
- Atterbury Air Force Base (later Bakalar Air Force Base), Indiana, 11 February 1963
- Grissom Air Force Base Indiana, 15 January 1970 – 1 July 1975
- Grissom Air Force Base, Indiana, 1 July 1978 – 1 July 1987
- McConnell Air Force Base, Kansas, 1 January 1995 – present

=== Aircraft ===
- Fairchild C-119 Flying Boxcar, 1963–1969
- Cessna U-3 Blue Canoe, 1969–1971
- Cessna O-2 Skymaster, 1969–1971
- Cessna A-37B Dragonfly, 1971–1975
- Boeing KC-135 Stratotanker, 1978–1987; 1995–present
- Boeing KC-46 Pegasus, 2019-present
