= RAF Fulbeck =

Airport in Lincolnshire, England

RAF Fulbeck USAAF Station AAF-488
- Fulbeck, Lincolnshire in England
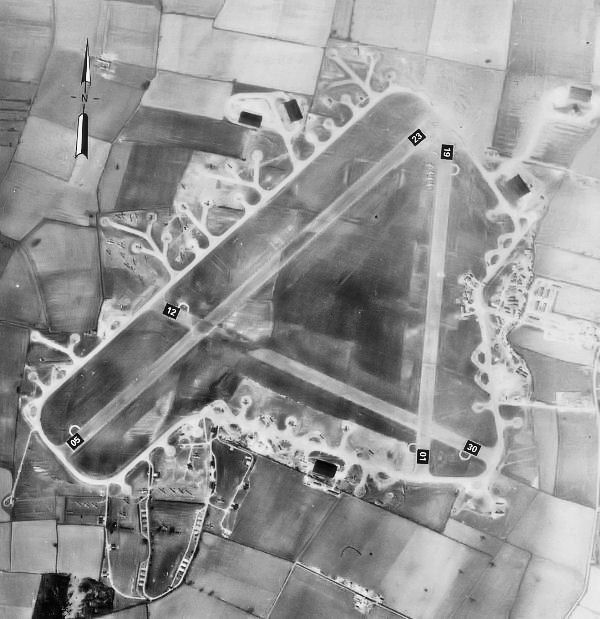
- RAF Fulbeck during World War II, 18 April 1944. About six weeks before D-Day, dozens of gliders are dispersed around the airfield.

Site information
- Type: Royal Air Force station
- Code: FK
- Owner: Ministry of Defence
- Operator: Royal Air Force; United States Army Air Forces
- Controlled by: RAF Bomber Command * No. 5 Group RAF; Ninth Air Force

Location
- Shown within Lincolnshire RAF Fulbeck (the United Kingdom)
- Coordinates: 53°02′57″N 000°39′32″W

Site history
- Built: 1940
- In use: 1940 - 1970
- Battles/wars: European theatre of World War II

Airfield information
- Elevation: 12 metres (39 ft) AMSL
Runways
Direction	Length and surface
01/19	Asphalt
05/23	Asphalt
12/30	Asphalt

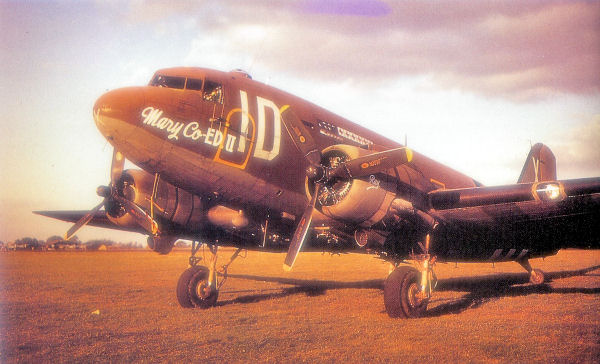
Douglas C-47A Skytrain of the 74th TCS/434th TCG at Fulbeck.

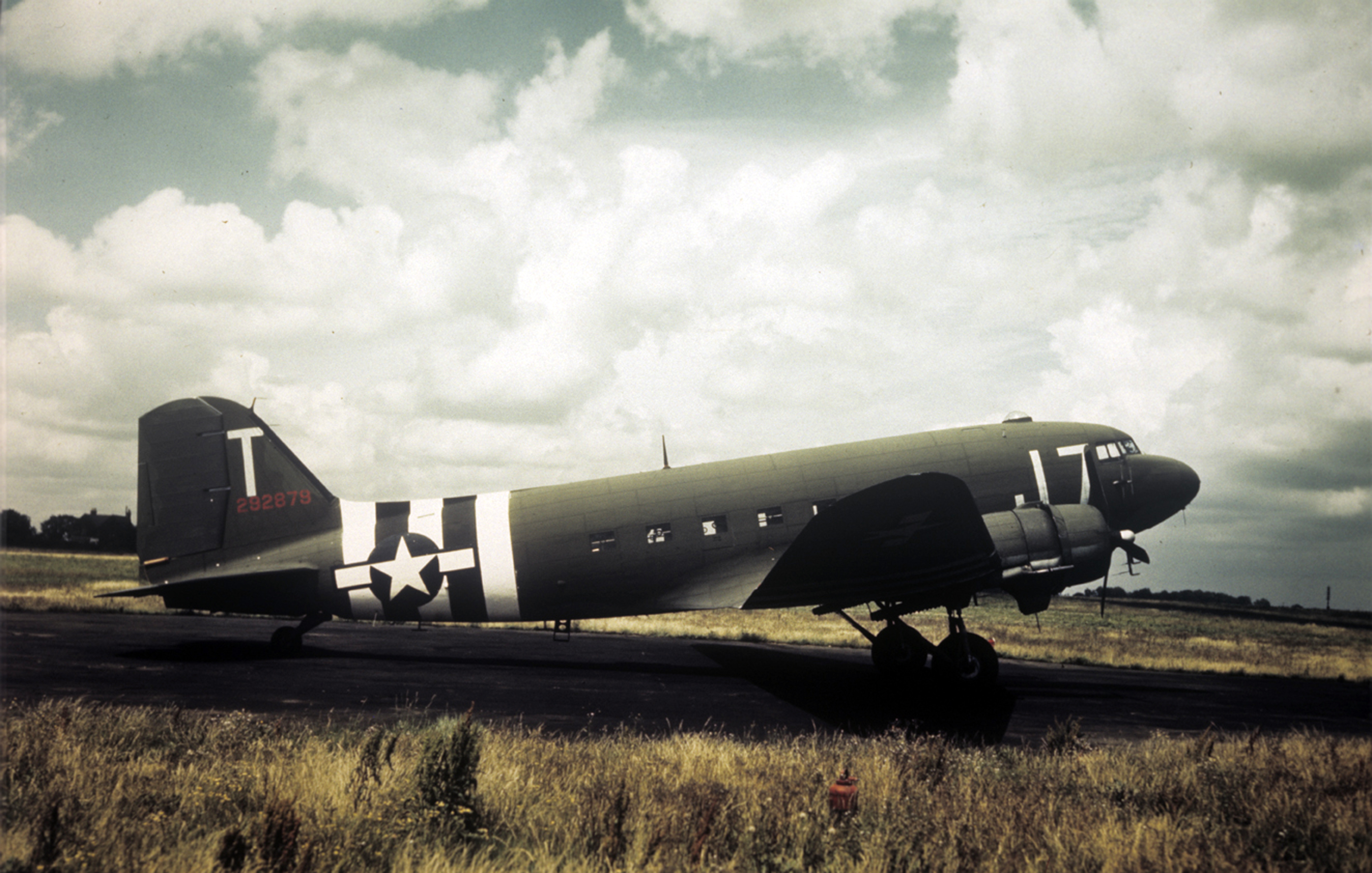
Douglas C-47A-15-DK Skytrain Serial 42-92879 of the 303d TCS/442d TCG at Fulbeck in Normandy invasion markings.

Royal Air Force Fulbeck or more simply RAF Fulbeck is a former Royal Air Force station located 6.3 miles (10.1 km) east of Newark-on-Trent, Nottinghamshire and 10.9 miles (17.5 km) west of Sleaford, Lincolnshire, England.

The airfield is located about 106 miles (171 km) north-northwest of London and was opened in 1940 when it was used by both the Royal Air Force and United States Army Air Forces. During the war it was used primarily as troop carrier airfield for airborne units. After the war it was closed in 1948.

== History ==
The airfield was initially used by the Royal Air Force as a satellite of RAF Syerston from 1940 until October 1943.

=== USAAF use ===
It was known as USAAF Station AAF-488 for security reasons by the USAAF during the war, and by which it was referred to instead of location. Its USAAF Station Code was "FB".

==== 434th Troop Carrier Group ====
In October 1943, the 434th Troop Carrier Group arrived at Fulbeck from Baer AAF, Indiana. The group was assigned to the 53d Troop Carrier Wing and flew Douglas C-47/C-53 Skytrains. Operational squadrons of the 434th and fuselage codes were:

- 71st Troop Carrier (CJ)
- 72d Troop Carrier (CU)
- 73d Troop Carrier (CN)
- 74th Troop Carrier (ID)

The 434th TCG had 56 C-47s and started training with some detachments elsewhere until finally moving to RAF Welford on 10 December 1943.

==== 442d Troop Carrier Group ====
At the end of March 1944 the 442d Troop Carrier Group arrived at Fulbeck from Baer AAF, Indiana. The group was assigned to the 50th Troop Carrier Wing and flew Douglas C-47/C-53 Skytrains. Operational squadrons of the 442d and fuselage codes were:

- 303d Troop Carrier (J7)
- 304th Troop Carrier (V4)
- 305th Troop Carrier (4J)
- 306th Troop Carrier (7H)

The 442d TCG moved to RAF Weston Zoyland in mid-June after having taken part in the D-Day operations.

==== 440th Troop Carrier Group ====
During the following two months there was little activity at Fulbeck until some C-47s of the 440th Troop Carrier Group arrived in September 1944 from RAF Exeter to use Fulbeck as part of Operation Market, the air component of Operation Market-Garden.

=== RAF Bomber Command use ===
The IX Troop Carrier Command relinquished the airfield back to the RAF in late September and No. 5 Group Bomber Command moved in the distinguished No. 49 Squadron from Fiskerton, an airfield which was transferred to No. 1 Group the following month.

On 2 November the recently formed No. 189 Squadron arrived from Bardney having taken part in its first operation the previous day. Both Nos. 49 and 189 Squadron's Lancasters remained based at Fulbeck until April 1945. No. 49 flew some 60 raids from the airfield losing 15 aircraft and No. 189 took part in 40 raids with 16 aircraft lost. No. 189 moved back to Bardney on the 8th of the month and No. 49 moved to Syerston on the 22nd. On the morning of transfer, a No. 49 Squadron Lancaster making a low farewell pass across the airfield crashed into the technical area and of the resulting 24 casualties among air and ground personnel, 15 were fatal.

Bomber Command operations from Fulbeck cost 38 Lancasters, either failing to return or destroyed in crashes.

== 1945 Avro Lancaster Crash ==
on the 22 April 1945 a Royal Air Force, Avro Lancaster Mk III (PB463) of the 49 Squadron had taken off from the base bound for RAF Syerston. Shortly after lifting off the aircraft caught fire & crashed into a depot. All six crew & fifteen on the ground died.

== Units ==
The following units were also here at some point:

- No. 2 Central Flying School RAF
- No. 2 Flying Instructors School RAF
- No. 2 Flying Training School RAF
- No. 5 Group Aircrew School RAF
- No. 11 Service Flying Training School RAF
- No. 29 Heavy Glider Maintenance Section
- No. 255 Maintenance Unit RAF
- No. 1485 (Bomber) Gunnery Flight RAF
- No. 1485 (Bombing) Gunnery Flight RAF
- No. 1506 (Beam Approach Training) Flight RAF
- Air Bomber Training Flight (No. 5 Group)
- Air Gun Laying (Turret) Training Unit RAF
- Bomber Command Film Flight Unit RAF
- RAF College
- RAF College Service Flying Training School RAF

== Current use ==
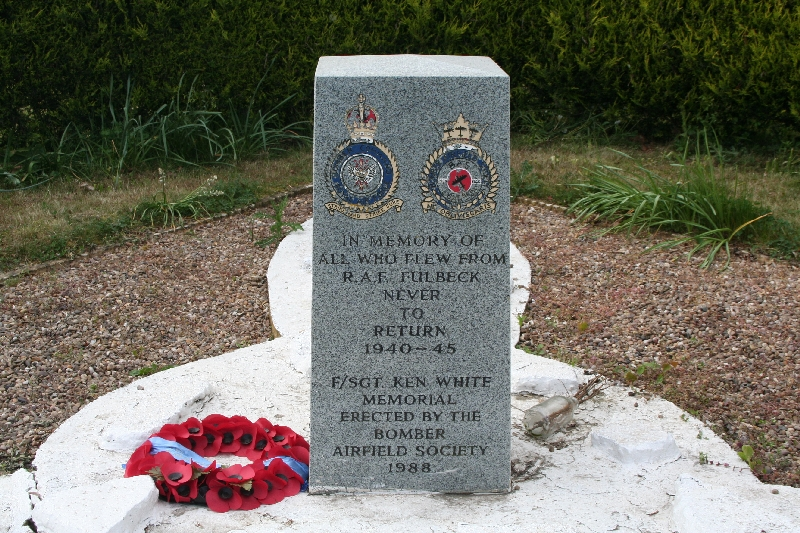
RAF Fulbeck memorial.

The runways, apart from narrow strips used as farm roads, were removed in the 1970s and all but three of the hardstandings but the perimeter track was kept intact. Small sections of the 30 and 01 runway ends, however, still exist in their full width. Fulbeck karting circuit use sections of the old runway for racing on. At one time Fulbeck was proposed for a nuclear waste disposal site.

== See also ==
- List of former Royal Air Force stations
