= 72nd Air Refueling Squadron =

US Air Force unit

72nd Air Refueling Squadron

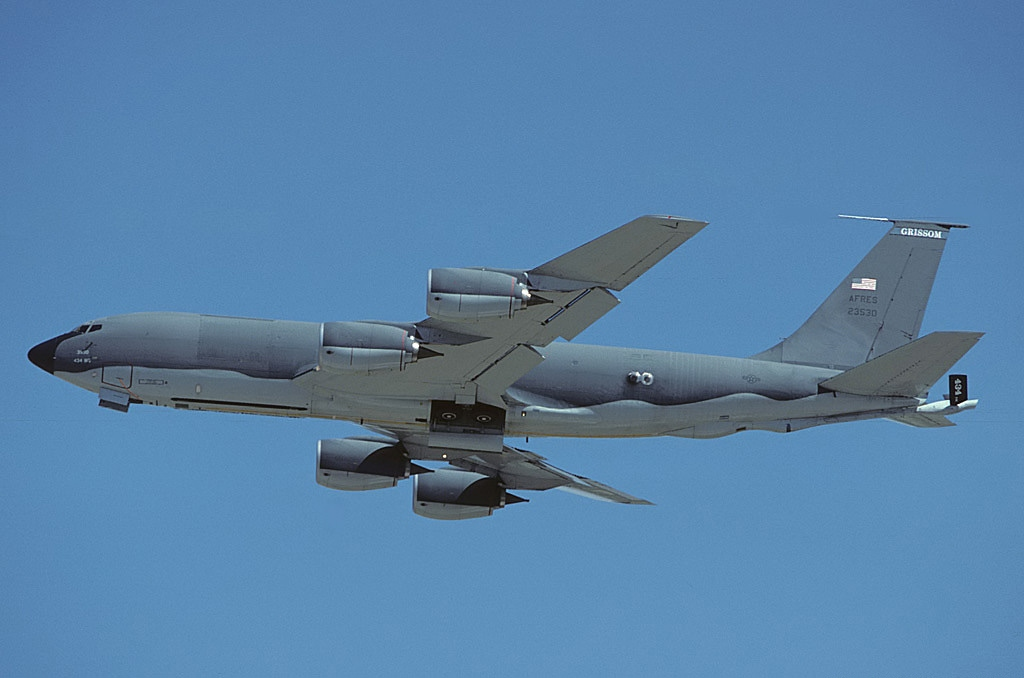
- 72nd Air Refueling Squadron KC-135R Stratotanker, circa 1995
- Active: 1943–1946; 1947–1953; 1953–1973; 1978–present
- Country: United States
- Branch: United States Air Force
- Role: Aerial refueling
- Size: 8 KC-135R and approximately 50 Personnel
- Part of: Air Force Reserve Command
- Garrison/HQ: Grissom Joint Air Reserve Base
- Nickname(s): The Darkside
- Colors: Blue and gold
- Engagements: Operation Overlord; Operation Market Garden; Battle of the Bulge; Operation Plunder
- Decorations: Distinguished Unit Citation; Air Force Outstanding Unit Award; French Croix de Guerre with Palm; French Fourragere; Republic of Vietnam Gallantry Cross with Palm

Insignia
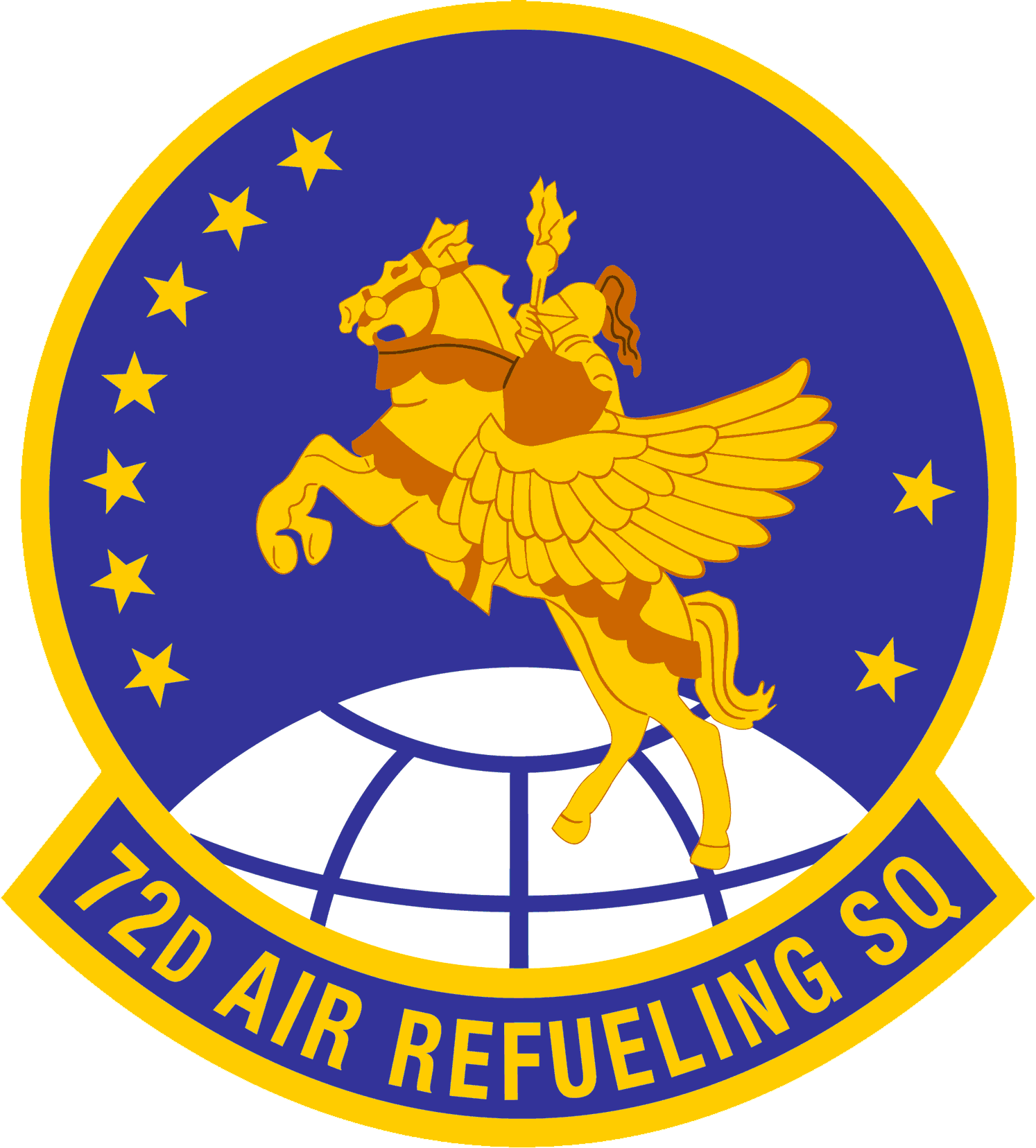
- 72nd Air Refueling Squadron emblem (approved 1 February 1989)

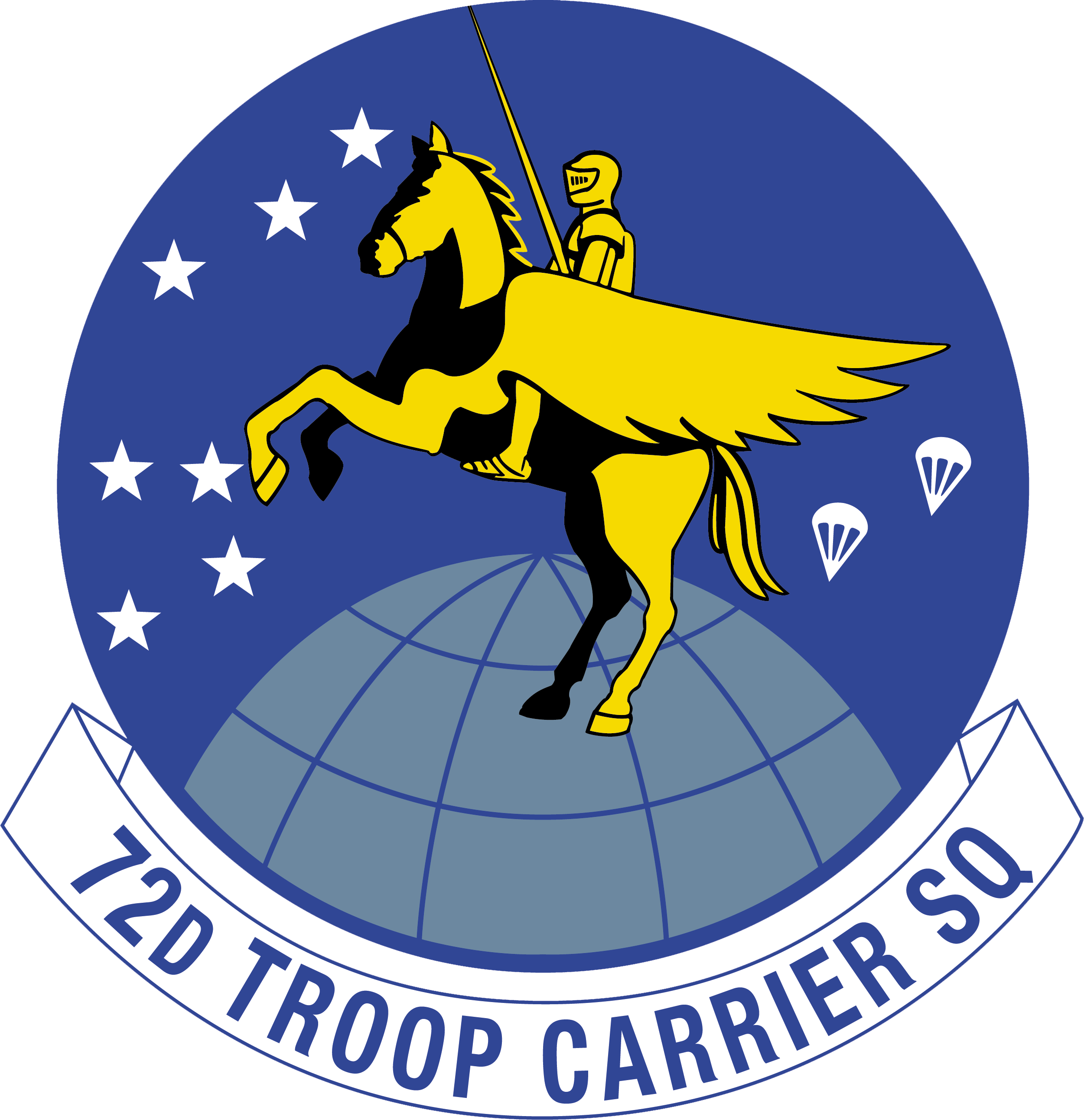
- 72nd Troop Carrier Squadron emblem (approved 26 February 1960)

Aircraft flown
- Tanker: KC-135R Stratotanker

The 72nd Air Refueling Squadron is a United States Air Force Reserve squadron, assigned to the 434th Operations Group, 434th Air Refueling Wing at Grissom Joint Air Reserve Base, Indiana. The 72nd operates the Boeing KC-135 Stratotanker aircraft conducting air refueling missions.

== Overview ==
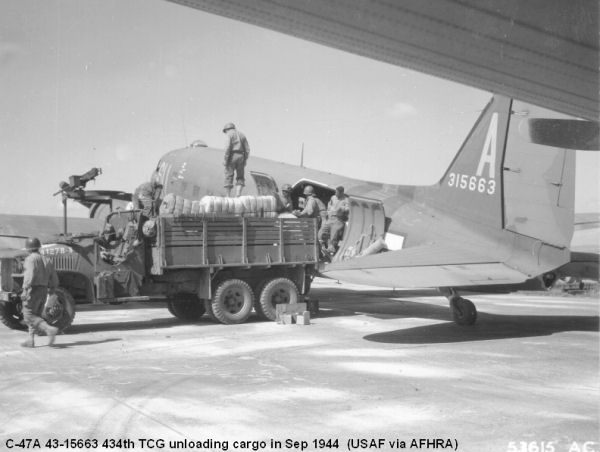
Douglas C-47A-90-DL, Serial 43-15663 of the 72nd Troop Carrier Squadron.

The 72nd Air Refueling Squadron's primary mission is to provide Global Reach by force extending through air refueling operations for the United States Military and its allies. Additionally the unit is tasked with aeromedical evacuation support, airlift, and passenger transport.

== History ==
=== Origins - World War II ===
The 72nd Air Refueling Squadron originated as the 72nd Troop Carrier Squadron on 3 January 1943. The squadron was activated on 9 February 1943 at Alliance Army Air Field, Nebraska assigned to the 434th Troop Carrier Group. In September 1943 equipped with Douglas C-47 Skytrains, the unit moved to Baer Field, Indiana at which today is the Fort Wayne International Airport. Shortly thereafter the squadron deployed to Europe to fight alongside the British and other Allied Forces. During its time in Europe, the squadron operated out of RAF Fulbeck, England, RAF Aldermaston and finally out of Mourmelon-le-Grand Airfield, France. It participated in airborne assaults on Normandy, the Netherlands, and Germany and the relief of Bastogne. It was credited with participation in the Normandy, Northern France, Rhineland, Ardennes-Alsace, and Central Europe campaigns. It earned the Distinguished Unit Citation and French Croix de Guerre with Palm for its participation in the airborne assault on Normandy, and later earned the French Fourragere. In addition to the C-47, the squadron also flew Airspeed Horsa gliders, as well as Waco CG-4 gliders during the war. After the war the 72nd returned to Baer Field, in August 1945 and then back to Alliance Army Air Field in September 1945. In October 1945 the unit moved to George Field, Illinois, and finally in February 1946 it moved to Greenville Army Air Base, South Carolina where it was inactivated on 31 July 1946.

On 1 August 1947 the unit was reactivated as the 72nd Troop Carrier Squadron in the reserves at Baer Field. It was assigned to the 434th Troop Carrier Group, equipped with C-47s.

=== Korean War - 1973 ===
In July 1949 the squadron and group moved to Atterbury Air Force Base, Indiana, which today is the Columbus Indiana Municipal Airport, where they transitioned to the Curtiss C-46 Commando. Starting in May 1951 as part of the Korean mobilization the unit served under Tactical Air Command's Eighteenth Air Force for the next 21 months where it supported Army paratroop training in Georgia. In addition the 72nd participated in Exercises Southern Pine and Long Horn, as well as conducting routine airlift and troop carrier missions for Tactical Air Command. The squadron returned to Atterbury in February 1953. By 1957 Atterbury had been renamed Bakalar Air Force Base, and in the same year the 72nd converted to Fairchild C-119 Flying Boxcars In 1962 as a result of the Cuban Missile Crisis, the squadron served for 32 days supporting the deployment of Air Force strategic and tactical resources to the Southeast corner of the country and their redeployment there from.

In July 1969, wing, group, and squadron were redesignated as tactical air support units and were reequipped with Cessna U-3As and Cessna O-2A Skymasters. On 31 December 1969, in connection with the closing of Bakalar, the 434th Wing was inactivated and the 931st Tactical Air Support Group and its squadron moved to Grissom Air Force Base, IN. First reassigned to the 403rd Composite Wing on 1 June 1970 and then on 15 January 1971 to the 434th Special Operations Wing, concurrently activated and collocated with group and squadron at Grissom. On 1 March 1971, group and squadron converted to Cessna A-37 Dragonflys and were redesignated as special operations units. On 15 September 1973, the 434th Wing was redesignated as a tactical fighter wing. On 1 October 1973, the 72nd Special Operations Squadron was inactivated in favor of the 46th Tactical Fighter Squadron because at the time another 72nd Tactical Fighter Squadron existed.

=== Air Force Reserve - Desert Storm ===
On 18 May 1977 the squadron was redesignated as the 72nd Air Refueling Squadron, Heavy, and was assigned to the Air Force Reserve. HQ Air Force Reserve activated the 72nd Air Refueling Squadron on 1 July 1978. In July 1987 the 434th Tactical Fighter Wing was redesignated as the 434th Air Refueling Wing of which the 72nd was a part. In 1990 the 72nd as part of the 434th were recalled to active duty for the Gulf War and helped to form one of the largest tanker task forces ever assembled operating out of western Saudi Arabia. The 72nd and its partners flew more than 7,000 refueling missions, offloading fuel to more than 25,000 coalition aircraft. In June 1992, the 434th Air Refueling Wing with its Boeing KC-135 Stratotankers and the 930th Fighter Group with its Fairchild Republic A-10 Thunderbolt IIs merged to form a composite wing to include the 72nd and was designated the 434th Wing. In 1994 the A-10 squadron under the 434th inactivated and the 434th Wing reorganized as the 434th Air Refueling Wing once again.

=== Kosovo - Present ===
During the 1990s the 72nd deployed personnel and aircraft numerous times to support "No Fly" operations in the Balkans, as well as Operations Northern and Southern Watch over Iraq. In May 1999, the 72nd and the 434th were activated to provide aerial refueling support to Operation Allied Force deployed out of Rhein Mein AB in Germany as part of the war in Kosovo. In September 2001, just days after the September 11 terrorist attacks the squadron was activated for a year. The squadron initially deployed to the Pacific theatre to help provide a western air bridge in preparation for the War in Afghanistan (2001-2021). Later during that year, the 72nd was deployed to a classified Southwest Asia location flying air refueling missions for U.S. and other allied fighters and bombers. The unit's activation ended in late summer of 2002, but 6 months later in Feb of 2003 the 72nd was again activated for a six-month stint in support of Operation Iraqi Freedom. Most of the unit staged out of Moron AB, Spain, with a smaller elements staging out of RAF Akrotiri, Cyprus and Diego Garcia in the Indian Ocean. Although the unit activation supporting the Iraq War ended in late 2003, the 72nd continued to provide worldwide air refueling and air mobility support for Operations Noble Eagle, the War in Afghanistan, and the U.S. involvement in the Iraq War (2003-2010).

== Lineage ==
- Constituted as the 72nd Troop Carrier Squadron on 30 January 1943

Activated on 9 February 1943
Inactivated on 31 July 1946

- Activated in the reserve on 1 August 1947

Redesignated 72nd Troop Carrier Squadron, Medium on 1 July 1949
Ordered to active service on 1 May 1951
Inactivated on 1 Feb 1953

- Activated in the reserve on 1 February 1953

Ordered to active service on 28 October 1962
Relieved from active service on 28 November 1962
Redesignated 72nd Tactical Airlift Squadron on 1 July 1967
Redesignated 72nd Tactical Air Support Squadron on 25 June 1969
Redesignated 72nd Special Operations Squadron on 1 March 1971
Inactivated on 1 October 1973

- Redesignated 72nd Air Refueling Squadron, Heavy on 18 May 1977

Activated in the reserve on 1 July 1978
Redesignated 72nd Air Refueling Squadron on 1 Feb 1992

=== Assignments ===
- 434th Troop Carrier Group, 9 February 1943 – 31 July 1946
- 434th Troop Carrier Group, 1 August 1947 – 1 February 1953
- 434th Troop Carrier Group, 1 February 1953
- 434th Troop Carrier Wing, 14 April 1959
- 931st Troop Carrier Group (later 931st Tactical Airlift Group 931st Tactical Air Support Group 931st Special Operations Group), 11 February 1963 – 1 October 1973
- 931st Air Refueling Group, 1 July 1978
- 434th Air Refueling Wing, 1 July 1987
- 434th Operations Group, 1 August 1992 – present

=== Stations ===
- Alliance Army Air Field, Nebraska, 9 February 1943
- Baer Field, Indiana, 3–24 September 1943
- RAF Fulbeck (AAF-488), England, 7 October 1943
- RAF Welford (AAF-474), England, 10 December 1943
- RAF Aldermaston (AAF-467), England, 3 March 1944 – February 1945
- Mourmelon-le-Grand Airfield (A-80), France, February–June 1945
- Baer Field, Indiana, 5 Aug 1945
- Alliance Army Air Field, Nebraska, 15 September 1945
- George Field, Illinois, 11 October 1945
- Greenville Army Air Base, 2 February–31 July 1946
- Baer Field, Indiana, 1 August 1947
- Atterbury Air Force Base, Indiana, 1 February 1953
- Lawson Air Force Base, Georgia, 23 January 1952 – 1 February 1953
- Bakalar Air Force Base, Indiana, 1 February 1953
- Grissom Air Force Base, Indiana, 1 January 1970 – 1 October 1973
- Grissom Air Force Base, Indiana, 1 July 1978 – present

=== Aircraft ===
- Douglas C-47 Skytrain (1943–1946, 1949)
- Airspeed Horsa (1944–1945)
- Waco CG-4 (1944–1945)
- Curtiss C-46 Commando (1945–1946, 1949–1957)
- Beechcraft T-7 Navigator (1949–1951)
- Beechcraft T-11 Kansan (1949–1953)
- North American T-6 Texan (1953)
- Beechcraft C-45 Expeditor (1953–1957)
- Fairchild C-119 Flying Boxcar (1957–1969)
- O-2 Skymaster (1969–1971)
- U-3 Blue Canoe (1969–1971)
- A-37 Dragonfly (1971–1973)
- KC-135 Stratotanker (1978 – present)

=== Operations ===
- World War II
- Operation Desert Storm
- Operation Allied Force
- Operation Northern Watch
- Operation Southern Watch
- Operation Noble Eagle
- Operation Iraqi Freedom
- Operation Enduring Freedom
