= 434th Air Refueling Wing =

US Air Force unit, part of Air Force Reserve

434th Air Refueling Wing

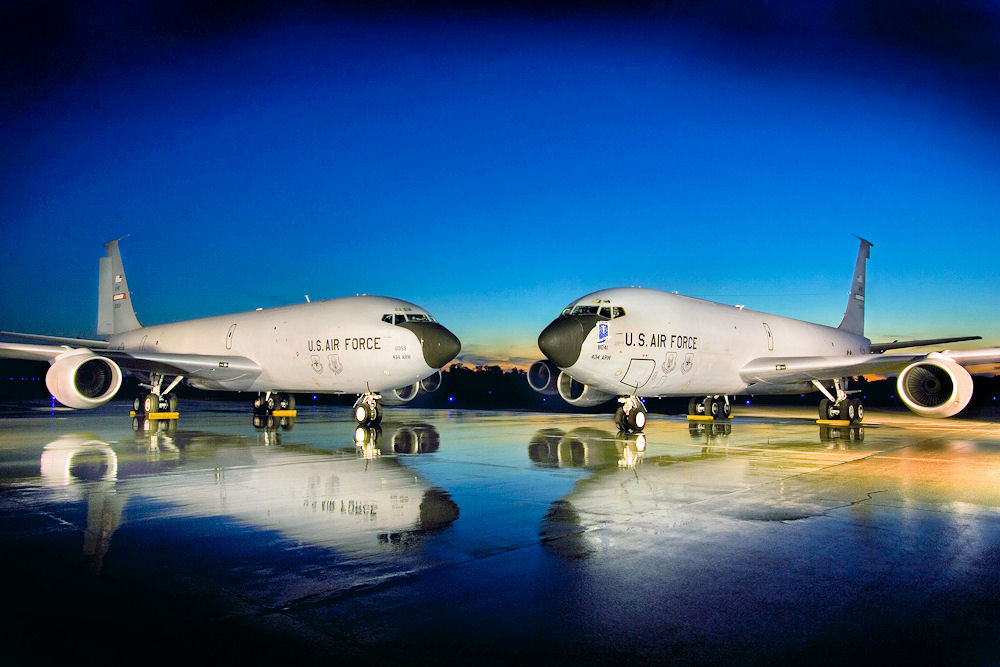
- KC-135R Stratotankers of the 434th Wing
- Active: 1949–1953; 1953–1969; 1971–present
- Country: United States
- Branch: United States Air Force
- Type: Wing
- Role: Aerial refueling
- Part of: Air Force Reserve Command
- Garrison/HQ: Grissom Air Reserve Base, Indiana
- Decorations: Air Force Outstanding Unit Award; Republic of Vietnam Gallantry Cross with Palm

Commanders
- Current commander: Colonel Jon Bergman

Insignia
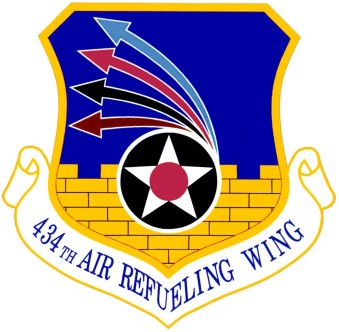
- 434th Air Refueling Wing emblem (Note: Approved 5 June 1995.)

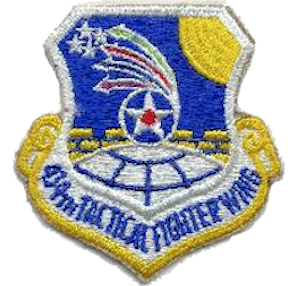
- Patch with 434th Tactical Fighter Wing emblem (Note: Approved 27 June 1975.)

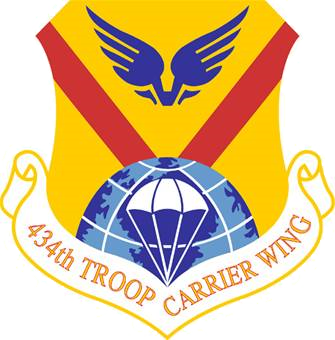
- 434th Troop Carrier Wing emblem (Note: Approved 10 October 1952.)

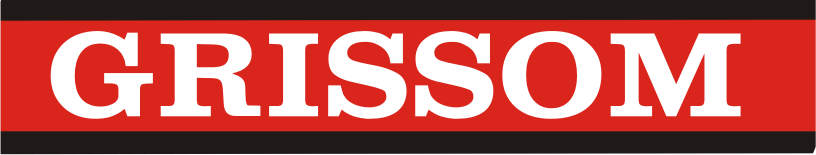
- Tail stripe

Aircraft flown
- Tanker: KC-135R Stratotanker

The 434th Air Refueling Wing is an Air Reserve Component of the United States Air Force. It is assigned to the Fourth Air Force, Air Force Reserve Command, stationed at Grissom Air Reserve Base, Indiana. The 434th Air Refueling Wing principal mission is air refueling. If mobilized, the Wing is gained by the Air Mobility Command. In July 1949, Continental Air Command (ConAC) reopened Atterbury Air Force Base, Indiana, a World War II field, as a training base for reserve flying units and activated the 434th Troop Carrier Wing there the wing initially flew the Douglas C-47 Skytrain, but soon converted to Curtiss C-46 Commandos, and is now operating the Boeing KC-135 Stratotanker.

Today, the 434th is one of the Air Force's busiest air refueling reorganizations, frequently deploying its personnel and aircraft around the world to support combat forces as part of the global war on terrorism. Most recently, the wing has been mobilized in support of Operation Inherent Resolve. The wing has also deployed in support of Operation Enduring Freedom, Operation Iraqi Freedom, Operation New Dawn, and Operation Noble Eagle.

== Overview ==
Media related to 434th Air Refueling Wing (United States Air Force) at Wikimedia Commons

The 434th Air Refueling Wing principal mission is air refueling. The wing enhances the Air Force's capability to accomplish its primary missions of global reach and global power. It also provides air refueling support to Air Force, Navy and Marine Corps aircraft as well as aircraft of allied nations. The wing is also capable of transporting litter and ambulatory patients using patient support pallets during aeromedical evacuations.

It also has special taskings to generate aircraft and crews in support of the Air Mobility Command. Air Force Reserve Command, Robins Air Force Base, Georgia, and 4th Air Force, March Air Reserve Base, California, provide command and supervisory guidance prior to mobilization.

The 434th Air Refueling Wing regularly participates in exercises and front-line operations to support America's national interests. The Air Force Reserve Command provides a substantial portion of the Department of Defense's total aerial refueling capability. Hence, the 434th receives its share of taskings both during peacetime and times of crisis to support our nation's active duty military forces. It holds the record for most air refuelings in a one-week period when the unit performed 290 aerial refuelings, with over one million pounds of fuel offloaded. The unit also set a single day record of refueling 90 aircraft, with over 283,000 pounds of fuel offloaded. These records were established in 1981.

In addition to being a self-contained combat-ready unit, the 434th Air Refueling Wing also has the responsibility to operate and maintain Grissom Air Reserve Base. Grissom is one of only five Air Force Reserve Bases nationwide

== Units ==
The 434th Air Refueling Wing consists of the following major units:

434th Operations Group

434th Operations Support Squadron
72nd Air Refueling Squadron
74th Air Refueling Squadron

434th Maintenance Group

434th Aircraft Maintenance Squadron
434th Maintenance Squadron

434th Mission Support Group

434th Force Support Squadron
434th Security Forces Squadron
434th Civil Engineer Squadron
434th Communications Squadron
434th Operational Contracting Flight
434th Logistics Readiness Squadron
49th Aerial Port Squadron

434th Aerospace Medicine Squadron

Included in these major organizations are such areas as flight operations, aircraft maintenance, plans and programs, safety, airfield management, security police, military personnel, services, communications, medical support, information management, administration, and civil engineering.

== History ==
=== Initial activation and Korean War mobilization ===
In July 1949, Continental Air Command (ConAC) reopened Atterbury Air Force Base, Indiana, a World War II field, as a training base for reserve flying units and activated the 434th Troop Carrier Wing there. The wing was organized under the wing base organization, and its operational component, the 434th Troop Carrier Group, moved to Atterbury from Stout Field, Indiana. President Truman's reduced 1949 defense budget also required reductions in the number of units in the Air Force, and the wing drew its cadre from the 323d Air Division, which was inactivated at Stout. The wing was manned at 25% of normal strength but its combat group was authorized four squadrons rather than the three of active duty units. The wing trained under the supervision of the 2466th Air Force Reserve Training Center at Atterbury.

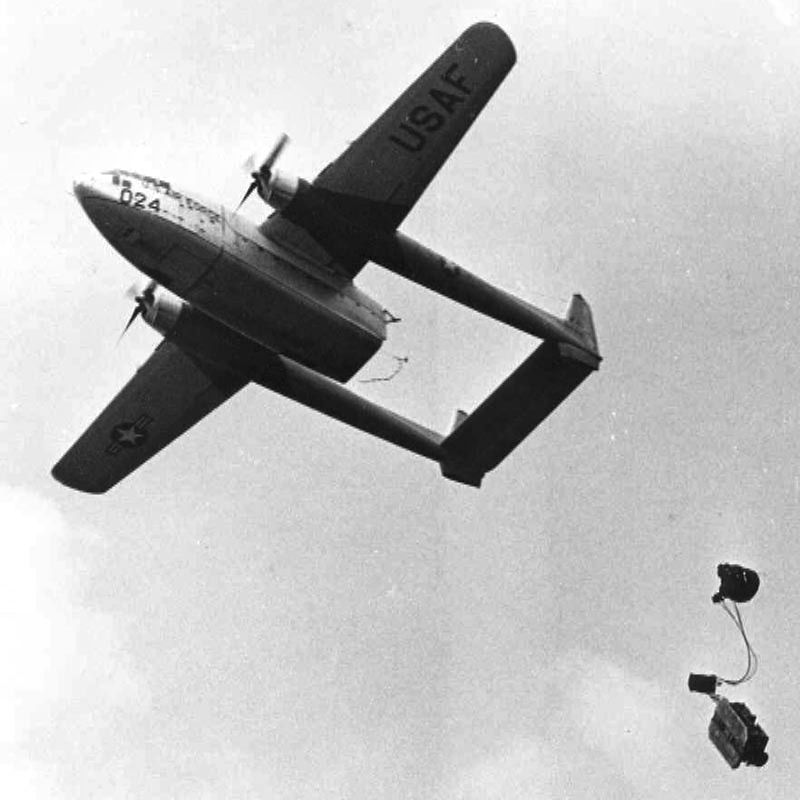
Wing C-119 Flying Boxcar

The wing initially flew the Douglas C-47 Skytrain, but soon converted to Curtiss C-46 Commandos, and training for the most part consisted of transition flying training. Before the transition was completed, the Group spent two weeks in the summer of 1950 (8–22 July) on active duty in a summer encampment.

All reserve combat and corollary units, including the 434th Wing, were mobilized for the Korean war. The wing was part of the second wave of reserve activations, which included all Tenth Air Force units. These units were used as fillers for other units, except for 434th. Instead, the wing was one of six C-46 wings mobilized for Tactical Air Command, which used them to form Eighteenth Air Force.

The wing trained at Atterbury until January 1952, when it moved to Lawson Air Force Base, Georgia. It flew in military exercises and flew missions to support Army airborne forces training at Fort Benning. In September, the wing began to provide combat crew training for aircrews being assigned to C-46 units with Far East Air Forces. On 1 February 1953, the wing transferred its mission, personnel and equipment to the newly activated 464th Troop Carrier Wing, a regular Air Force unit, and was inactivated.

=== Reactivation in the reserves ===
The wing was reactivated at Atterbury the same day, taking over the aircraft and personnel of the 87th Troop Carrier Wing, which was inactivated. The reserve mobilization for the Korean war had left the Reserve without aircraft until July 1952 and the 87th Wing had been formed at that time. The 434th returned to its previous reserve training role upon its return.

During the first half of 1955, the Air Force began detaching Air Force Reserve squadrons from their parent wing locations to separate sites. The concept offered several advantages: communities were more likely to accept the smaller squadrons than the large wings and the location of separate squadrons in smaller population centers would facilitate recruiting and manning. As it finally evolved in the spring of 1955, the Continental Air Command's plan called for placing Air Force Reserve units at fifty-nine installations located throughout the United States. In time, the detached squadron program proved successful in attracting additional participants Although the 71st and 72d Troop Carrier Squadrons remained at Bakalar Air Force Base, (Note: On 13 November 1954, the base was renamed Bakalar Air Force Base in a formal dedication ceremony in honor of First Lieutenant John Edmond Bakalar.) the 73d Troop Carrier Squadron moved to Dress Memorial Airport, Indiana in June 1957, then to Scott Air Force Base, Illinois in November.

The 434th continued to train with the 2466th Center, converting from Curtiss Commandos to the Fairchild C-119 Flying Boxcar in 1957. However, in July 1959 the center was inactivated and some of its personnel were absorbed by the wing. In place of active duty support for reserve units, ConAC adopted the Air Reserve Technician Program, in which a cadre of the unit consisted of full-time personnel who were simultaneously civilian employees of the Air Force and held rank as members of the reserves. This followed a reorganization of the wing under the Dual Deputate organization, (Note: Under this plan flying squadrons reported to the wing Deputy Commander for Operations and maintenance squadrons reported to the wing Deputy Commander for Maintenance.) all flying squadrons were directly assigned to the wing and the 434th Troop Carrier Group was inactivated.

=== Activation of groups under the wing ===
Although the dispersal of flying units was not a problem when the entire wing was called to active service, mobilizing a single flying squadron and elements to support it proved difficult. This weakness was demonstrated in the partial mobilization of reserve units during the Berlin Crisis of 1961 To resolve this, at the start of 1962, ConAC determined to reorganize its reserve wings by establishing groups with support elements for each of its troop carrier squadrons. This reorganization would facilitate mobilization of elements of wings in various combinations when needed. However, as this plan was entering its implementation phase, another partial mobilization, which included the 434th Wing, occurred for the Cuban Missile Crisis, with the units being released on 28 November 1962 after a month of active service. The wing's C-119 squadrons began transporting supplies, equipment and Army personnel to Homestead Air Force Base, Florida. The formation of troop carrier groups was delayed until February 1963 for wings that had been mobilized. The 930th Troop Carrier Group and 931st Troop Carrier Group at Bakalar and the 932d Troop Carrier Group at Scott, were all assigned to the wing on 11 February.

On 1 October 1966, the 932d Group was released from assignment to the 434th and reassigned to the 442d Military Airlift Wing at Richards-Gebaur Air Force Base, Missouri, in preparation for heavy cargo operations. On 1 July 1967, the 434th was redesignated the 434th Tactical Airlift Wing, its subordinate groups and squadrons also being re-designated as Tactical Airlift units.

On 13 May 1968, the 930th Tactical Airlift Group was mobilized for combat duty in the Vietnam War, the 71st Tactical Airlift Squadron's C-119 aircraft were selected for modification to the AC-119G Gunship configuration with powerful searchlights and rapid-fire machine guns. The squadron and its Bakalar reservists moved to Lockbourne Air Force Base, Ohio on 11 June. The 71st was subsequently redesignated as the 71st Air Commando Squadron on 15 June and eventually deployed to Nha Trang Air Base, South Vietnam on 5 December where it was assigned to the 14th Special Operations Wing. The 71st was the only USAF reserve unit to serve in Vietnam.

On 25 June 1969, the 931st Tactical Airlift Group was redesignated as the 931st Tactical Air Support Group and re-equipped with Cessna U-3A Blue Canoe light utility aircraft. The group's C-119s were transferred to the 71st Special Operations Squadron and modified to the AC-119G configuration.

Due to funding reductions in 1969, Bakalar Air Force Base was selected for closure. The 434th Tactical Airlift Wing was inactivated on 31 December 1969 with the closure of Bakalar AFB.

On 15 January 1971, the 434th was reactivated at Grissom Air Force Base, Indiana, as the 434th Special Operations Wing. Its operational squadron was the 71st Special Operations Squadron, with the AC-119s transferred from Bakalar AFB.

The 434th conducted routine reserve training until 30 September 1973 when its 71st SOS was inactivated and its AC-119s retired. The wing was redesignated as the 434th Tactical Fighter Wing with a new tactical air operation mission. The 45th and 46th Tactical Fighter Squadron were equipped with Cessna A-37 Dragonfly aircraft for close air support missions. The 46th was inactivated on 1 July 1978. The 434th provided combat crew training for USAF and friendly foreign nations until June 1980. The A-37s were then transferred to other units.

In April 1981, the 434th received the Fairchild Republic A-10 Thunderbolt II aircraft and the wing's mission changed to training forward air controllers. The 45th Squadron provided A-10 tactical fighter training for reserve and guard pilots until June 1987 when the squadron was reassigned to the 930th Tactical Fighter Group at Grissom, which was assigned to the 434th as a subordinate unit until 30 September 1994 when it was inactivated.

=== Post Cold War era ===
Reflecting the 434th's composite mission, the 434th was redesignated as the 434th Wing on 1 August 1992 and also implemented the Objective Organization Plan. The 434th Operations Group was activated that date. The 434th Wing, consisted of Boeing KC-135 Stratotanker and A-10 Thunderbolt II aircraft and was responsible for air refueling and close air support missions.

Changes in the Air Force mission led to the unit being reorganized once again. The 1993 Base Realignment and Closure Commission directed realignment of Grissom to the Air Force Reserve. The wing assumed KC-135s of the active-duty 305th Air Refueling Wing, which moved to McGuire Air Force Base, New Jersey.

With the transfer of the A-10 equipped 930th Group on 30 September 1994, the wing was again redesignated as the 434th Air Refueling Wing on 1 October 1994. During the December 1993 to February 1997 time period, the wing staged four separate deployments to Europe to support Operation Decisive Endeavor, the United Nations' enforcement of the no-fly zone over war-torn Bosnia. In May 1999, the 434th ARW was called upon to provide aerial refueling support to Operation Allied Force as personnel and aircraft were deployed to various European locations.

In 1997 Grissom was reassigned to Air Force Reserve Command.

=== Global war on terrorism ===
Today, the 434th is one of the Air Force's busiest air refueling reorganizations, frequently deploying its personnel and aircraft around the world to support combat forces as part of the global war on terrorism. Most recently, the wing has been mobilized in support of Operation Inherent Resolve. The wing has also deployed in support of Operation Enduring Freedom, Operation Iraqi Freedom, Operation New Dawn, and Operation Noble Eagle.

== Lineage ==
- Established as the 434th Troop Carrier Wing, Medium and activated in the Reserve on 1 July 1949

Ordered to active service on 1 May 1951
Inactivated on 1 February 1953

- Activated in the Reserve on 1 February 1953

Ordered to active service on 28 October 1962
Relieved from active service on 28 November 1962
Redesignated 434th Tactical Airlift Wing on 1 July 1967
Inactivated on 31 December 1969

- Redesignated 434th Special Operations Wing on 12 January 1971

Activated in the Reserve on 15 January 1971
Redesignated 434th Tactical Fighter Wing on 1 October 1973
Redesignated 434th Air Refueling Wing, Heavy on 1 July 1987
Redesignated 434th Air Refueling Wing on 1 February 1992
Redesignated 434th Wing on 1 August 1992
Redesignated 434th Air Refueling Wing on 1 October 1994

=== Assignments ===
- Tenth Air Force, 1 July 1949
- Tactical Air Command, 2 May 1951
- Eighteenth Air Force, 1 June 1951 – 1 February 1953
- Second Air Reserve District, 1 February 1953
- Tenth Air Force, 15 April 1953
- Fifth Air Force Reserve Region, 1 September 1960
- Twelfth Air Force, 28 October 1962
- Fifth Air Force Reserve Region, 28 November 1962 – 31 December 1969
- Central Air Force Reserve Region, 15 January 1971
- Tenth Air Force, 8 October 1976
- Twenty-Second Air Force, 1 October 1993
- Fourth Air Force, 1 April 1997 – present

=== Components ===
Groups

- 98th Air Refueling Group: 1 October 1987 – 1 August 1992
- 434th Troop Carrier Group (later 434th Operations Group): 1 July 1949 – 1 February 1953; 1 February 1953 – 14 April 1959; 1 August 1992 – present
- 442d Tactical Fighter Group: 1 October 1982 – 1 February 1984
- 908th Tactical Air Support Group: 1 July – 25 October 1971 (detached after 1 October 1971)
- 910th Tactical Air Support Group (later 910th Special OperationsGroup, 910 Tactical Fighter Group): 21 April 1971 – 1 April 1981
- 916th Air Refueling Group: 1 July 1987 – 1 October 1994
- 917th Military Airlift Group (later 917th Special Operations; 917 Tactical Fighter) Group: 25 February 1972 – 1 July 1987
- 926th Tactical Airlift Group (later 926th Tactical Fighter Group): 1 January 1978 – 1 February 1984
- 927th Air Refueling Group: 1 August 1992 – 1 October 1994
- 930th Troop Carrier Group (later 930th Tactical Airlift Group, 930th Special Operations Group, 930th Tactical Fighter Group, 930th Operations Group): 11 February 1963 – 13 May 1968; 18 June-31 December 1969; 15 January 1971 – 1 July 1975; 1 August 1992 – 30 September 1994
- 931st Troop Carrier Group (later 931st Tactical Airlift Group, 931st Tactical Air Support Group 931st Special Operations Group, 931st Tactical Fighter Group): 11 February 1963 – 31 December 1969; 15 January 1971 – 1 July 1975
- 932d Troop Carrier Group: 11 February 1963 – 1 October 1966

Squadrons

- 45th Tactical Fighter Squadron: 1 July 1975 – 1 July 1987
- 46th Tactical Fighter Squadron: 1 July 1975 – 1 July 1978
- 71st Troop Carrier Squadron: 14 April 1959 – 11 February 1963
- 72d Troop Carrier Squadron (later 72d Air Refueling Squadron): 14 April 1959 – 11 February 1963; 1 July 1987 – 1 August 1992
- 73d Troop Carrier Squadron: 14 April 1959 – 11 February 1963

=== Stations ===
- Atterbury Air Force Base, Indiana, 1 July 1949
- Lawson Air Force Base, Georgia, 23 January 1952 – 1 February 1953
- Atterbury Air Force Base (later Bakalar Air Force Base), Indiana, 1 February 1953 – 31 December 1969
- Grissom Air Force Base (later Grissom Air Reserve Base), Indiana, 15 January 1971 – present

=== Aircraft ===
- Douglas C-47 Skytrain, 1949
- C-46 Commando, 1949–1953; 1953–1957
- North American T-6 Texan, 1953
- Beechcraft T-7 Navigator, 1953–1957
- Beechcraft T-11 Wichita, 1953–1957
- Beechcraft C-45 Expeditor, 1953–1957
- Fairchild C-119 Flying Boxcar, 1957–1969
- Cessna U-3 Blue Canoe, 1969, 1971
- Cessna O-2 Skymaster, 1971
- Cessna A-37 Dragonfly, 1971–1982
- Douglas C-124 Globemaster II, 1972
- Fairchild Republic A-10 Thunderbolt II, 1980–1987, 1992–1994
- Fairchild Republic OA-10 Thunderbolt II, 1980–1987, 1992–1994
- McDonnell Douglas KC-10 Extender, 1987–1994
- Boeing KC-135 Stratotanker, 1987–present
