= 74th Air Refueling Squadron =

US Air Force reserve unit

74th Air Refueling Squadron

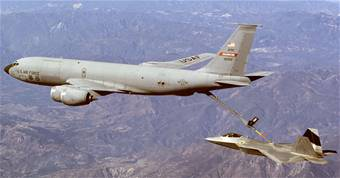
- A KC-135R Stratotanker from Grissom ARB refuels an F-22A from Langley AFB
- Active: 1943–1946 1947–1951 1992–present
- Country: United States
- Branch: United States Air Force
- Role: Aerial refueling
- Part of: Air Force Reserve Command
- Garrison/HQ: Grissom Air Reserve Base
- Engagements: Operation Overlord; Operation Market Garden; Battle of the Bulge; Operation Plunder
- Decorations: Distinguished Unit Citation Air Force Outstanding Unit Award French Croix de Guerre with Palm French Fourragère

Insignia
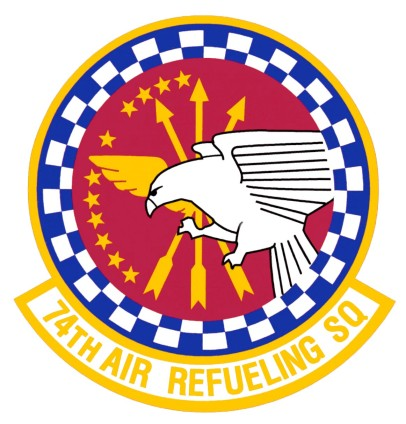
- 74th Air Refueling Squadron emblem (Note: Approved 15 May 1995.)

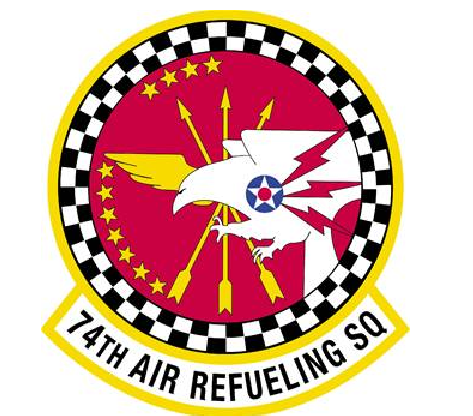
- 74th Air Refueling Squadron emblem (1992-1995)

Aircraft flown
- Tanker: KC-135 Stratotanker

The 74th Air Refueling Squadron is a United States Air Force Reserve squadron, assigned to the 434th Operations Group, stationed at Grissom Joint Air Reserve Base, Indiana.

== Overview ==
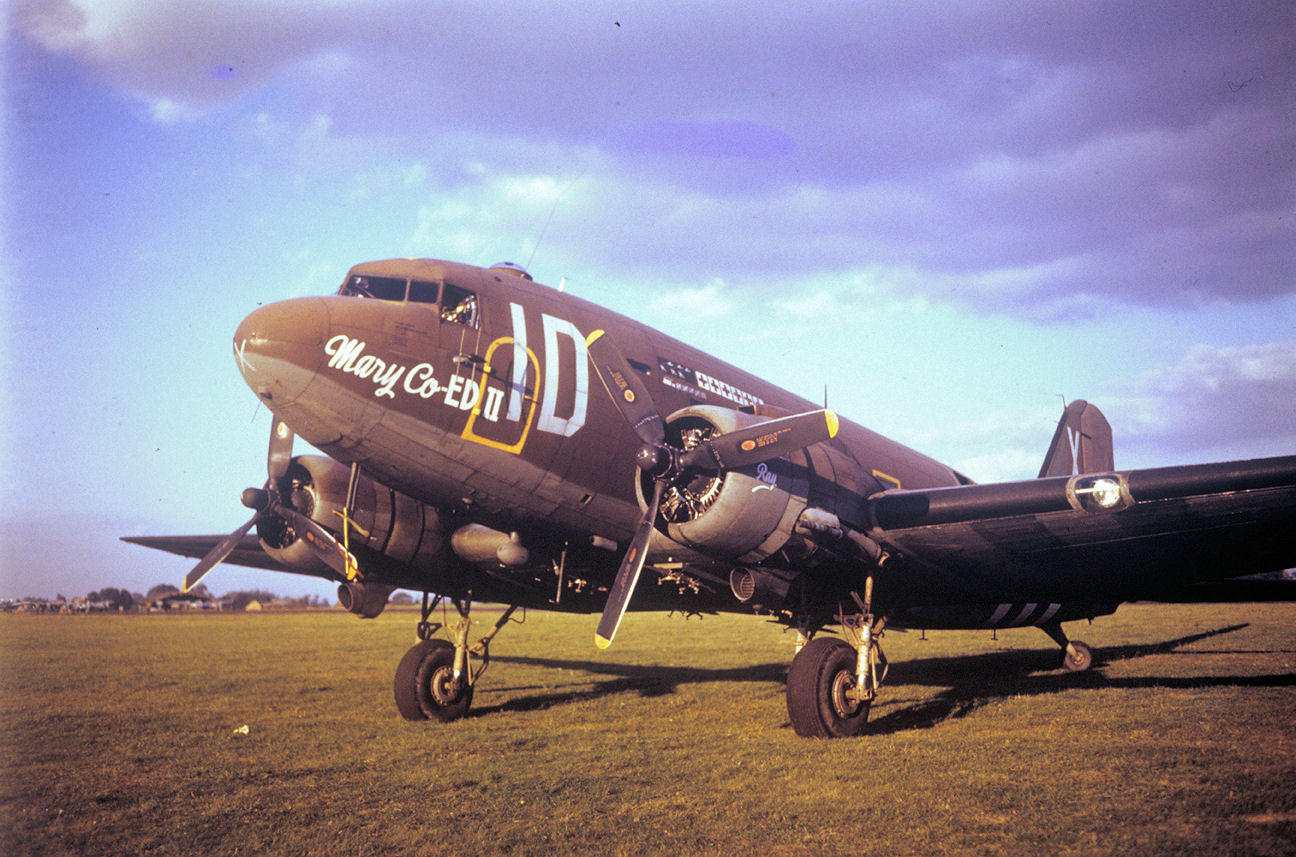
Douglas C-47 of the 74th Troop Carrier Squadron.

The 74th ARS operates the KC-135 Stratotanker aircraft conducting aerial refueling missions.

== History ==
=== World War II ===
Established in early 1943 as a Douglas C-47 Skytrain transport squadron under First Air Force, later trained under I Troop Carrier Command in the eastern United States. Deployed to England in late 1943, being assigned to IX Troop Carrier Command to participate in the buildup of forces prior to the Allied landings in France during D-Day in June 1944.

Engaged in combat operations by dropping paratroops into Normandy on D-Day (6 June 1944) and releasing gliders with reinforcements on the following day. The unit received a Distinguished Unit Citation and a French citation for these missions.

After the Normandy invasion the squadron ferried supplies in the United Kingdom. The squadron also hauled food, clothing, medicine, gasoline, ordnance equipment, and other supplies to the front lines and evacuated patients to rear zone hospitals. It dropped paratroops near Nijmegen and towed gliders carrying reinforcements during the airborne attack on the Netherlands. In December, it participated in the Battle of the Bulge by releasing gliders with supplies for the 101st Airborne Division near Bastogne.

Moved to France in early 1945, and participated in the Western Allied invasion of Germany, participating in the air assault across the Rhine River in March 1945, each aircraft towed two gliders with troops of the 17th Airborne Division and released them near Wesel.

Returned to the United States in August, 1945, becoming a domestic troop carrier squadron for Continental Air Forces, inactivated July 1946.

=== Reserve flying and Korean War mobilization ===
The squadron trained in troop carrier duties from 1947-1951.

=== Air refueling operations ===
It has performed air refueling missions worldwide since 1992. Since late 1993 the 74th periodically deployed to Italy and other western European locations in support of NATO operations in the Balkans.

=== Campaigns and decorations ===
- Campaigns. World War II: Egypt-Libya; Tunisia; Sicily; Naples-Foggia; Rome-Arno; Normandy; Northern France; Rhineland; Central Europe.
- Decorations. Distinguished Unit Citation: France, [6-7] Jun 1944. Air Force Outstanding Unit Awards: 1 Aug 1992 – 31 Aug 1993; 1 Sep 1994-31 Aug 1996. French Croix de Guerre with Palm: 6-7 Jun 1944; 20-28 Aug 1944. French Fourragere.

== Lineage ==
- Constituted as the 74th Troop Carrier Squadron on 30 January 1943

Activated on 9 February 1943
Inactivated on 31 July 1946

- Activated in the reserve on 15 March 1947

Redesignated 74th Troop Carrier Squadron, Medium on 1 July 1949
Ordered to active service on 1 May 1951
Inactivated on 2 May 1951

- Redesignated 74th Air Refueling Squadron and activated in the reserve on 1 August 1992

=== Assignments ===
- 434th Troop Carrier Group, 9 February 1943 – 31 July 1946
- 434th Troop Carrier Group, 15 March 1947 – 2 May 1951
- 434th Operations Group, 1 Aug 1992 – present

=== Stations ===
- Alliance Army Air Field, Nebraska, 9 February 1943
- Baer Field, Indiana, 4–28 September 1943
- RAF Fulbeck (AAF-488), England, October 1943
- RAF Welford (AAF-474), England, November 1943
- RAF Fulbeck (AAF-488), England, 10 January 1944
- RAF Aldermaston (AAF-467), England, 3 March 1944
- Mourmelon-le-Grand Airfield (A-80), France, February–June 1945
- Baer Field, Indiana, 5 August 1945
- Alliance Army Air Field, Nebraska, 15 September 1945
- George Field, Illinois, 11 October 1945
- Greenville Army Air Base, South Carolina, 2 February–31 July 1946
- Stout Field, Indiana, 15 March 1947
- Atterbury Air Force Base, Indiana, 1 July 1949 – 2 May 1951
- Grissom Air Force Base (later Grissom Air Reserve Base), Indiana, 1 August 1992 – present

=== Aircraft ===
- Douglas C-47 Skytrain (1943–1946, 1949)
- Airspeed Horsa (1944–1945)
- Waco CG-4 (1944–1945)
- Curtiss C-46 Commando (1945–1946, 1949–1951)
- Beechcraft T-7 Navigator (1949–1951)
- Beechcraft T-11 Kansan] (1949–1951)
- Boeing KC-135 Stratotanker (1992 – present)
