= 81st Troop Carrier Squadron =

- Active: 1943-1945; 1947-1951; 1955-1957
- Country: United States
- Branch: United States Air Force

The 81st Troop Carrier Squadron is an inactive United States Air Force unit. Its last assignment was with the 436th Troop Carrier Group, based at Grenier Air Force Base, New Hampshire. It was inactivated on 16 Nov 1957.

== History ==
Formed in April 1943 by I Troop Carrier Command, trained and equipped at various bases in the United States for the balance of the year. Deployed to England, being assigned to IX Troop Carrier Command, Ninth Air Force in early January 1944, during the Allied buildup prior to the invasion of France.

The squadron participated in the D-Day operation, dropping 101st Airborne Division paratroops near Cherbourg Naval Base, then carried out re-supply and glider delivery missions the following day.

The squadron's aircraft flew supplies into Normandy as soon as suitable landing strips were available and evacuated casualties to England. On 17 July the air echelon flew to Grosseto airbase in Italy to prepare for operations connected with the invasion of southern France returning to England on 24 August.

Squadron moved to France in July 1944 and for the balance of the Northern France Campaign and the Western Allied invasion of Germany was engaged in combat resupply of ground forces, operating from Advanced Landing Grounds in northern France. Delivered supplies to rough Resupply and Evacuation airfields near the front lines, returning combat casualties to field hospitals in rear areas. Dropped airborne forces during Operation Market-Garden in September 1944 into the Netherlands; later participated in the airborne invasion of Germany in March 1945. After V-E Day, the squadron evacuated prisoners of war.

Returned to the United States in August 1945, became a transport squadron for Continental Air Command until inactivation in November 1945 when it was inactivated.

Postwar the squadron was activated in the air force reserve in 1947, first at Godman AFB, then at Standiford Field, Louisville, Kentucky, operating C-46 Commandos for Tactical Air Command Eighteenth Air Force; activated during the Korean War in 1951, its aircraft and personnel being used as fillers for active duty units, then inactivated.

Reactivated as a reserve C-46 squadron at Grenier Air Force Base in 1955; inactivated 1957 due to budget reductions.

=== Operations and decorations ===
- Combat Operations. Airborne assaults on Normandy, Southern France, the Netherlands, and Germany; relief of Bastogne; transportation of cargo and personnel in ETO and MTO during World War II.
- Campaigns. Rome-Arno; Normandy; Northern France; southern France; Rhineland; Ardennes-Alsace; Central Europe.

== Lineage ==
- Constituted as the 81st Troop Carrier Squadron on 23 March 1943

Activated on 1 April 1943
Inactivated on 15 November 1945

- Activated in the reserve on 16 July 1947

Re-designated 81st Troop Carrier Squadron, Medium on 27 June 1949
Ordered to active service on 1 April 1951
Inactivated on 16 April 1951

- Activated in the reserve on 22 August 1955

Inactivated on 16 November 1957

=== Assignments ===
- 436th Troop Carrier Group, 1 April 1943 - 15 November 1945
- 436th Troop Carrier Group, 16 July 1947
- 434th Troop Carrier Group, 1 July 1948
- 436th Troop Carrier Group, 27 June 1949 - 16 April 1951
- 436th Troop Carrier Group, 22 August 1955 - 16 November 1957

=== Stations ===
- Baer Field, Indiana, 1 April 1943
- Alliance Army Air Field, Nebraska, 2 May 1943
- Laurinburg-Maxton Army Air Base, North Carolina, 4 August 1943
- Baer Field, Indiana, 16 December 1943 - 28 December 1943
- RAF Bottesford (AAF-481), England, January 1944
- RAF Membury (AAF-466), England, 3 March 1944 - February 1945

Operated from Voltone Airfield, Italy, 20 July 1944 - 23 August 1944

- Mourmelon-le-Grand Airfield (A-80), France, February 1945 - July 1945
- Baer Field, Indiana, 13 August 1945
- Malden Army Air Field, Missouri, 8 September 1945 - 15 November 1945
- Evansville Municipal Airport, Indiana, 16 July 1947
- Godman Air Force Base, Kentucky, 27 June 1949
- Standiford Municipal Airport, Kentucky, 10 October 1950 - 16 April 1951
- Grenier Air Force Base, New Hampshire, 22 August 1955 - 16 November 1957

=== Aircraft ===
- Douglas C-47 Skytrain, 1943–1946; 1949
- Airspeed Horsa (Glider), 1944–1945
- Waco CG-4 (Glider), 1944–1945
- Curtiss C-46 Commando, 1945–1946; 1949–1951; 1953–1957
