= 375th Operations Group =

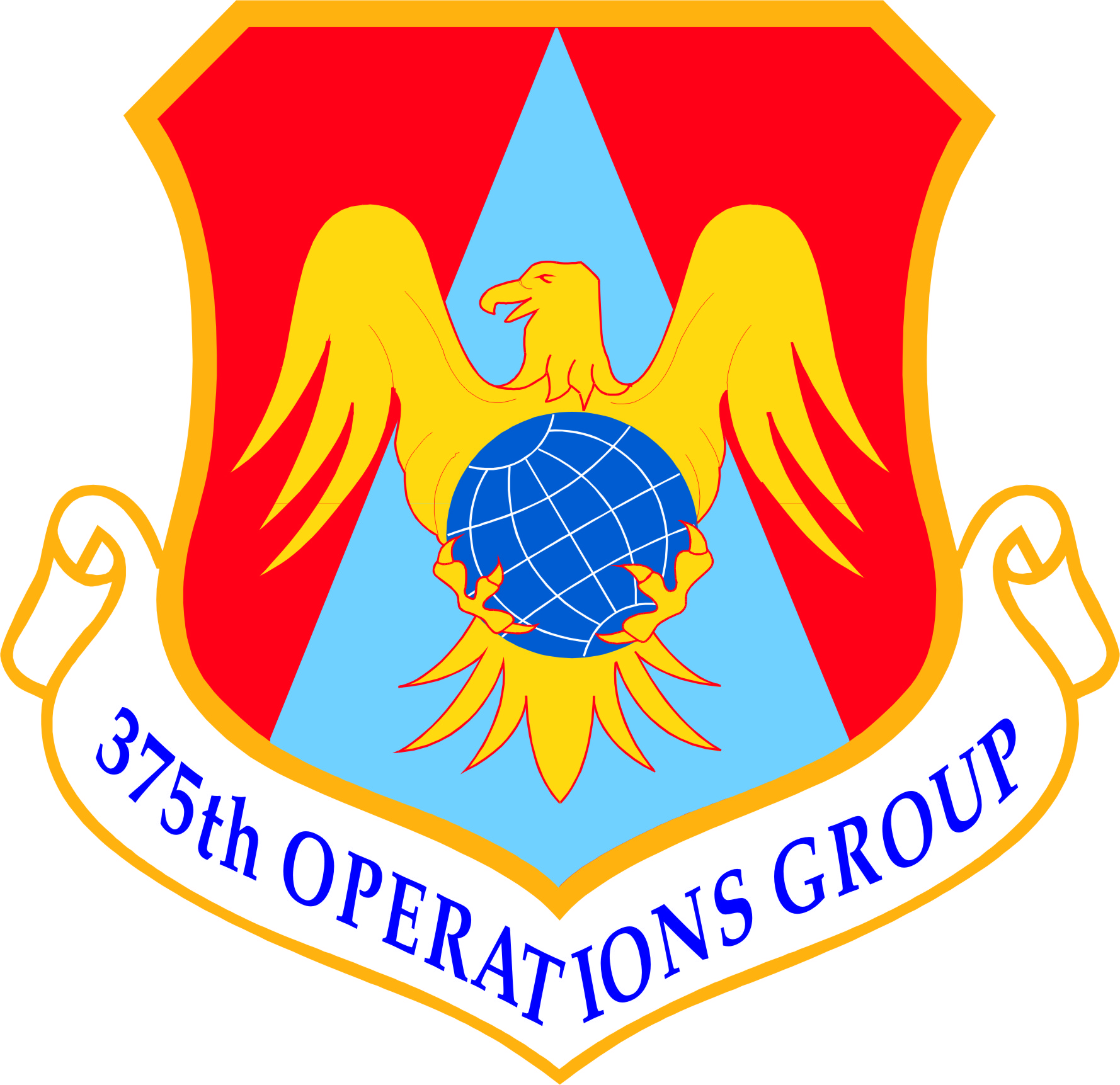
- Emblem of the 375th Operations Group
- Active: 1943–1946; 1947–1952; 1952–1957; 1991–present
- Country: United States
- Branch: United States Air Force

Commanders
- Current commander: Col Vincent Livie

Aircraft flown
- Transport: C-21, C-40, CL-600
- Tanker: KC-135

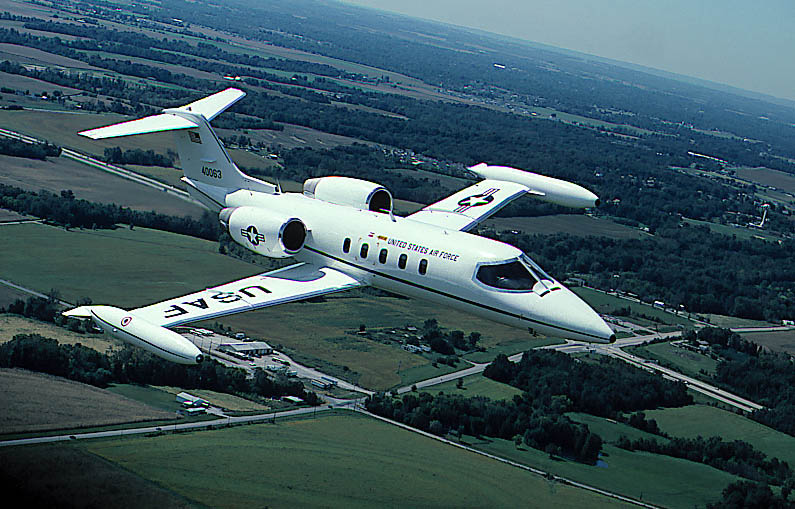
Gates Learjet C-21A. The aircraft is the military version of the Lear Jet 35A business jet

The 375th Operations Group (375 OG) is the operational flying component of the United States Air Force 375th Air Mobility Wing. It is stationed at Scott Air Force Base, Illinois.

The unit's World War II predecessor unit, the 375th Troop Carrier Group operated primarily in the Southwest Pacific Theater transporting men, supplies and ammunition to forward bases in New Guinea, New Britain and in the Solomon and Admiralty Islands. In 1943, the unit took part in the first airborne operation in the Southwest Pacific, dropping paratroops to seize enemy bases and cut overland supply lines in New Guinea. It was awarded the Philippine Presidential Unit Citation for its role in the liberation of the Philippines during 1944–1945. After the war, the unit served in the reserves and was elevated to active service during the Korean War. It returned to reserve duty until its inactivation in 1957; then again since 1991 after its reactivation.

== Overview ==
The 375th Operations Group is a diverse group of over 500 military, civilian, and contract personnel in six squadrons and one Detachment, located at three different locations within the U.S. The primary missions of the group is to provide aeromedical evacuation, aeromedical evacuation training, executive and operational support airlift, flight inspection, and air refueling of critical DoD assets. The Group’s medical personnel provide rapid aeromedical evacuation support for stateside and/or worldwide contingencies on six different mobility aircraft, in addition to conducting initial qualification training to aeromedical evacuation personnel. The group's two Total Force Integration squadrons conduct Executive Airlift with four AFRC-owned C-40C aircraft and air refueling with eight ANG-owned KC-135R aircraft. The group also provides CONUS/OCONUS operational support airlift to priority passengers from Scott AFB and one overseas deployed location with its 14 C-21A aircraft. In coordination with the DoD and FAA, the group is also responsible for the delivery of worldwide combatant commander contingency flight inspection jointly with the FAA. Finally, the group has responsibility for all airfield operations and management, including air traffic control of the shared-use Scott AFB/Mid America Airport called home by three flying wings.

- 458th Airlift Squadron C-21A

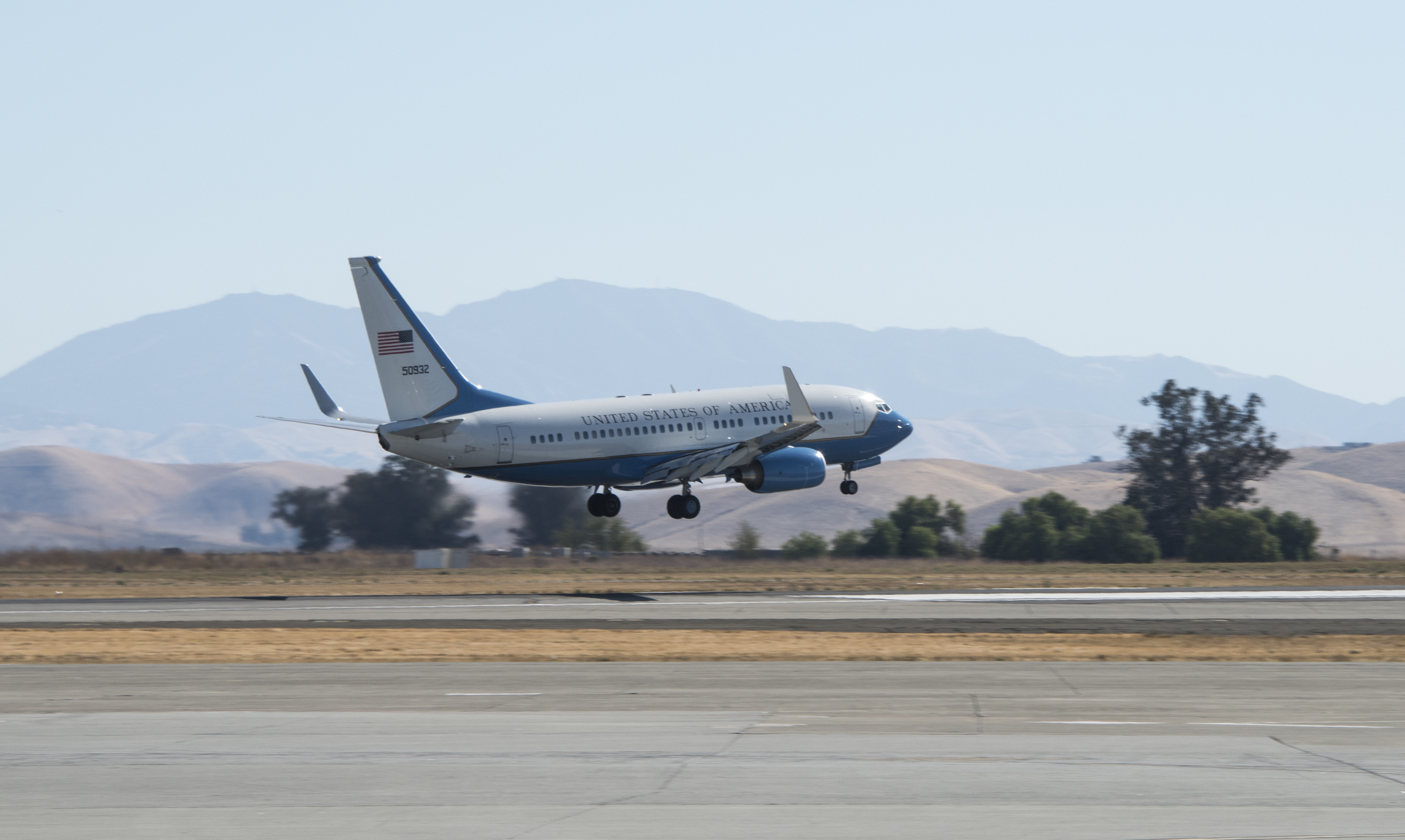
The Boeing C-40 Clipper is a military version of the Boeing 737 Next Generation used to transport cargo and passengers.

The 458th Airlift Squadrons collectively operate 14 C-21A aircraft out of Scott AFB, IL and one forward deployed location. They provide Airlift and Aeromedical Evacuation.

- 54th Airlift Squadron C-40C

The 54th Airlift Squadron partners with the 932d Airlift Wing as one of the first-ever AMC/AFRC active associate squadrons under the Total Force Integration model. The squadron flies four specially configured C-40C aircraft on Special Air Missions as directed by HQ USAF to transport members of the Presidential Cabinet and Congress, foreign heads of state, and other dignitaries.

- 375th Aeromedical Evacuation Squadron C-21A, C-17, C-130, and KC-135

The 375th Aeromedical Evacuation Squadron provides aeromedical evacuation. The unit trains, mobilizes, and deploys nearly 150 members to support the Theater Aeromedical Evacuation System conducting aeromedical evacuation missions aboard C-21A, C-17A, C-130E/H/J, KC-46 and KC-135R aircraft. The 375th AES provides command and control over the 775th Expeditionary Aeromedical Evacuation Flight. The 775th EAEF is composed of a command element, AE crews, and crew support at Scott as well as AE crews and crew support at three other operating locations at Joint Base Andrews, MD, Dover AFB, DE and Travis AFB, CA. The 375th AES most recently piloted the new Passenger Medical Augmentation Personnel (PMAP) concept during Operation ALLIES REFUGE and ALLIES WELCOME while coordinating and providing medical support for 13K refugees.

- 906th Air Refueling Squadron KC-135

The 906th Air Refueling Squadron is an Active Association in partnership with the Illinois National Guard's 126th Air Refueling Wing. The unit conducts air refueling missions on eight KC-135R aircraft.

- 375th Operations Support Squadron

The 375th Operations Support Squadron is the wing's executive agent for airfield operations. They provide weather services, air traffic control, and shared use airfield management, transient aircraft support, survival and aerospace ground equipment maintenance, life support, C-21A aircrew training and scheduling, and flight records management.

- 375th Aeromedical Evacuation Training Squadron C-21A, C-17, C-130, and KC-135

The 375th Aeromedical Evacuation Training Squadron provides initial qualification, flight instructor qualification, and requalification training for 31 total force aeromedical evacuation squadrons and command positions worldwide. Collocated with the U.S. Air Force School of Aerospace Medicine (USAFSAM) at Wright Patterson AFB, OH, the unit’s 39 members train and certify up to 200 aeromedical evacuation students annually.

- 375th Operations Group, Detachment 1 CL-604 and CL-605

The 375th Operations Group, Detachment 1 located at Mike Monroney Aeronautical Center Oklahoma City, Oklahoma operates the FAA's fleet of six Challenger 600-series aircraft. It is responsible for contingency flight inspection of airfield navigation and instrument landing systems, radars, and instrument procedures.

== History ==
For additional lineage and history, see 375th Air Mobility Wing

Initially trained for overseas duty and moved to the Pacific theater, June–July 1943. Operated from New Guinea and Biak, July 1943 – February 1945, transporting troops, supplies, and equipment to forward bases on New Guinea, New Britain, the Solomon Islands, and the Admiralty Islands. Flew armed B-17 Flying Fortress's for the more hazardous missions that involved landing on fields that were under enemy attack. Took part in the first airborne operation in the Southwest Pacific, seizing enemy bases and cutting supply lines at Nadzab, New Guinea, on 5 September 1943.

Moved to the Philippines in February 1945, and during the next few months most of its missions were supply flights to ground forces on Luzon and neighboring islands. Transported cargo to forces in the Ryukyus, June–July 1945. After the war, transferred troops from Luzon to the Ryukyus for staging to Japan. Also ferried liberated prisoners from Okinawa to Luzon. Moved to Japan in September 1945, flying supply missions and courier flights until inactivated.

Trained in the Reserve from August 1947 until the group was called to active duty in October 1950. After a period of intensive training, the group supplied airlift for troop movements throughout the United States. Reallotted to the Reserve for training from July 1952 – November 1957.

Conducted operational support, aeromedical, and training missions from December 1991.

== Lineage ==
- Established as 375th Troop Carrier Group on 12 November 1942

Activated on 18 November 1942
Inactivated on 25 March 1946

- Assigned and activated in the Reserve on 3 August 1947

Redesignated: 375th Troop Carrier Group, Medium on 10 May 1949
Ordered to active duty on 15 October 1950
Inactivated on 14 July 1952

- Activated in the Reserve on 14 July 1952

Inactivated on 16 November 1957

- Redesignated 375th Aeromedical Airlift Group on 31 July 1985 (Remained inactive)
- Redesignated 375th Operations Group, and activated on 1 December 1991.

=== Assignments ===
- I Troop Carrier Command, 18 November 1942
- 50th Troop Carrier Wing, 1 May 1943
- 54th Troop Carrier Wing, 12 July 1943 – 25 March 1946

Attached to: 310th Bombardment Wing, 24 March – 31 May 1945

- Eleventh Air Force, 3 August 1947
- 69th Troop Carrier Wing, 17 October 1947
- First Air Force, 1 July 1948
- Continental Air Command, 1 December 1948
- Ninth Air Force, 23 February 1949
- 375th Troop Carrier Wing, 27 June 1949 – 14 July 1952; 14 July 1952 – 16 November 1957
- 375th Airlift (later Air Mobility) Wing, 1 December 1991–present

=== Components ===
- 11th Aeromedical Airlift (later, 11th Airlift): 1 December 1991 – 30 September 2003
- 14th Fighter: 30 September 1947 – 27 June 1949
- 54th Airlift: 30 September 2004 – present
- 55th Troop Carrier: 18 November 1942 – 25 March 1946; 9 August 1947 – 16 November 1957
- 56th Troop Carrier: 18 November 1942 – 25 March 1946; 3 August 1947 – 16 November 1957
- 57th Troop Carrier: 18 November 1942 – 25 March 1946; 3 August 1947 – 1 April 1954
- 58th Troop Carrier: 18 November 1942 – 25 March 1946; 30 September 1947 – 3 October 1950
- 311th Airlift: 15 June 2005 – present
- 375th Flying Training: 1 December 1991 – 1 July 1994
- 457th Airlift: 1 December 1991 – 1 April 1993; 1 April 1997 – present
- 458th Airlift: 1 December 1991 – present
- 459th Airlift: 1 December 1991 – 1 April 1993.
- 906th Air Refueling: 2 October 2009 – present

=== Stations ===
- Bowman Field, Kentucky, 18 November 1942
- Sedalia Army Air Field, Missouri, 25 January 1943
- Laurinburg-Maxton Army Air Base, North Carolina, 6 May 1943
- Baer Field, Indiana, 2–17 June 1943
- Archerfield Airport, Brisbane, Australia, 13 July 1943
- Port Moresby Airfield Complex, New Guinea, 31 July 1943
- Dobodura Airfield Complex, New Guinea, 19 August 1943
- Port Moresby Airfield Complex, New Guinea, 19 December 1943
- Nadzab Airfield Complex, New Guinea, 22 April 1944
- Mokmer Airfield, Biak, Netherlands East Indies, 27 September 1944
- McGuire Field, San Jose, Mindoro, Philippines, 18 February 1945
- Porac Airfield, Luzon, Philippines, 20 May 1945
- Motobu Airfield, Okinawa, 31 July 1945
- Tachikawa AB, Japan, September 1945-25 March 1946
- Pittsburgh Airport, Pennsylvania, 3 August 1947
- Greenville AFB (later, Donaldson AFB), South Carolina, 16 October 1950 – 14 July 1952
- Pittsburgh Airport, Pennsylvania, 14 July 1952 – 16 November 1957
- Scott AFB, Illinois, 1 December 1991–present

=== Aircraft ===
- C-47, 1942–1946
- B-17, 1944
- C-46, 1944–1946; 1948–1950; 1952–1955
- C-82, 1950–1952
- C-45, 1951
- C-119, 1954–1957

C-118 prior to the * C-9,1991–2003

- C-12, 1991–1994
- C-21, 1991-present
- KC-135, 2009-present
