= 73rd Airlift Squadron =

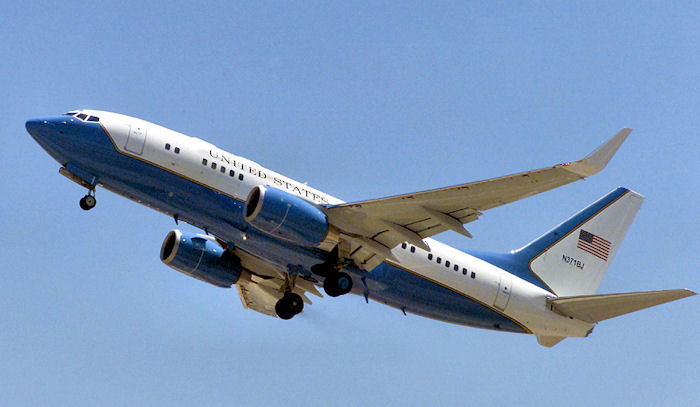
- Boeing C-40C as flown by the squadron
- Active: 9 February 1943 – 31 July 1946; 1 August 1947 – 24 March 1954; 8 June 1957 – present
- Country: United States
- Branch: United States Air Force
- Type: Distinguished Visitor Airlift
- Part of: Air Force Reserve Command; 22nd Air Force; 932nd Airlift Wing; 932nd Operations Group
- Garrison/HQ: Scott Air Force Base
- Engagements: Operation Overlord; Operation Market Garden; Battle of Bastogne
- Decorations: Distinguished Unit Citation; Air Force Outstanding Unit Award; French Croix de Guerre with Palm; French Fourragère; Republic of Vietnam Gallantry Cross with Palm

Commanders
- Current commander: Lt. Col. Brandon Lorton

Insignia
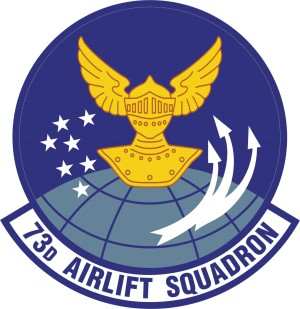
- 73rd Airlift Squadron emblem (approved 14 December 2007) (Note: Originally approved for the 73d Troop Carrier Squadron 30 September 1958. Reinstated in place of 1996 emblem. Robertson, Factsheet 73 Airlift Squadron)

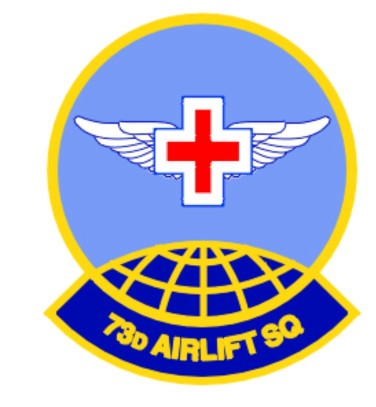
- 73rd Airlift Squadron emblem (31 July 1996)

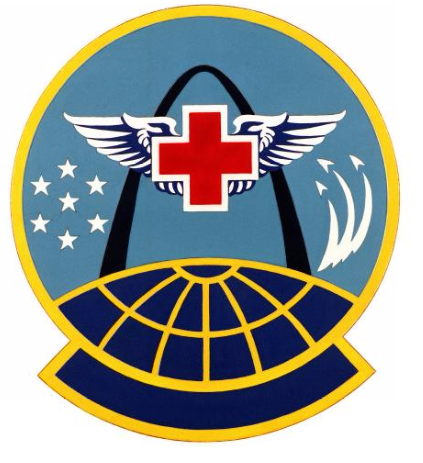
- 73rd Aeromedical Airlift Squadron emblem

The 73rd Airlift Squadron, sometimes written as 73d Airlift Squadron, is a United States Air Force Reserve squadron, assigned to the 932nd Operations Group, stationed at Scott Air Force Base, Illinois. Originally constituted as the 73rd Troop Carrier Squadron, the unit received a Distinguished Unit Citation and a French Croix de Guerre with Palm for its D-Day missions in Normandy in 1944. It was one of the units trained for space capsule recovery in the 1960s. The squadron was redesignated the 73rd Military Airlift Squadron in 1967, the 73rd Aeromedical Airlift Squadron in 1969, and finally the 73rd Airlift Squadron in 1994. It currently operates Boeing C-40C aircraft providing executive airlift for distinguished visitors and their staffs.

== History ==
Established in early 1943 as a C-47 Skytrain transport squadron under First Air Force, later trained under I Troop Carrier Command in the eastern United States. Deployed to England in late 1943, being assigned to Ninth Air Force in England, IX Troop Carrier Command to participate in the buildup of forces prior to the Allied landings in France during D-Day in June 1944.

Engaged in combat operations by dropping paratroops into Normandy on D-Day (6 June 1944) and releasing gliders with reinforcements on the following day. The unit received a Distinguished Unit Citation and a French citation for these missions.

After the Normandy invasion the squadron ferried supplies in the United Kingdom. The squadron also hauled food, clothing, medicine, gasoline, ordnance equipment, and other supplies to the front lines and evacuated patients to rear zone hospitals. It dropped paratroops near Nijmegen and towed gliders carrying reinforcements during the airborne attack on the Netherlands. In December, it participated in the Battle of the Bulge by releasing gliders with supplies for the 101st Airborne Division near Bastogne.

Moved to France in early 1945, and participated in the Western Allied invasion of Germany, participating in the air assault across the Rhine River in March 1945, each aircraft towed two gliders with troops of the 17th Airborne Division and released them near Wesel.

Returned to the United States in August 1945, becoming a domestic troop carrier squadron for Continental Air Forces, inactivated July 1946.

It transported personnel, equipment, and supplies and airdropped airborne troops and equipment from, 1957–1967. The squadron conducted long range movement of troops, cargo, and equipment from 1965 to 1969 and trained for space capsule recovery from, 1961–1969. It augmented the active duty 375th Airlift Wing in operating the aeromedical airlift system from, 1969–2005. Since 2005 the 73d has conducted executive airlift with the 54th Airlift Squadron, an Active-Associate Squadron under TFA (Total Force Association).

=== Operations and decorations ===
- Combat Operations. Airborne assaults on Normandy, the Netherlands, and Germany; relief of Bastogne; transportation of passengers and cargo in ETO during World War II. Transported personnel, equipment and supplies and airdropped airborne troops and equipment, 1957–1967; long range movement of troops, cargo, and equipment, 1965–1969; and trained for space capsule recovery, 1961–1969.
- Campaigns. World War II: Normandy; Northern France; Rhineland; Ardennes-Alsace; Central Europe
- Decorations. Distinguished Unit Citation: France, 6-7 Jun 1944. Air Force Outstanding Unit Awards: 20 Aug 1969 – 30 Jun 1971; 1 Jan 1972 – 31 Mar 1973; 24 Jul 1975 – 23 Jul 1977; 29 Sep 1980 – 30 Jun 1982; 1 Jun 1986 – 31 Jul 1988; 1 Jan 1993 – 1 Aug 1994. French Croix de Guerre with Palm: 6–7 Jun 1944; 20–28 Aug 1944. French Fourragere. Republic of Vietnam Gallantry Cross with Palm: 1 Apr 1967 – 24 Jul 1969.

=== Lineage ===
- Constituted as the 73d Troop Carrier Squadron on 30 January 1943

Activated on 9 February 1943
Inactivated on 31 July 1946

- Activated in the Reserve on 1 August 1947

Re-designated 73d Troop Carrier Squadron, Medium on 1 July 1949
Ordered to Active Service on 1 May 1951
Inactivated on 1 February 1953

- Activated in the Reserve on 1 February 1953

Inactivated on 24 March 1954

- Activated in the Reserve on 8 June 1957

Ordered to Active Service on 28 October 1962
Relieved from Active Duty on 28 November 1962

- Redesignated 73d Military Airlift Squadron on 1 April 1967

Redesignated 73d Aeromedical Airlift Squadron (Associate) on 25 July 1969
Redesignated 73d Airlift Squadron on 1 October 1994

=== Assignments ===
- 434th Troop Carrier Group, 9 Feb 1943 – 31 Jul 1946; 1 August 1947
- 436th Troop Carrier Group, 1 July 1948
- 434th Troop Carrier Group, 1 July 1949 – 1 February 1953
- 434th Troop Carrier Group, 1 February 1953 – 24 March 1954
- 434th Troop Carrier Group, 8 June 1957
- 434th Troop Carrier Wing, 14 April 1959
- 932d Troop Carrier (later, 932 Military Airlift; 932 Aeromedical Airlift) Group, 11 February 1963
- 932d Operations Group, 1 August 1992 – present

=== Stations ===
- Alliance Army Air Field, Nebraska, 9 February 1943
- Baer Field, Indiana, 4–28 Sep 1943
- RAF Fulbeck (AAF-488), England, Oct 1943
- RAF Welford (AAF-474), England, Nov 1943
- RAF Fulbeck (AAF-488), England, 10 January 1944
- RAF Aldermaston (AAF-467), England, 3 March 1944
- Mourmelon-le-Grand Airfield (A-80), France, Feb–Jun 1945
- Baer Field, Indiana, 5 August 1945
- Alliance Army Air Field, Nebraska, 15 September 1945
- George Army Airfield, Illinois, 11 October 1945
- Greenville Air Force Base, South Carolina, 2 Feb-31 Jul 1946
- Lunken Airport, Ohio, 1 August 1947
- Atterbury AFB, Indiana, 1 July 1949
- Lawson AFB, Georgia, 23 Jan 1952 – 1 Feb 1953
- Atterbury AFB, Indiana, 1 Feb 1953 – 24 Mar 1954
- Dress Memorial Airport, Indiana, 8 June 1957
- Scott AFB, Illinois, 16 Nov 1957– present

=== Aircraft ===
- C-47 Skytrain (1943–1946, 1949)
- CG-4 Waco (1943–1945)
- C-46 Commando (1945–1946, 1949–1953, 1957)
- T-11 Kansan (1947–1952, 1953)
- T-7 Navigator (1947–1952)
- T-6 Texan (1953)
- C-45 Expeditor (1953–1954)
- C-119 Flying Boxcar (1957–1967)
- C-124 Globemaster II (1967–1969)
- McDonnell Douglas C-9A (1969–2005)
- McDonnell Douglas VC-9C (2005–2011)
- C-40C Clipper (2007 – present)
