= 54th Airlift Squadron =

54th Airlift Squadron

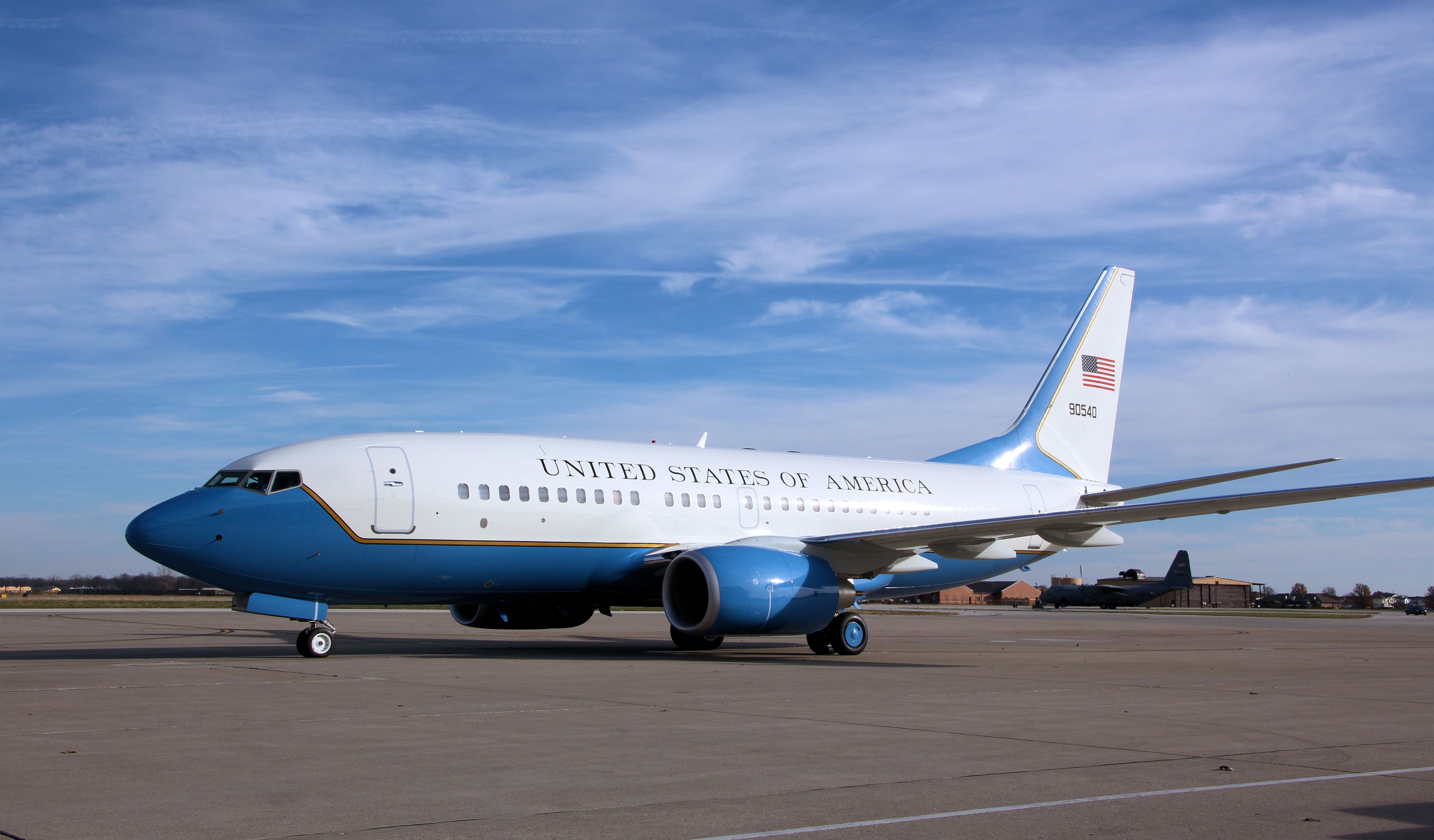
- C-40 Clipper at Scott Air Force Base (Note: Aircraft is Boeing C-40C Clipper serial 09-0540.)
- Active: 1917–1919; 1927–1931; 1931–1936; 1939–1942; 1942–1943; 1967–1972; 1993–present
- Country: United States
- Branch: United States Air Force
- Role: Airlift
- Part of: Air Mobility Command
- Garrison/HQ: Scott Air Force Base
- Motto: Eyes of the Cat (1967-1972) Wings of Knowledge(after 1993) General Delivery (2004-present)
- Engagements: World War I Theater of Operations; American Theater of World War II; Vietnam War
- Decorations: Presidential Unit Citation; Air Force Outstanding Unit Award with Combat "V" Device; Air Force Outstanding Unit Award; Republic of Vietnam Gallantry Cross with Palm

Commanders
- Notable commanders: Major General John W. Persons

Insignia
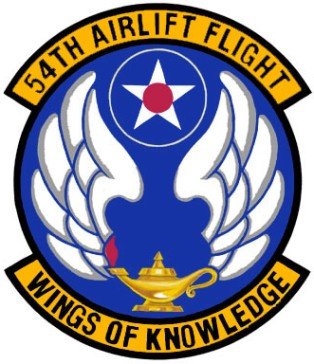
- 54th Airlift Squadron emblem (Note: Approved 30 November 1993.)

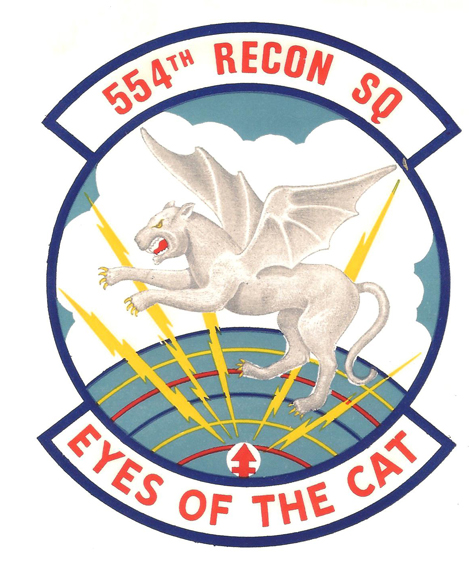
- 554th Reconnaissance Squadron emblem

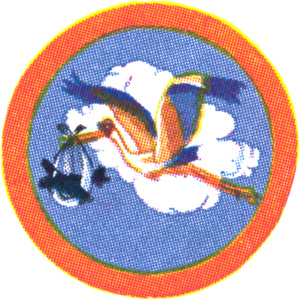
- 54th Transport Squadron emblem

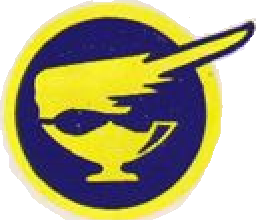
- 54th Bombardment Squadron emblem (Note: Approved 10 October 1931. Description: On a blue disc a lap of knowledge with the f[l]ame in the form of a sinister wing, displayed within a border, all gold.)

The 54th Airlift Squadron is a United States Air Force squadron stationed at Scott Air Force Base, Illinois. The squadron is an active duty associate unit aiding the 932d Airlift Wing in performance of its airlift mission. The first predecessor of the squadron was formed in August 1917 as the 54th Aero Squadron and served in France during World War II. In 1936, this unit was consolidated with the 54th School Squadron, a pilot training unit that became the 54th Bombardment Squadron, which became a demonstration unit for the Air Corps Tactical School, and later a test and evaluation unit for medium bomber aircraft and tactics.

In 1985, this squadron was consolidated with the 54th Transport Squadron, an Air Transport Command unit that was involved with the movement of aircraft in the Caribbean during World War II, and the 554th Reconnaissance Squadron, which conducted surveillance of the Ho Chi Minh Trail during the Vietnam War.

In 1993, the consolidated unit became the 54th Airlift Flight and has conducted operational support airlift since then. In 2005, the flight was expanded to squadron size.

== Mission ==
The squadron mission is to provide air mobility operations through its Total Force Integration partnerships with the Air Force Reserve in flying Boeing C-40 Clipper aircraft.

== History ==
=== World War I ===
The first predecessor of the squadron was formed in August 1917 as the 54th Aero Squadron. The unit was organized primarily from recruits in the Columbus, Ohio area at Kelly Field, Texas. After a month of indoctrination training at Kelly, it moved to the Aviation Concentration Center at Hazelhurst Field, Long Island, New York, where it arrived on 21 September. At Hazelhurst, the squadron was outfitted for overseas duty, sailing on the Cunard Liner RMS Pannonia (1902) on 13 October with seven other squadrons, Arriving in Belfast, Ireland on the 28th. The following day, the squadron disembarked at Liverpool for a train trip to Southampton. The squadron arrived at Le Havre, France on 1 November.

After some rest in Le Havre, the squadron then boarded a French train for Issoudun Aerodrome in central France. Its mission was to assist in the construction of a large training aerodrome, designated the Third Aviation Instruction Center. The squadron erected wooden barracks, dug ditches for water and sewer lines as well as electricity and telephones. It was redesignated as the 466th Aero Squadron on 1 February 1918 when Aero Squadrons engaging in construction work were renumbered in the 400s.

On 10 March 1918, with the work largely completed at Issodun, the squadron was moved to Air Service Production Center No. 2 at Romorantin Aerodrome. There, the squadron assisted in the same type of construction it performed at Issodun.

By 1 April 1918, the facility was ready for use as an active Air Service training camp. As part of the permanent garrison at Romorantin, the squadron's mission was to assemble aircraft, work in the engineering department, maintain the facilitates of the base, operate the quartermaster's office and other administrative departments of the production center. It continued this work until the armistice in November 1918.

In late December 1918, the squadron was ordered to be demobilized by the Commanding General, Services of Supply, American Expeditionary Forces. It moved to a staging area near Brest where it awaited transportation back to the United States. The squadron arrived at Garden City, New York, at the end of January 1919 where it was demobilized and its men returned to civilian life.

=== Flying training ===
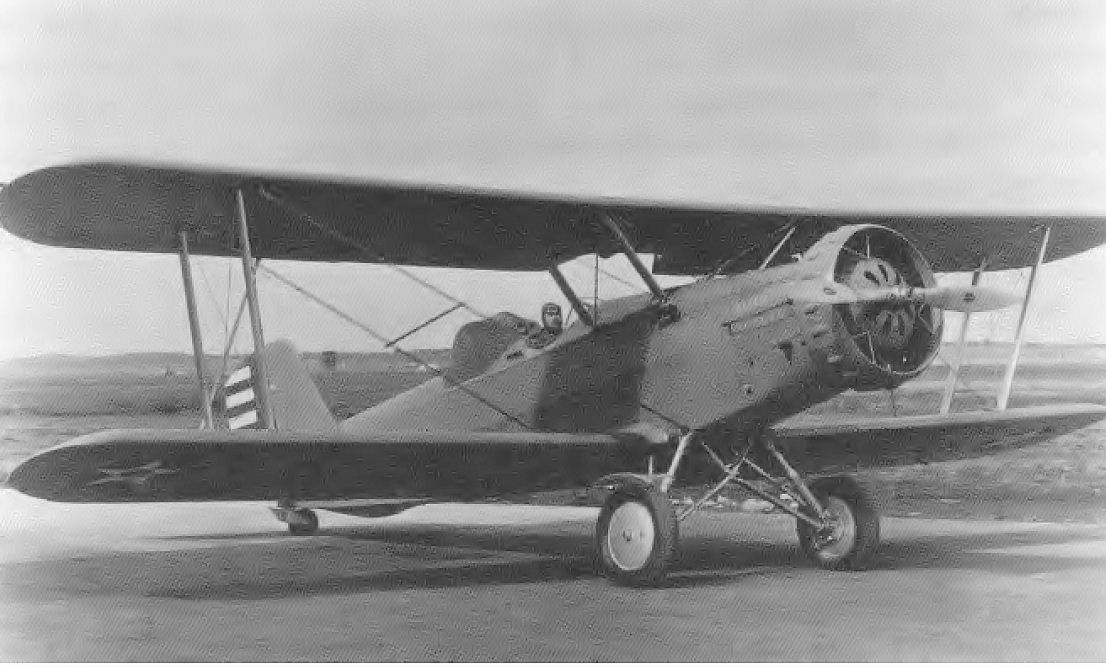
Douglas BT-2 trainer

The second predecessor of the 54th was the 54th School Squadron, which was activated in July 1927 at March Field, California. The squadron conducted flying training with Douglas BT-2s until July 1931, when the Air Corps concentrated its pilot training at fields in the San Antonio, Texas area and inactivated the squadron and March Field.

=== Air Corps Tactical School ===
The squadron was activated again a little more than three months later at Maxwell Field, Alabama, where it was assigned to the Air Corps Tactical School. The squadron permitted students at the school to maintain flying proficiency while attending the school. In March 1935, the squadron was redesignated the 54th Bombardment Squadron. It was inactivated in September 1936. The following month, it was consolidated with the 466th Aero Squadron, although it remained in inactive status for the next three years.

=== Proving ground unit ===
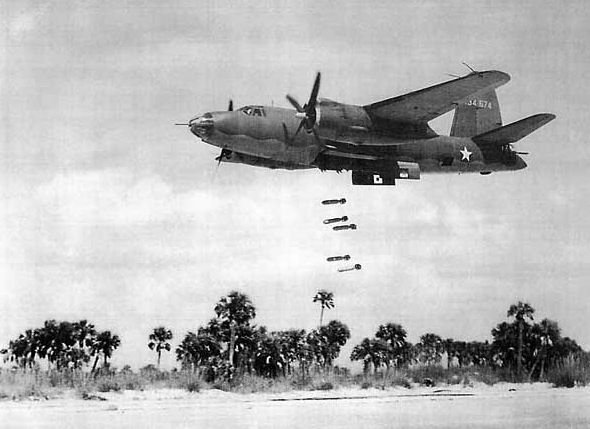
Martin B-26 Marauder on a bomb training run at Eglin Field (Note: Aircraft is Martin B-26C Marauder serial 41-34674. This aircraft was the second B-26C off the B-26 production line at Omaha, Nebraska.)

The squadron was reactivated at Maxwell in October 1939 and assigned to the 23d Composite Group. The group's mission was to demonstrate current tactics to students attending the Air Corps Tactical School, with the understanding that the group would also assume the demonstration and exhibition function that was being carried out by combat units of Air Force Combat Command. The group was also assigned the mission of performing tactical service tests of aircraft and other equipment; developing and testing new air tactics; and demonstrating these new tactics to the service schools of the other branches of the United States Army, to General Headquarters, and at Air Corps stations. The squadron was initially the group's bomber unit, although two months after it was activated, it added "Medium" to its designation when the 24th Attack-Bombardment Squadron was added to the 23d Group as its attack and dive bomber unit.

The squadron moved to Orlando Army Air Base, Florida the following year, and to Eglin Field on 1 July 1941. When the Japanese attacked Pearl Harbor, the squadron was equipped with various aircraft types at Eglin. The squadron's mission focused on developing and demonstrating tactics and doctrine. After moving to Eglin it also conducted testing of experimental weapons, including the Martin B-26 Marauder. On 1 May 1942, the squadron and the group's other squadrons were disbanded as the group focused on weapons development rather than tactics.

=== Ferrying and airlift ===
The third predecessor of the squadron was organized at Homestead Army Air Base, Florida in September 1942 as the 54th Ferrying Squadron. For the next year, the squadron, later redesignated the 54th Transport Squadron, ferried aircraft from Florida to various locations in the Caribbean. In the fall of 1943, Air Transport Command reorganized its operations at Homestead, replacing its overseas ferrying squadrons there with Station 8, Caribbean Wing, Air Transport Command and the squadron was disbanded on 7 November.

=== Reconnaissance in Southeast Asia ===
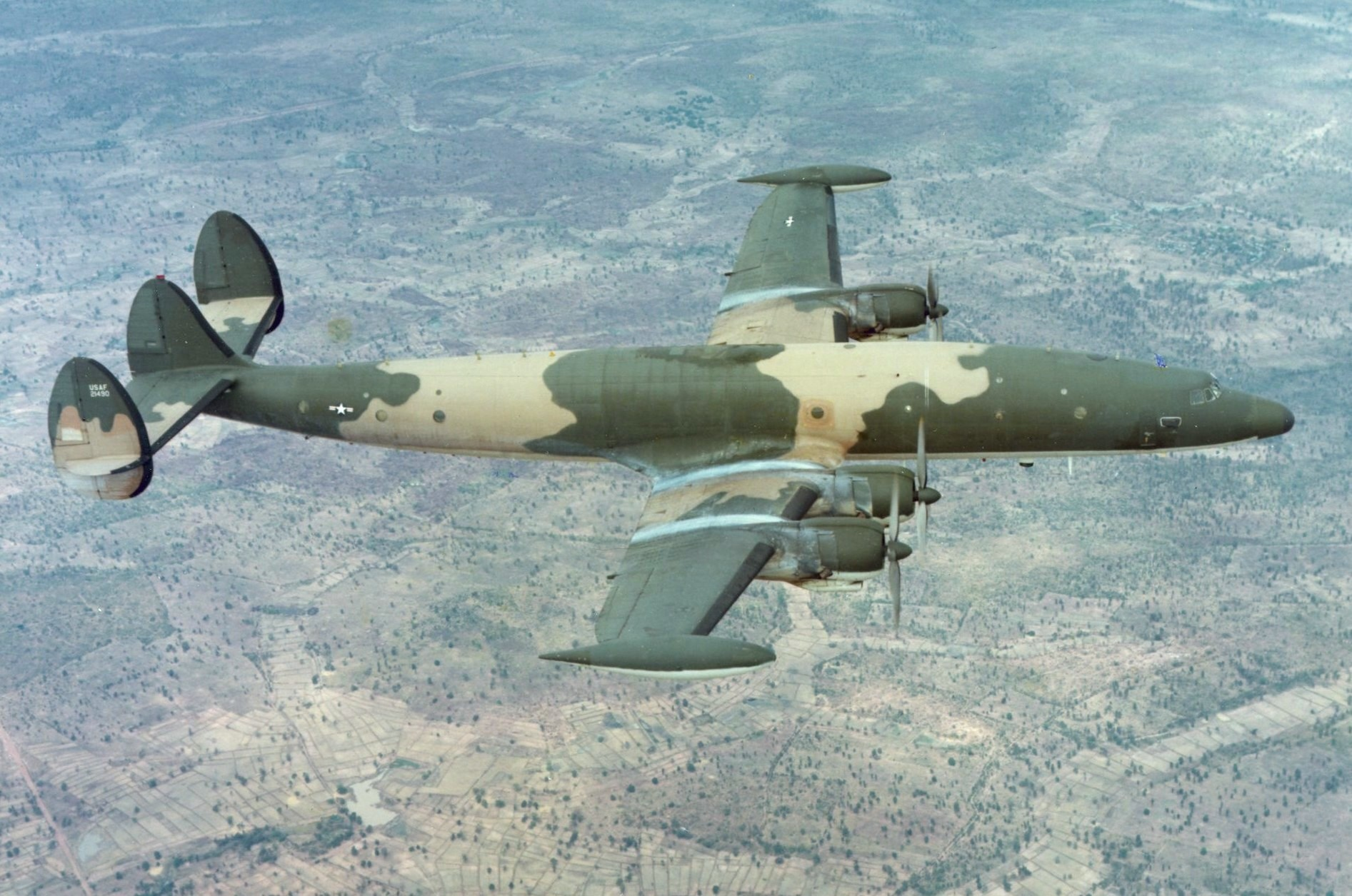
Lockheed EC-121R in Southeast Asia

The last predecessor of the squadron is the 554th Reconnaissance Squadron, which was activated at Otis Air Force Base, Massachusetts in February 1957. At Otis it began to train with Lockheed C-121G Constellations as it equipped with Lockheed EC-121R Batcats. Once training was completed, the squadron moved to Korat Royal Thai Air Force Base, Thailand to begin operations monitoring movement on the Ho Chi Minh Trail in Laos.

The squadron's planes monitored information provided by sensors on the ground that had been delivered by other aircraft or special forces. These included Air Delivered Seismic Intrusion Detectors, which picked up vibrations in the earth caused by vehicle traffic and transmitted them to the aircraft. Sequential transmissions by these sensors permitted analysis of vehicle speed and route. These were combined with sound detectors that helped determine what type of vehicle was operating. The sensor information was retransmitted by the squadron's aircraft to the infiltration surveillance center located at Nakhon Phanom Royal Thai Air Force Base (NKP) for Analysis.

In October 1970, the squadron replaced its C-121s with the smaller Beechcraft QU-22. In December 1970, the squadron's parent 553d Reconnaissance Wing was inactivated and the squadron moved on paper to NKP, where it took over the operations of what had been Detachment 1 of the 553d Wing at NKP and was assigned to the 56th Special Operations Wing. The squadron inactivated at the end of September 1972.

In September 1985, the 554th was consolidated with the 54th Bombardment Squadron and the 54th Transport Squadron as the 554th Tactical Intelligence Squadron. However, the consolidated squadron was never active under that name.

=== Return to airlift mission ===
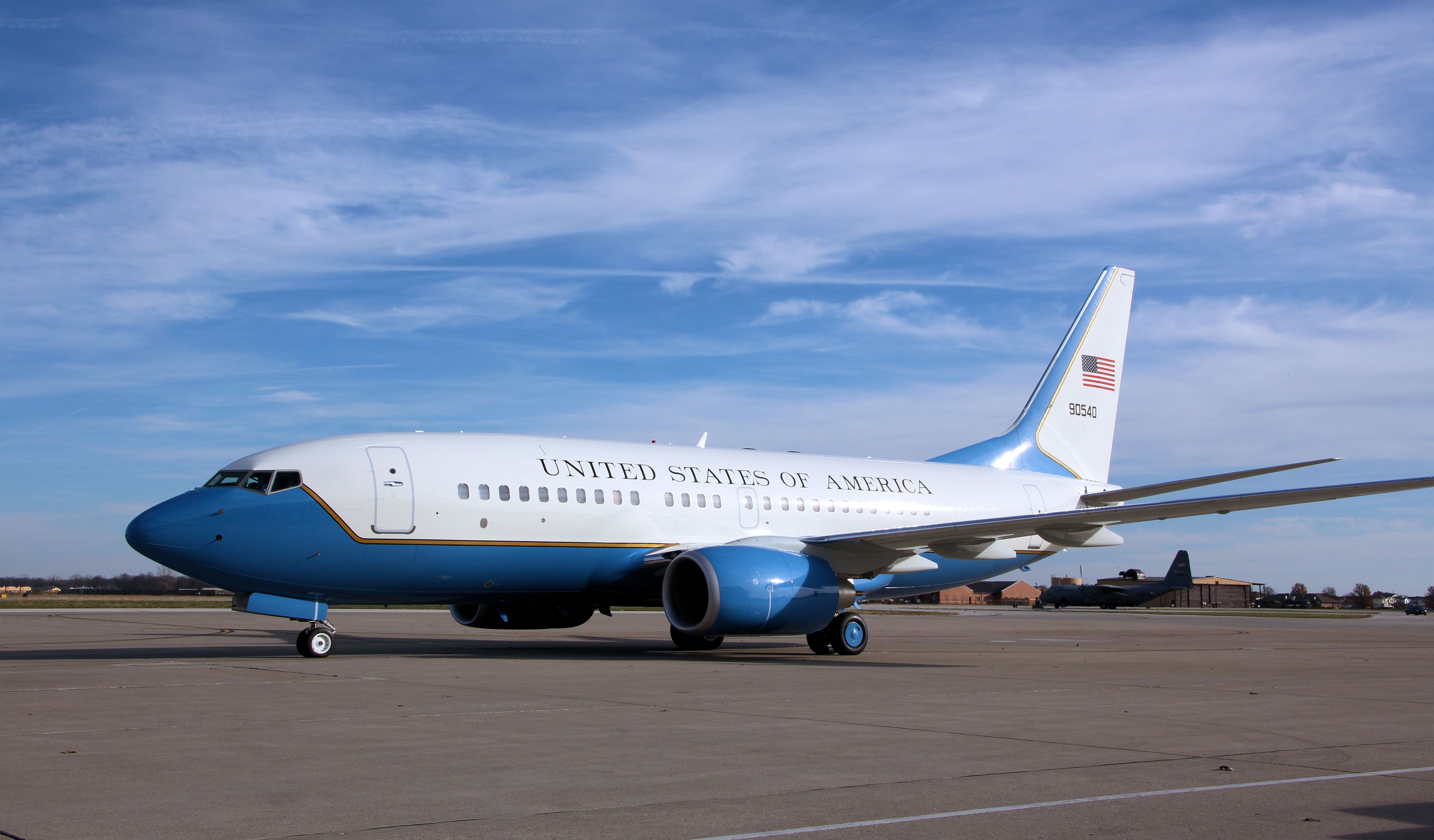
C-40C Clipper 09-0540

The squadron was never active as an intelligence unit, but was redesignated the 54th Airlift Flight and returned to Maxwell Air Force Base, on 1 April 1993. It provided airlift for senior officers and others stationed at Maxwell. In April 1997, Air Mobility Command centralized management of this type of airlift under the 375th Air Mobility Wing. As a result of this reorganization, the flight moved to Wright-Patterson Air Force Base, Ohio, where it remained until 2004. In September of that year, the 54th moved to Scott Air Force Base, Illinois and became a squadron once again as the 54th Airlift Squadron. It inactivated at Scott on the last day of 2006.

The squadron was again activated in March 2007 at Scott Air Force Base, Illinois. The squadron operates as a Total Force Associate unit aiding the 932d Airlift Wing mission. The 54th belongs administratively to the 375th Operations Group at Scott. However, it operates under the 932d Operations Group alongside the reserve 73d Airlift Squadron. With this relationship the 73d Airlift Squadron owns the aircraft, and the 54th Airlift Squadron provides aircrew members flying together as one mixed crew. The primary aircraft currently operated is the Boeing C-40 Clipper. The primary mission of the 54th Airlift Squadron is safe, comfortable, and reliable transportation of our nation's senior leaders.

== Lineage ==
54th Aero Squadron

- Organized as the 54th Aero Squadron on 8 August 1917

Redesignated 466th Aero Squadron (Construction) on 1 February 1918
Demobilized on 10 February 1919

- Reconstituted and consolidated with the 54th School Squadron as the 54th School Squadron on 14 October 1936

54th Bombardment Squadron

- Constituted as the 54th School Squadron on 6 February 1923

Activated on 31 July 1927
Inactivated on 30 April 1931

- Activated on 15 July 1931

Redesignated 54th Bombardment Squadron on 1 March 1935
Inactivated on 1 September 1936
Consolidated with the 466th Aero Squadron on 14 October 1936

- Activated on 1 October 1939

Redesignated 54th Bombardment Squadron (Medium) on 6 December 1939
Disbanded on 1 May 1942

- Reconstituted on 19 September 1985 and consolidated with the 54th Transport Squadron and the 554th Reconnaissance Squadron as the 554th Tactical Intelligence Squadron

54th Transport Squadron

- Constituted on 30 August 1942 as the 54th Ferrying Squadron

Activated on 16 September 1942
Redesignated 54th Transport Squadron on 19 March 1943

- Disbanded on 7 November 1943
- Reconstituted on 19 September 1985 and consolidated with the 54th Bombardment Squadron and the 554th Reconnaissance Squadron as the 554th Tactical Intelligence Squadron

54th Airlift Squadron

- Constituted as the 554th Reconnaissance Squadron and activated on 9 February 1967 (not organized)

Organized on 25 February 1967
inactivated on 30 September 1972

- Consolidated with the 54th Bombardment Squadron and the 54th Transport Squadron as the 554th Tactical Intelligence Squadronon 19 September 1985
- Redesignated 54th Airlift Flight and activated on 1 April 1993

Redesignated 54th Airlift Squadron on 30 September 2004
Inactivated on 31 December 2006

- Activated on 19 March 2007

=== Assignments ===
- Post Headquarters, Kelly Field, 8 August 1917
- Garden City Aviation General Supply Depot & Concentration Camp, 21 September–October 1917
- Third Aviation Instruction Center, November 1917
- Air Service Production Center No. 2, c. 19 March–December 1918
- Services of Supply, American Expeditionary Force, December 1918 – c. 12 January 1919
- Garden City Aviation General Supply Depot & Concentration Camp, c. 31 January – 10 February 1919
- 13th School Group, 31 July 1927 – 30 April 1931
- Air Corps Tactical School, 15 July 1931
- 2d Bombardment Group (attached to Air Corps Tactical School), 1 March 1935 – 1 September 1936
- 23d Composite Group (later Air Corps Proving Ground Detachment, Air Forces Proving Ground Group), 1 October 1939 – 1 May 1942
- 15th Ferrying Group (later 15th Transport Group), 16 September 1942 – 7 November 1943
- Air Defense Command, 9 February 1967 (not organized)
- 553d Reconnaissance Wing, 25 February 1967
- 56th Special Operations Wing, 15 December 1970 – 30 September 1972
- 502d Logistics and Operations Group, 1 April 1993
- 502d Operations Squadron, 17 June 1994
- 42 Operations Squadron, 1 October 1994
- 457th Airlift Squadron, c. 1 April 1997
- 375th Operations Group, c. 30 September 2004 – 31 December 2006
- 375th Operations Group, 19 March 2007 – present

=== Stations ===
- Kelly Field, Texas, 8 August 1917
- Hazelhurst Field, Garden City, New York, 21 September–October 1917
- Issoudun Aerodrome, France, 4 November 1917
- Romorantin Aerodrome, France, 19 March 1918
- Brest, France, 28 December 1918 – c. 12 January 1919
- Aviation Concentration Center, Garden City, New York, c. 31 January – 10 February 1919
- March Field, California, 31 July 1927 – 30 April 1931
- Maxwell Field, Alabama, 15 July 1931 – 1 September 1936
- Maxwell Field, Alabama, 1 October 1939
- Orlando Army Air Base, Florida, 2 September 1940
- Eglin Field, Florida, 29 June 1941 – 1 May 1942.
- Homestead Army Air Base, Florida, 16 September 1942 – 7 November 1943
- Otis Air Force Base, Massachusettd, 25 February 1967
- Korat Royal Thai Air Force Base, Thailand, 31 October 1967
- Nakhon Phanom Royal Thai Air Force Base, Thailand, 15 December 1970 – 30 September 1972
- Maxwell Air Force Base, Alabama, 1 April 1993
- Wright-Patterson Air Force Base, Ohio, 1 April 1997
- Scott Air Force Base, Illinois, 30 September 2004 – 31 December 2006, 19 March 2007 – present

=== Aircraft ===
- Douglas BT-2 (1927-1931)
- Apparently Dayton-Wright DH-4 (1927-1931)
- Apparently Consolidated PT-3 (1927-1931)
- Apparently Curtiss A-3 Falcon (1931-1935)
- Apparently Douglas O-25 (1931-19350
- Keystone B-4 (1935-1936)
- Douglas B-18 Bolo (1940-1942)
- Douglas B-23 Dragon (1940-1942)
- Martin B-26 Marauder (tested during 1939–1942)
- Curtiss A-12 Shrike (tested during 1939–1942)
- Martin B-12 (tested during 1939–1942)
- Boeing B-17 Flying Fortress (tested during 1939–1942)
- North American B-25 Mitchell (tested during 1939–1942)
- Douglas O-38 (tested during 1939–1942)
- Grumman OA-9 Goose (tested during 1939–1942)
- Consolidated PB-2 (tested during 1939–1942)
- PT-14 (tested during 1939–1942)
- Stearman PT-17 (tested during 1939–1942)
- Lockheed EC-121 Batcat (1967-1970)
- Beechcraft QU-22 (1970-1972)
- Learjet C-21 (1993-2006)
- McDonnell Douglas C-9 Skytrain II (2010-2011)
- Boeing C-40 Clipper (2007–present)

=== Awards and campaigns ===
Award streamer	Award	Dates	Notes
	Presidential Unit Citation	1 April 1972–30 September 1972	Southeast Asia, 554th Reconnaissance Squadron
	Air Force Outstanding Unit Award with Combat "V" Device	1 April 1967–31 May 1968	554th Reconnaissance Squadron
	Air Force Outstanding Unit Award with Combat "V" Device	1 July 1968–15 April 1969	554th Reconnaissance Squadron
	Air Force Outstanding Unit Award with Combat "V" Device	15 December 1970–30 November 1971	554th Reconnaissance Squadron
	Air Force Outstanding Unit Award with Combat "V" Device	1 December 1971–29 February 1972	554th Reconnaissance Squadron
	Air Force Outstanding Unit Award	1 June 1992–30 May 1994	54th Airlift Flight
	Air Force Outstanding Unit Award	1 July 1995–30 June 1996	54th Airlift Flight
	Air Force Outstanding Unit Award	1 July 1996–30 June 1997	54th Airlift Flight
	Air Force Outstanding Unit Award	1 July 1998–30 June 2000	54th Airlift Flight
	Air Force Outstanding Unit Award	1 June 2006–31 May 2008	54th Airlift Squadron
	Vietnamese Gallantry Cross with Palm	29 November 1967–30 September 1972	554th Reconnaissance Squadron

Campaign Streamer	Campaign	Dates	Notes
	Theater of Operations	16 November 1917–1919	54th Aero Squadron (later 466th Aero Squadron)
	American Theater without inscription	7 December 1941–1 May 1942	54th Bombardment Squadron
	Vietnam Air Offensive, Phase II	31 October 1967–31 March 1968	554th Reconnaissance Squadron
	Vietnam Air/Ground	22 January 1968–7 July 1968	554th Reconnaissance Squadron
	Vietnam Air Offensive, Phase III	1 April 1968–31 October 1968	554th Reconnaissance Squadron
	Vietnam Air Offensive, Phase IV	1 November 1968–22 February 1969	554th Reconnaissance Squadron
	Tet 1969/Counteroffensive	23 February 1969–8 June 1969	554th Reconnaissance Squadron
	Vietnam Summer-Fall 1969	9 June 1969–31 October 1969	554th Reconnaissance Squadron
	Vietnam Winter-Spring 1970	3 November 1969–30 April 1970	554th Reconnaissance Squadron
	Sanctuary Counteroffensive	1 May 1970–30 June 1970	554th Reconnaissance Squadron
	Southwest Monsoon	1 July 1970–30 November 1970	554th Reconnaissance Squadron
	Commando Hunt V	1 December 1970–14 May 1971	554th Reconnaissance Squadron
	Commando Hunt VI	15 May 1971–31 July 1971	554th Reconnaissance Squadron
	Commando Hunt VII	1 November 1971–29 March 1972	554th Reconnaissance Squadron
	Vietnam Ceasefire Campaign	29 March 1972–28 January 1973	554th Reconnaissance Squadron

== See also ==
- List of American Aero Squadrons
- List of United States Air Force airlift squadrons
- List of United States Air Force reconnaissance squadrons
- B-17 Flying Fortress units of the United States Army Air Forces
- List of Martin B-26 Marauder operators
