= 932nd Airlift Wing =

932nd Airlift Wing

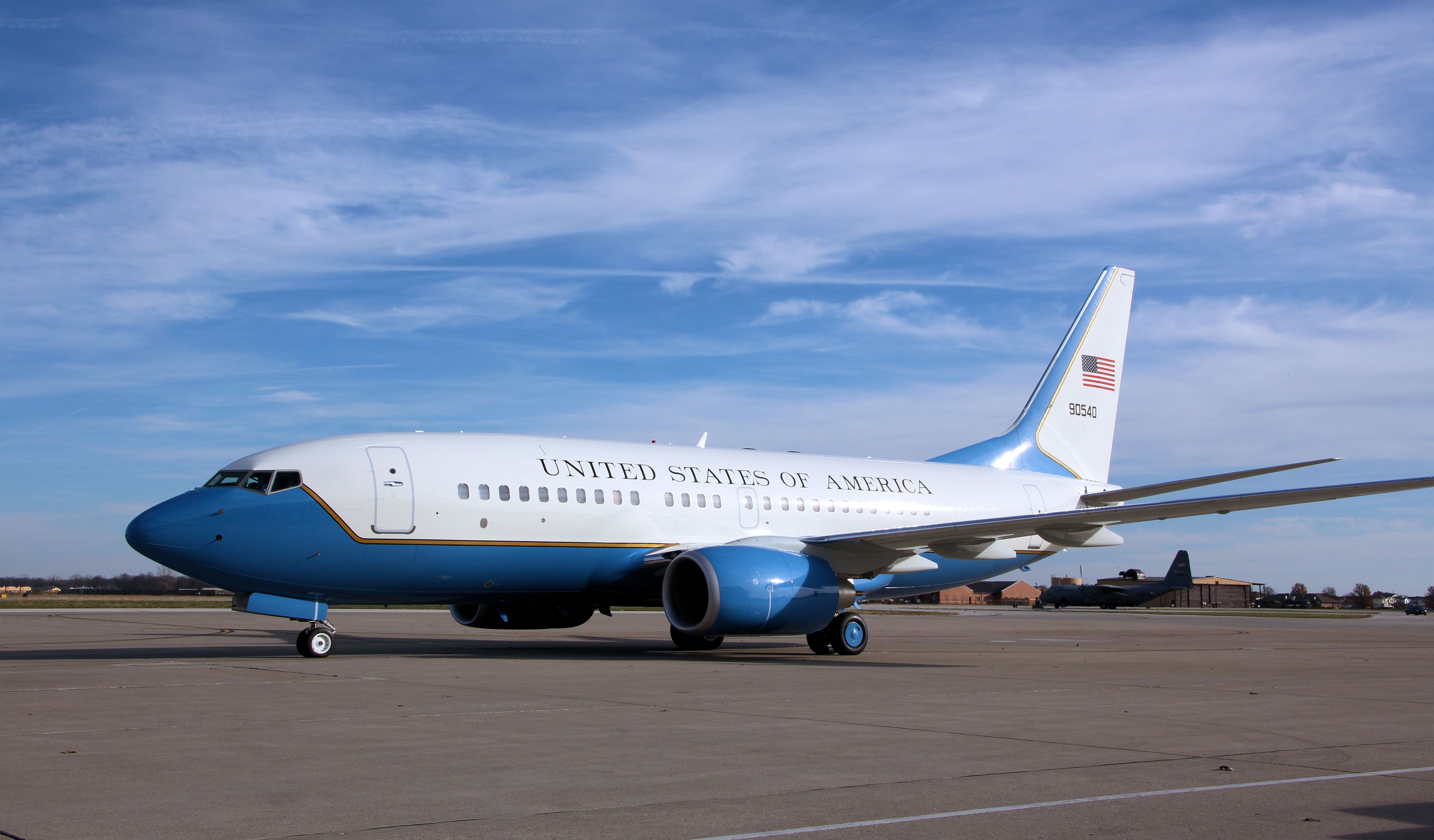
- 932nd Airlift Wing C-40C Clipper (Note: Aircraft is Boeing C-40C Clipper, serial 09-0540.)
- Active: 1963–present
- Country: United States
- Branch: United States Air Force
- Type: Wing
- Role: Distinguished visitor airlift
- Size: 1,100 Personnel
- Part of: Air Force Reserve Command
- Garrison/HQ: Scott Air Force Base, Illinois
- Nickname: "The Gateway Wing"
- Decorations: Air Force Outstanding Unit Award; Republic of Vietnam Gallantry Cross with Palm

Commanders
- Current commander: Colonel Jeffrey Smith
- Command Chief: Command Chief Master Sergeant Andrea Young

Insignia
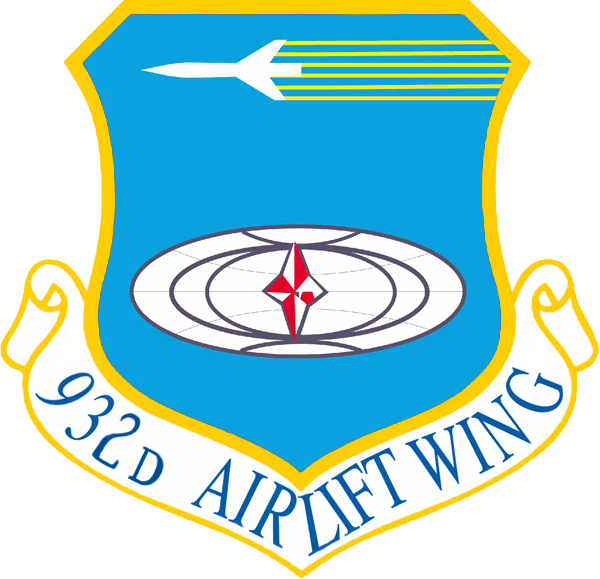
- 932nd Airlift Wing emblem (Note: Approved 5 June 1995.)

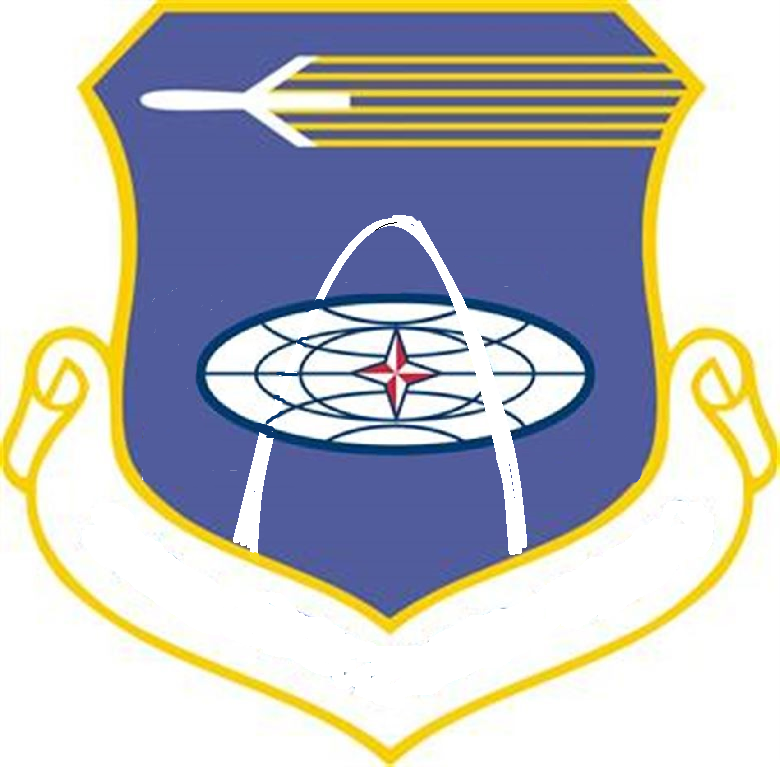
- 932d Aeromedical Airlift Group emblem] (Note: Approved 11 August 1969.)

Aircraft flown
- Transport: C-40 Clipper

The 932nd Airlift Wing is an Air Force Reserve Command flying unit. It is assigned to the Twenty-Second Air Force, Air Force Reserve Command, stationed at Scott Air Force Base, Illinois.

== Mission ==
The unit's C-40C aircraft provide first-class, worldwide, safe, and reliable airlift for distinguished visitors and their staffs. The wing maintains aircraft for special assignment missions. It equips, trains and organizes a ready force of airmen to support and maintain all facets of air base operations involving infrastructure and security. The wing also provides worldwide medical services to warfighters from the front line to the continental United States fixed medical treatment facilities. Airmen of the wing have deployed around the world in many specialties ranging from operations, to security forces, doctors and nurses, aeromedical evacuation, force support, maintenance, and explosive ordnance disposal technicians.

== Components ==
- 932nd Operations Group
  - 73rd Airlift Squadron
  - 54th Airlift Squadron (Active Associate)
  - 932 Aeromedical Evacuation Squadron
  - 932 Operations Support Flight
- 932nd Maintenance Group
  - 932 Aircraft Maintenance Squadron
  - 932 Maintenance Squadron
  - 932 Maintenance Operations Flight
- 932nd Mission Support Group
  - 932 Civil Engineering Squadron
  - 932 Security Forces Squadron
  - 932 Force Support Squadron
  - 932 Logisitics Readiness Flight
- 932nd Medical Group
  - 932 Medical Squadron
  - 932 Aerospace Medical Squadron
  - 932 Aeromedical Staging Squadron

== History ==
=== Need for reserve troop carrier groups ===
After May 1959, the reserve flying force consisted of 45 troop carrier squadrons assigned to 15 troop carrier wings. (Note: There were an additional four rescue squadrons not assigned to the wings. Cantwell, p. 156.) The squadrons were not all located with their parent wings, but were spread over thirty-five Air Force, Navy and civilian airfields under what was called the Detached Squadron Concept. The concept offered several advantages. Communities were more likely to accept the smaller squadrons than the large wings and the location of separate squadrons in smaller population centers would facilitate recruiting and manning. However, under this concept, all support organizations were located with the wing headquarters. Although this was not a problem when the entire wing was called to active service, mobilizing a single flying squadron and elements to support it proved difficult. This weakness was demonstrated in the partial mobilization of reserve units during the Berlin Crisis of 1961. To resolve this, at the start of 1962, Continental Air Command, (ConAC) determined to reorganize its reserve wings by establishing groups with support elements for each of its troop carrier squadrons. This reorganization would facilitate mobilization of elements of wings in various combinations when needed.

=== Activation of the 932nd Troop Carrier Group ===
As a result, the 932nd Troop Carrier Group was activated at Scott Air Force Base, Illinois on 11 February 1963 as the headquarters for the 73rd Troop Carrier Squadron, which had been stationed there since November 1957. Along with group headquarters, a Combat Support Squadron, Materiel Squadron and a Tactical Infirmary were organized to support the 73rd.

If mobilized, the group was gained by Tactical Air Command (TAC), which was also responsible for its training. Its mission was to organize, recruit and train Air Force reservists with Fairchild C-119 Flying Boxcars in the tactical airlift of airborne forces, their equipment and supplies and delivery of these forces and materials by airdrop, landing or cargo extraction systems.

The 932nd performed routine tactical reserve airlift operations until 1 April 1967 when it was upgraded to the long-range Douglas C-124 Globemaster II. It flew overseas missions, particularly to the Far East and Southeast Asia during the Vietnam War. In 1969 it was reassigned to the 514th Military Airlift Wing and re-equipped with the Douglas C-9A Nightingale aeromedical airlifter. It began performing worldwide humanitarian airlift and casualty evacuation from South Vietnam. Today it still provides worldwide medical services to the warfighter from the front line to Continental United States fixed medical treatment facilities.

Upgraded to a wing level in 1994, it equipped with the VC-9 in 2005 and received the Boeing C-40 Clipper in 2007. The unit provides first-class, worldwide, safe, and reliable airlift for distinguished visitors and their staffs. The wing maintains aircraft for special assignment missions. In addition, the 932nd equips, trains and organizes a ready force of citizen airmen to support and maintain all facets of air base operations involving infrastructure and security.

== Lineage ==
- Established as the 932nd Troop Carrier Group, Medium and activated on 15 January 1963 (not organized)

Organized in the reserve on 11 February 1963
Redesignated: 932nd Military Airlift Group on 1 April 1967
Redesignated: 932nd Aeromedical Airlift Group (Associate) on 25 July 1969
Redesignated: 932nd Airlift Wing on 1 October 1994

=== Assignments ===
- Continental Air Command, 15 January 1963 (not organized)
- 434th Troop Carrier Wing, 11 February 1963
- 442nd Military Airlift Wing, 1 October 1966
- 514th Military Airlift Wing, 1 April 1969
- Central Air Force Reserve Region, 1 January 1972
- Fourteenth Air Force, 8 October 1976
- 446th Airlift Wing, 1 August 1992
- Fourth Air Force, 1 October 1994
- Twenty-Second Air Force, 10 December 2015

=== Components ===
- 932nd Operations Group: 1 August 1992 – present
- 73rd Troop Carrier Squadron (later 73rd Military Airlift Squadron, 73rd Aeromedical Airlift Squadron, 73 Airlift Squadron): 11 February 1963 – 1 Aug 1992

=== Stations ===
- Scott Air Force Base, Illinois, 11 February 1963 – present

=== Aircraft ===
- Fairchild C-119 Flying Boxcar (1963–1967)
- Douglas C-124 Globemaster II (1967–1969)
- Douglas C-9A Nightingale (1969–2005)
- McDonnell Douglas VC-9C (2005–2011)
- Boeing C-40C Clipper (2007–present) Four aircraft stationed at Scott Air Force Base.
