= 375th Air Mobility Wing =

Unit of the United States Air Force

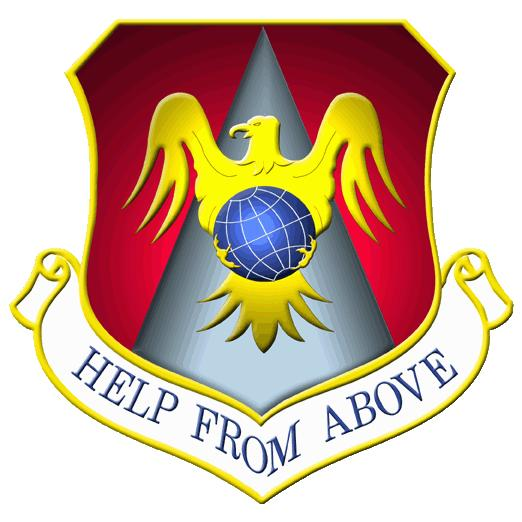
- 375th Air Mobility Wing (Note: Approved 31 January 1966.)
- Active: 1949–1952; 1952–1957; 1966–present
- Country: United States
- Branch: United States Air Force
- Role: Airlift
- Part of: Air Mobility Command
- Garrison/HQ: Scott Air Force Base
- Mottos: Firmamentum et Auxiliam (Latin for 'Support and Help')De Super Adiumentum (Latin for 'Help from Above') (Note: Later, the English form was used as the unit motto.)
- Decorations: Air Force Outstanding Unit Award; Philippine Presidential Unit Citation

Commanders
- Current commander: Colonel John D. Poole
- Vice commander: Colonel Richard K. Kind
- Command Chief: Command Chief Master Sergeant Chief Master Sergeant Shawn A. Andrews

The 375th Air Mobility Wing is a unit of the United States Air Force stationed at Scott Air Force Base, Illinois and assigned to Eighteenth Air Force under Air Mobility Command.

The wing has four primary missions. It supports aeromedical evacuation within the United States. It provides operational support airlift for government officials. It offers direct security for U.S. community and nation. And it provides support for U.S. host units—making possible the command and control of the United States' entire military transportation effort.

== Units ==
375th Operations Group (375 OG)

- 54th Airlift Squadron (54 AS) (Scott Air Force Base, Illinois) C-40
- 458th Airlift Squadron (458 AS) (Scott Air Force Base Illinois) C-21
- 906th Air Refueling Squadron (906 ARS) (Scott Air Force Base, Illinois) KC-135R
- 375th Aeromedical Evacuation Squadron (375 AES) (Scott Air Force Base, Illinois)
- 375th Operations Support Squadron (375 OSS) (Scott Air Force Base, Illinois)
- 375th Operations Group Detachment 1 (375 OG/Det 1) (Will Rogers World Airport, Oklahoma)
- 375th Operations Group Detachment 4 (375 OG/Det 4) (Wright-Patterson Air Force Base, Ohio)

375th Mission Support Group (375 MSG)

- 375th Civil Engineer Squadron (375 CES)
- 375th Contracting Squadron (375 CONS)
- 375th Force Support Squadron (375 FSS)
- 375th Logistics Readiness Squadron (375 LRS)
- 375th Security Forces Squadron (375 SFS)
- 375th Communications Squadron (375 CS)

375th Medical Group (375 MDG)

- 375th Aerospace Medicine Squadron (375 AMDS)
- 375th Dental Squadron (375 DS)
- 375th Medical Operations Squadron (375 MDOS)
- 375th Medical Support Squadron (375 MDSS)

== History ==
The 375th Troop Carrier Wing, Medium was activated at Greater Pittsburgh Airport, Pennsylvania and trained in the Reserve from May 1949 until it was called to active duty in October 1950. After a period of intensive training, now as a wing, it participated in troop carrier and airlift operations, paratroop drops, and other exercises, October 1950 – July 1952.

The wing was again allotted to the Reserve for training from July 1952 – November 1957. It conducted domestic aeromedical airlift and evacuation operations in the continental United States, Alaska, and off-shore areas of the North Atlantic and the Caribbean from January 1966 for the Air Force, other Department of Defense agencies, the U.S. Public Health Service, and the Veterans Administration (VA), augmented by aircraft of the Air National Guard and other Military Airlift Command units.

Between January 1966 and April 1975 the wing maintained and scheduled support aircraft at Scott Air Force Base, Illinois, generally using aircrews provided by other Scott-based units to provide scheduled air shuttle and courier service to the east and west coasts. From January 1966 to September 1968 and since June 1973, the wing operated and maintained Scott.

It airlifted more than 700 VA hospital patients from Biloxi and Gulfport, Mississippi, to safety during Hurricane Camille in August 1969; during Project Homecoming in early 1973 the wing flew 119 sorties to airlift some 350 U.S. prisoners of war to 26 hospitals in the United States. In October 1973, it served as an aeromedical evacuation center established under wing control at Scott Air Force Base, Illinois, assumed the functions previously handled by smaller centers at Scott, McGuire Air Force Base, New Jersey, and Travis Air Force Base, California. In April 1975, when the aeromedical evacuation support units in Germany and the Far East came under the wing's control, it became the single-point manager for worldwide DoD aeromedical evacuation services. It evacuated wounded during the invasion of Grenada, 24 October – 9 November 1983. It transported 350 wounded Afghan citizens to hospitals in the United States, May–December 1987. It controlled the 1467th Facility Checking Squadron from October 1987 – September 1991, which inspected DoD navigation aids and radar facilities worldwide. The wing operated and maintained an aeromedical evacuation system on a rotational basis in Southwest Asia, September 1990 – April 1991. It deployed an aeromedical evacuation element to support Operation Allied Force in 1999.

== Lineage ==
- Established as the 375 Troop Carrier Wing, Medium, on 10 May 1949

Activated in the Reserve on 27 June 1949
Ordered to active service on 15 October 1950
Inactivated on 14 July 1952
Activated in the Reserve on 14 July 1952
Inactivated on 16 November 1957
Redesignated 375 Aeromedical Airlift Wing, and activated, on 27 December 1965 (not organized)
Organized on 12 January 1966
Redesignated 375 Military Airlift Wing on 30 March 1990
Redesignated 375 Airlift Wing on 1 December 1991
Redesignated 375 Air Mobility Wing on 1 October 2009

=== Assignments ===
- Ninth Air Force, 23 February 1949
- First Air Force, 1 August 1950
- Tactical Air Command, 16 October 1950
- Eighteenth Air Force, 1 June 1951
- 1st Air Reserve District, 14 July 1952
- First Air Force, 14 January 1954 – 16 November 1957
- Military Air Transport Service (later Military Airlift Command), 27 December 1965 (not organized until 8 January 1966)
- Twenty-Third Air Force, 1 January 1984
- Twenty-Second Air Force, 1 February 1990
- Fifteenth Air Force, 1 July 1993
- Eighteenth Air Force, 1 October 2003 – present

=== Components ===
- 171 Aeromedical Airlift Group: 13 May – 12 December 1968
- 375 Troop Carrier (later, 375 Operations) Group: 27 June 1949 – 14 July 1952; 14 July 1952 – 16 November 1957; 1 December 1991–present
- 10th Aeromedical Airlift Squadron: 12 January 1966 – 8 March 1969.
- 11th Aeromedical Airlift Squadron (later 11th Airlift Squadron): 1 December 1991 – 30 September 2003
- 12th Aeromedical Airlift Squadron: 12 January 1966 – 8 June 1969
- 13th Aeromedical Airlift Squadron: 12 January 1966 – 8 December 1968.
- 54th Airlift Squadron: 30 September 2004–present
- 55th Troop Carrier Squadron: 18 November 1942 – 25 March 1946; 9 August 1947 – 16 November 1957
- 56th Troop Carrier Squadron: 18 November 1942 – 25 March 1946; 3 August 1947 – 16 November 1957
- 57th Troop Carrier Squadron: 18 November 1942 – 25 March 1946; 3 August 1947 – 1 April 1954
- 58th Troop Carrier Squadron: 18 November 1942 – 25 March 1946; 30 September 1947 – 3 October 1950
- 311th Airlift Squadron: 15 June 2005 – present
- 375th Flying Training Squadron: 1 December 1991 – 1 July 1994
- 457th Airlift Squadron: 1 December 1991 – 1 April 1993; 1 April 1997–present
- 458th Airlift Squadron: 1 December 1991–present
- 459th Airlift Squadron: 1 December 1991 – 1 April 1993
- 906th Air Refueling Squadron: 2 October 2009 – present
- 1375th Flying Training Squadron: 1 May 1984 – 1 December 1991
- 1400th Military Airlift Squadron: 15 March 1978 – 1 December 1991
- 1401st Military Airlift Squadron: 15 March 1978 – 1 December 1991
- 1402nd Military Airlift Squadron: 15 March 1978 – 1 December 1991
- 1467th Facility Checking Squadron: 1 October 1987 – 1 October 1991

=== Stations ===
- Greater Pittsburgh Airport, Pennsylvania (1949–1950)
- Donaldson Air Force Base, South Carolina (1950–1952)
- Greater Pittsburgh Airport, Pennsylvania (1952–1957)
- Scott Air Force Base, Illinois (1966 – present)

=== Aircraft ===
- C-47 Skytrain (1942–1946)
- B-17 Flying Fortress (1944)
- C-46 Commando (1944–1946, 1948–1950, 1952–1955)
- T-6 Texan (1947–1950)
- T-11 (1948–1951)
- T-7 (1949–1951)
- C-82 Packet (1950–1952)
- C-45 Expeditor (1951)
- C-119 Flying Boxcar (1954–1957)
- C-118 Liftmaster (1966–1969)
- C-131 Samaritan (1966–1969)
- C-121 Constellation (1968)
- C-9 Nightingale (1968–2003)
- CT-39 Sabreliner (1978–1985)
- C-12 Huron (1984–1994)
- C-21 (1984 – present)
- C-140 (1976–1990)
- C-29 (1990–1991)

- C-40 Clipper (2005–present)
- KC-135 Stratotanker (2009–present)
