= 433rd Operations Group =

433rd Operations Group

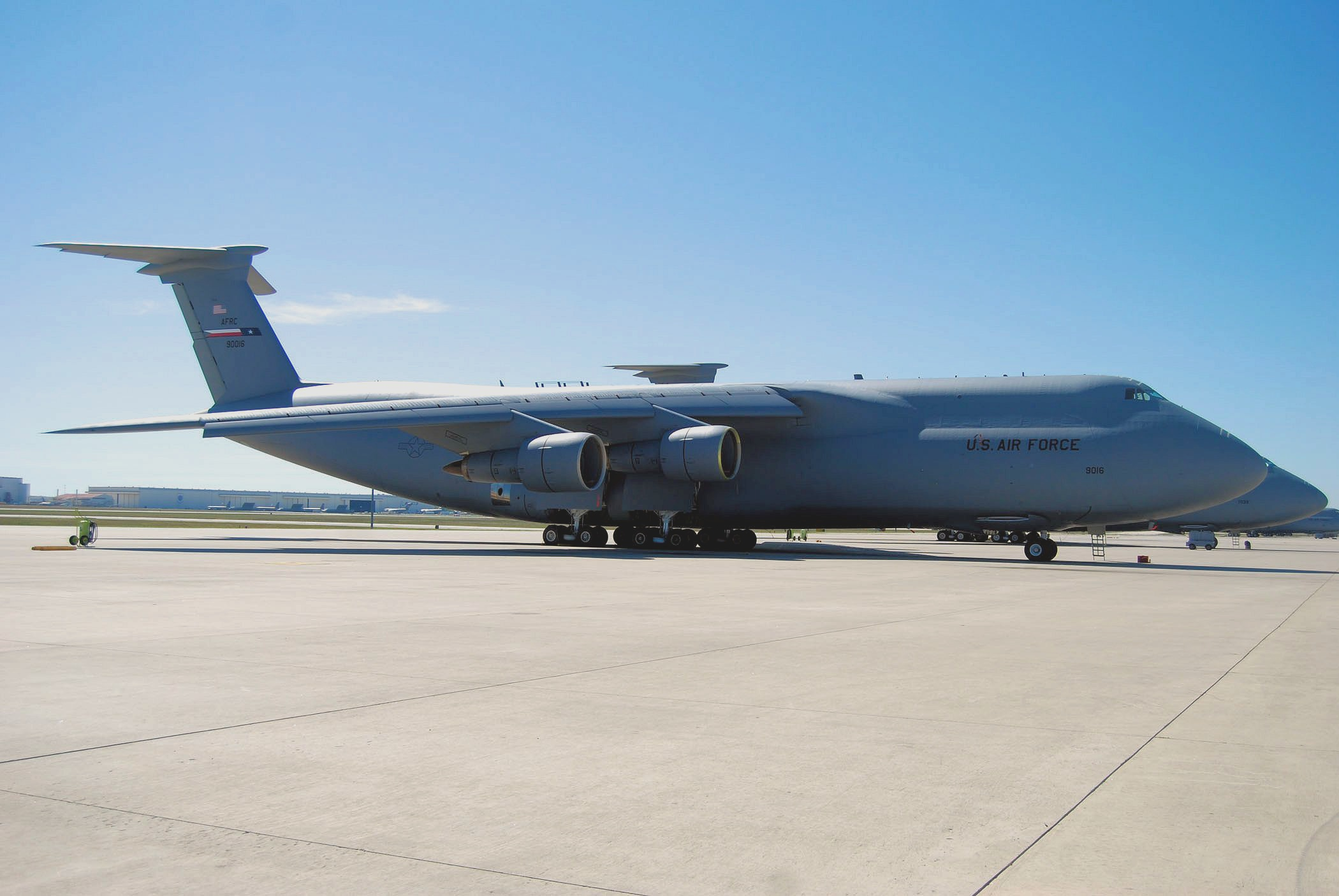
- 433rd Airlift Wing C-5A Galaxy (Note: Aircraft is Lockheed C-5A Galaxy serial 69-16.)
- Active: 1943-1946; 1947-1952; 1955-1959; 1992--present
- Country: United States
- Branch: United States Air Force
- Role: Airlift
- Engagements: Southwest Pacific Theater
- Decorations: Philippine Presidential Unit Citation

Insignia
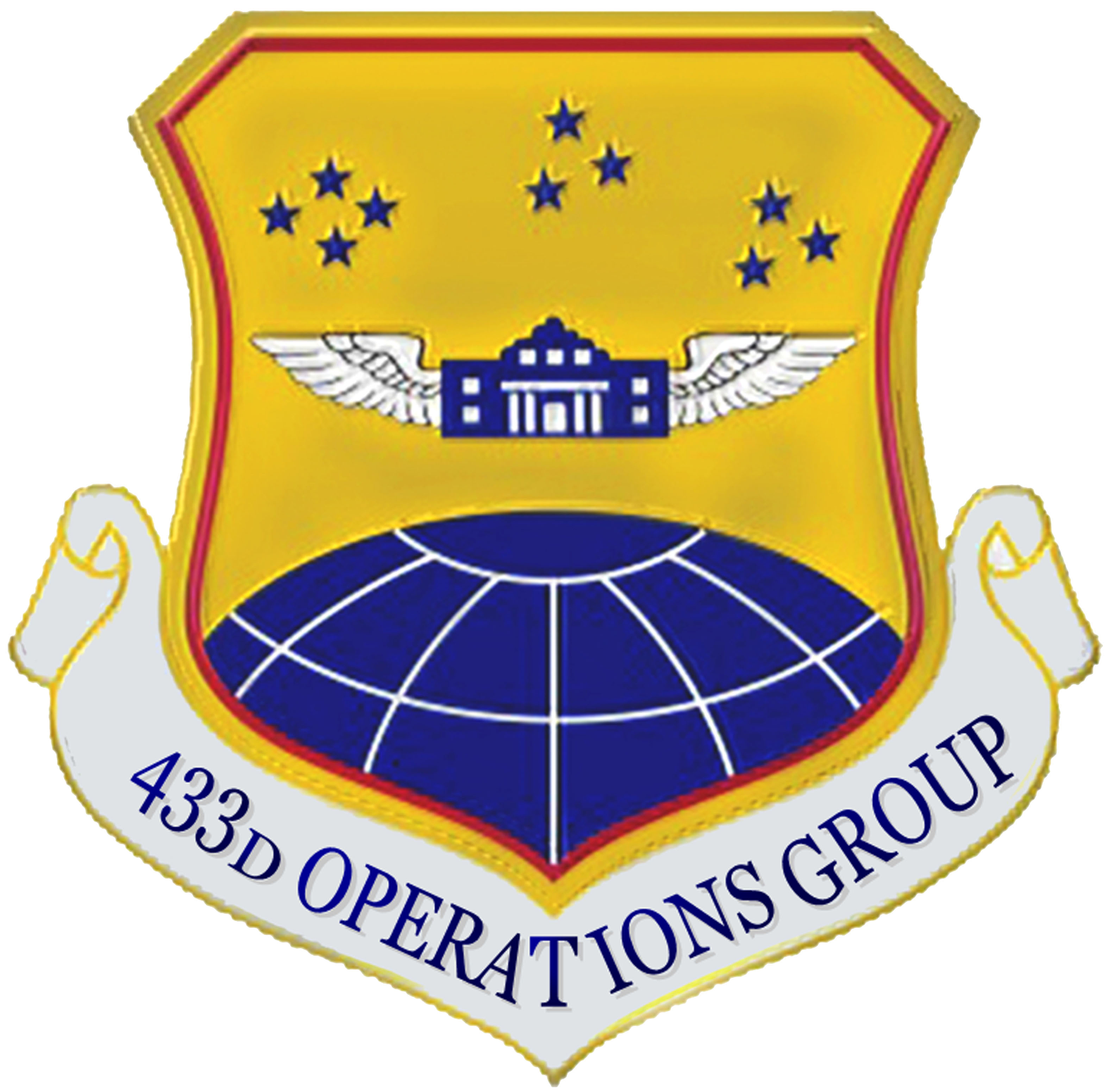
- 433rd Operations Gp emblem (Note: The group uses the 433rd Wing emblem with the group designation on the scroll. Haulman, 433rd Operations Group Factsheet.)

The 433rd Operations Group is the operational flying component of the United States Air Force Reserve 433rd Airlift Wing. It is stationed at Lackland Air Force Base, Texas.

During World War II, as the 433rd Troop Carrier Group, the group operated primarily in the Southwest Pacific Theater transporting such things as gasoline, ammunition, medicine, rations, communications equipment, construction materials and evacuating wounded personnel during numerous campaigns. It was awarded the Philippine Presidential Unit Citation for its role in the liberation of the Philippines during 1944-1945. After the war, the unit served in the reserves and was called to active service during the Korean War. It returned to reserve duty until its inactivation in 1959. It was reactivated in 1992 when the reserves implemented the Objective Wing organization.

== Overview ==
The 433 OG operates two flying squadrons with a total of 8 Lockheed C-5M Galaxy strategic airlift aircraft, transporting personnel and cargo on a worldwide basis. Component squadrons are:

- 68th Airlift Squadron
- 356th Airlift Squadron
- 733rd Training Squadron
- 433rd Aeromedical Evacuation Squadron
- 433rd Airlift Control Flight
- 433rd Operations Support Squadron

== History ==
=== World War II ===
Trained to tow gliders and to transport and drop supplies and paratroops, February–July 1943. Air echelon flew Group's Douglas C-47 Skytrains to New Guinea, via Hawaii, the Fiji Islands, and Australia, August–September 1943, and began operations with Fifth Air Force. Ground echelon sailed from the West Coast on 25 September 1943, arriving in Australia on 10 October 1943. By early November 1943, the two echelons had rejoined at Nadzab Airfield Complex, New Guinea.

Transported troops and carried cargo, such as gasoline, ammunition, medicine, food, equipment, and construction materials; and evacuated wounded personnel. From November 1943 to February 1945, the group was assigned six troop carrier squadrons, rather than the more normal four. Lost operational control of two squadrons, July–November 1944. Squadrons moved, October 1944-January 1945, to Biak Island, and January–February 1945 to the Philippines.

Operations in the Philippines included delivering ammunition, food, and other items to Filipino guerrilla forces; evacuating former allied prisoners of war and civilian internees; transporting combat units from New Guinea, the Netherlands East Indie], and the Solomon Islands. Group flew its one combat glider tow mission on 23 June 1945 to Aparri, Luzon. Transported troops to Okinawa, June–August 1945 and occupation forces to Japan after V-J Day.

=== Air Force reserve ===
Activated as a reserve organization in Ohio on 6 July 1947. Ordered to active service and moved to North Carolina in October 1950; received Fairchild C-119 Flying Boxcar aircraft the following month. Tactical training began in March 1951. Transported personnel and supplies to Army units in the field. Airdropped personnel and equipment during army exercises. Moved to Germany and participated with US, British, and French units in field training until inactivated. By 1958, flew airlift missions and participated in tactical exercises.

Beginning August 1992, the group participated in airlift missions worldwide, including numerous humanitarian missions. The final C-5A Galaxy aircraft (tail number 70-0448) departed Kelly Field on September 28, 2016. The first of the eight Lockheed Martin C-5M Super Galaxy aircraft, arrived June 2016.

== Lineage ==
- Established as the 433rd Troop Carrier Group on 22 January 1943

Activated on 9 February 1943
Inactivated on 15 January 1946

- Activated in the reserve on 6 July 1947

Redesignated 433rd Troop Carrier Group, Medium on 27 June 1949
Ordered to active service on 15 October 1950
Inactivated on 14 July 1952

- Activated in the reserve on 18 May 1955

Inactivated on 14 April 1959
Redesignated: 433rd Tactical Airlift Group on 31 July 1985 (remained inactive)

- Redesignated: 433rd Operations Group on 1 August 1992

Activated in the reserve on 1 August 1992

=== Assignments ===
- I Troop Carrier Command, 9 February 1943
- 52nd Troop Carrier Wing, February 1943
- 50th Troop Carrier Wing, c. 19 March 1943
- 53rd Troop Carrier Wing, 15 April 1943
- 50th Troop Carrier Wing, 2 June 1943
- Fifth Air Force, c. September 1943
- 54th Troop Carrier Wing, 4 October 1943 – 15 January 1946
- Eleventh Air Force, 6 July 1947
- 69th Troop Carrier Wing (later 69th Air Division), 17 October 1947
- 433rd Troop Carrier Wing, 27 June 1949 – 14 July 1952
- 433rd Troop Carrier Wing, 18 May 1955 – 14 April 1959
- 433rd Airlift Wing, 1 August 1992 – present

=== Components ===
- 5th Troop Carrier Squadron: 28 October 1948 – 28 March 1949
- 65th Troop Carrier Squadron: 9 November 1943 – 20 February 1945
- 66th Troop Carrier Squadron: 9 November 1943 – 20 February 1945
- 67th Troop Carrier Squadron: 9 February 1943 – 15 January 1946 (detached July–November 1944); 6 July 1947 – 14 July 1952; 18 May 1955 – 14 April 1959
- 68th Troop Carrier Squadron (later 68th Airlift Squadron): 9 February 1943 – 15 January 1946; 3 August 1947 – 14 July 1952; 18 May 1955 – 14 April 1959; 1 August 1992–present.
- 69th Troop Carrier Squadron: 9 February 1943 – 15 January 1946; 3 August 1947 – 14 July 1952; 25 March 1956 – 14 April 1959
- 70th Troop Carrier Squadron: 9 February 1943 – 15 January 1946 (detached July–November 1944); 3 August 1947 – 3 October 1950
- 315th Troop Carrier Squadron: 28 October 1948 – 28 March 1949
- 356th Airlift Squadron, 9 Jan 2007 – present

=== Stations ===
- Florence Army Air Field, South Carolina, 9 February 1943
- Sedalia Army Air Field, Missouri, 19 March 1943
- Laurinburg-Maxton Army Air Base, North Carolina, 1 June 1943
- Baer Field, Indiana, 1 August-7 September 1943
- Port Moresby Airfield Complex, New Guinea, late August 1943 (air echelon)
- Nadzab Airfield Complex, New Guinea, November 1943
- Mokmer Airfield, Biak, Netherlands East Indies, 7 November 1944
- Tanauan Airfield, Leyte, Philippines, 11 February 1945
- Clark Field, Luzon, Philippines, June 1945
- Tachikawa Air Base, Japan, 30 September 1945 – 15 January 1946
- Akron Airport, Ohio, 6 July 1947
- Cleveland Municipal Airport, Ohio, 27 June 1949
- Greenville Air Force Base (later Donaldson Air Force Base, South Carolina, 16 October 1950 – 20 July 1951
- Rhein-Main Air Base, Germany, 5 August 1951 – 14 July 1952
- Brooks Air Force Base, Texas, 18 May 1955 – 14 April 1959
- Kelly Air Force Base (later Kelly Annex, Lackland Air Force Base, Texas, 1 August 1992 – present

=== Aircraft ===
- C-53 Skytrooper, 1943
- C-47 Skytrain, 1943–1945
- B-17 Flying Fortress, 1944
- C-46 Commando, 1944–1945; 1949–1950; 955-1958
- C-119 Flying Boxcar, 1950–1952; 1958–1959
- C-45 Expeditor, 1955-c. 1956
- C-5 Galaxy, 1992–2006
- Lockheed C-5M Super Galaxy (2016 - Present)
