= 70th Troop Carrier Squadron =

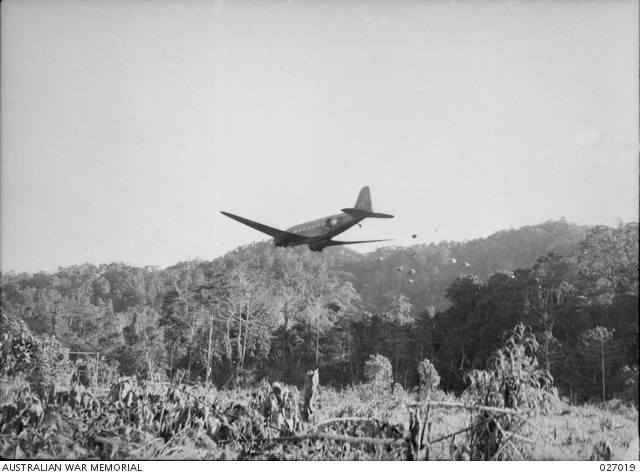
- C-47 Skytrain dropping supplies to ground forces in New Guinea
- Active: 1943–1946; 1947–1950
- Country: United States
- Branch: United States Air Force
- Role: Airlift
- Engagements: Southwest Pacific Theater
- Decorations: Philippine Presidential Unit Citation

Insignia
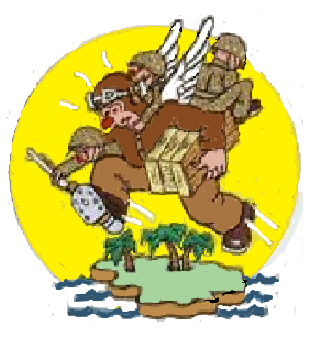
- 70 Troop Carrier Sq emblem (Note: Approved 7 September 1944.)

The 70th Troop Carrier Squadron is an inactive United States Air Force unit. It was last assigned to the 433d Troop Carrier Group, based at Cleveland Municipal Airport, Ohio. It was inactivated on 3 October 1950.

== History ==
=== World War II ===
Aerial transportation during World War II; airborne assault at Aparri, Luzon, 23 June 1945.

== Lineage ==
- Constituted as the 70th Troop Carrier Squadron on 22 January 1943

Activated on 9 February 1943
Inactivated on 15 January 1946

- Activated in the reserve on 3 August 1947

Redesignated 70th Troop Carrier Squadron, Medium on 27 June 1949
Inactivated on 3 October 1950

=== Assignments ===
- 433d Troop Carrier Group, 9 February 1943 – 15 January 1946
- 433d Troop Carrier Group, 3 August 1947 – 3 October 1950

=== Stations ===
- Florence Army Air Field, South Carolina, 9 February 1943
- Sedalia Army Air Field, Missouri, 19 March 1943
- Laurinburg-Maxton Army Air Base, North Carolina, g June 1943
- Baer Field, Indiana, 1–13 August 1943
- RAAF Base Townsville, Australia, 7 September 1943
- Jackson Airfield (7 Mile Drome), Port Moresby, New Guinea, 21 September 1943
- Nadzab Airfield Complex, New Guinea, 10 October 1943
- Hollandia Airfield Complex, Netherlands East Indies, c. 3 July 1944
- Mokmer Airfield, Biak Island, Netherlands East Indies, c. 20 October 1944
- Dulag Airfield, Leyte, Philippines, 28 February 1945
- Tanauan Airfield, Leyte, Philippines, 12 April 1945
- Clark Field, Luzon, Philippines, c. 29 June 1945
- North Field (Iwo Jima), Iwo Jima, 26 August 1945
- Ie Shima Airfield, Okinawa, Ryuku Islands, 15 September 1945
- Tachikawa Airfield, Japan, 30 September 1945 – 15 January 1946
- Cleveland Municipal Airport, Ohio, 27 June 1949 – 3 October 1950

=== Aircraft ===
- Douglas C-47 Skytrain, 1943–1944
- Curtiss C-46 Commando, 1944–1945
