= 67th Tactical Airlift Squadron =

67th Tactical Airlift Squadron

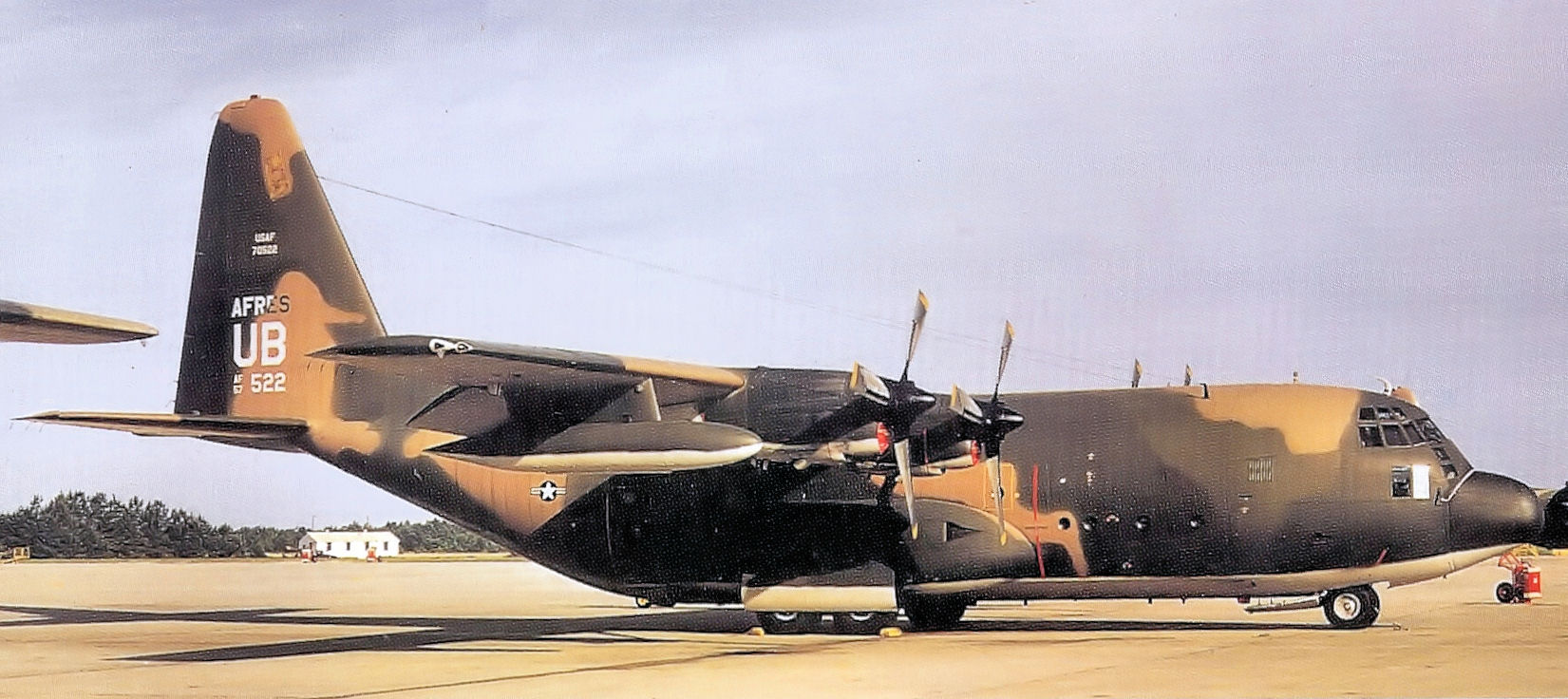
- C-130 Hercules of the Air Force Reserves (Note: Aircraft is Lockheed C-130A-55-LM Hercules serial 57-522, taken at Richards-Gebaur AFB about 1974.)
- Active: 1943–1946; 1947–1952; 1955–1974
- Country: United States
- Branch: United States Air Force
- Role: Airlift
- Part of: Air Force Reserve Command
- Engagements: Southwest Pacific Theater
- Decorations: Philippine Presidential Unit Citation

Insignia
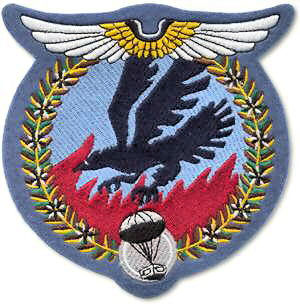
- Patch with 67th Tactical Airlift Squadron emblem (approved 19 February 1945

The 67th Troop Carrier Squadron is an inactive United States Air Force unit. It was last assigned to the 433d Troop Carrier Group, based at Rhein-Main Air Base, West Germany. It was inactivated on July 14, 1952.

== History ==
=== World War II ===
Established under I Troop Carrier Command, January 1943. after training deployed to Fifth Air Force in the Southwest Pacific Theater, August 1943 during the New Guinea Campaign. Engaged in combat operations, flying combat cargo resupply missions, troop carrier missions, parachute drops and other missions as necessary in New Guinea, Dutch East Indies; Philippine Campaign and the Battle of Okinawa. Participated in the Occupation of Japan, 1945–1946.

=== Reserve duty and Korean War mobilization ===
The squadron was again activated in the reserve in April 1947. In July it again became part of the 433d Troop Carrier Group. It is not clear to what extent the unit was equipped and manned before 27 June 1949, when Continental Air Command (ConAC) reorganized its reserve units under the wing base organization system and the 433d Troop Carrier Wing replaced the 12th Air Division as the headquarters organization for reserve flying units at Cleveland. After this date the squadron was manned at 25% of normal strength. The wing flew various trainer aircraft and Curtiss C-46 Commandos.

The squadron, along with all reserve combat and corollary units, was mobilized for the Korean war. It was part of the first wave to be mobilized (Note: The 452d Bombardment Wing and 437th Troop Carrier Wing were the only reserve units mobilized for the Korean War before the 433d Wing and its components. Cantwell, p. 87.) Upon activation in October 1950, the squadron moved to Greenville Air Force Base (later Donaldson Air Force Base), South Carolina; receiving Fairchild C-119 Flying Boxcar aircraft the following month. The unit began tactical training in March 1951. It airlifted personnel and supplies to United States Army units in the field. It also airdropped personnel and equipment during army exercises.

The 67th left Donaldson in July 1952 and arrived at Rhein-Main Air Base, Germany in early August. In Europe, it participated with U.S., British, and French units in field training. In July 1952, the squadron was inactivated and its mission, personnel and equipment were assumed by the 39th Troop Carrier Squadron, which was simultaneously activated at Rhein-Main.

=== Reactivation in the reserve ===
The Air Force desired that all reserve units be designed to augment the regular forces in the event of a national emergency. In the early 1950s, there were six reserve pilot training wings that had no mobilization mission. These included the 8707th Pilot Training Wing at Brooks Air Force Base, Texas. On 18 May 1955, the 8707th and its components were discontinued and replaced by the reactivated 433d Troop Carrier Wing (including the 67th Troop Carrier Squadron), again flying Curtiss Commandos.

In the summer of 1956, the squadron participated in Operation Sixteen Ton during its two weeks of active duty training. Sixteen Ton was performed entirely by reserve troop carrier units and moved United States Coast Guard equipment From Floyd Bennett Naval Air Station to Isla Grande Airport in Puerto Rico and San Salvador in the Bahamas. After the success of this operation, the wing began to use inactive duty training periods for Operation Swift Lift, transporting high priority cargo for the air force and Operation Ready Swap, transporting aircraft engines, between Air Materiel Command's depots. In 1960, the wing and squadron moved across town to Kelly Air Force Base.

=== Reassignment to troop carrier group ===
After May 1959, the reserve flying force consisted of 45 troop carrier squadrons assigned to 15 troop carrier wings. (Note: There were an additional four rescue squadrons not assigned to the wings. Cantwell, p. 156) The squadrons were not all located with their parent wings, but were spread over thirty-five Air Force, Navy and civilian airfields under what was called the Detached Squadron Concept. The concept offered several advantages. Communities were more likely to accept the smaller squadrons than the large wings and the location of separate squadrons in smaller population centers would facilitate recruiting and manning. However, under this concept, all support organizations were located with the wing headquarters. Although this was not a problem when the entire wing was called to active service, mobilizing a single flying squadron and elements to support it proved difficult. This weakness was demonstrated in the partial mobilization of reserve units during the Berlin Crisis of 1961. To resolve this, at the start of 1962, Continental Air Command, (ConAC) determined to reorganize its reserve wings by establishing groups with support elements for each of its troop carrier squadrons. This reorganization would facilitate mobilization of elements of wings in various combinations when needed.\

As a result, the 921st Troop Carrier Group was established at Kelly Air Force Base, Texas on 17 January 1963 as squadron's headquarters. Along with group headquarters, a Combat Support Squadron, Materiel Squadron and a Tactical Infirmary were organized to support the 67th. If mobilized, the group was gained by Tactical Air Command (TAC), which was also responsible for its training.

In June 1974, the two reserve airlift groups at Kelly were reduced to a single unit. At the end of the month, the 922d Tactical Airlift Group was inactivated and its 68th Tactical Airlift Squadron took over the remaining assets of the 67th as it transferred to the 921st Group.

== Lineage ==
- Constituted as the 67th Troop Carrier Squadron on 22 January 1943
- Activated on 9 February 1943

Inactivated on 15 January 1946

- Activated in the reserve on 13 April 1947

Redesignated 67th Troop Carrier Squadron, Medium on 27 June 1949
Ordered to active service on 15 October 1950
Inactivated on 14 July 1952

- Activated 18 May 1955

Redesignated 67th Military Airlift Squadron on 1 July 1966
Redesignated 67th Tactical Airlift Squadron on 19 June 1971
Inactivated 30 June 1974

=== Assignments ===
- 433d Troop Carrier Group, 9 February 1943 – 15 January 1946
- Eleventh Air Force, 13 April 1947 (Note: This air force is not related to the current Eleventh Air Force, but was responsible for reserve and National Guard aviation units between 1946 and 1948.)
- 433d Troop Carrier Group, 6 July 1947 – 14 July 1952
- 433d Troop Carrier Group, 18 May 1955 – 14 April 1959
- 433d Troop Carrier Wing, 14 April 1959
- 921st Tactical Airlift Group, 17 January 1963 – 30 June 1974

=== Stations ===
- Florence Army Air Field, South Carolina, 9 February 1943
- Sedalia Army Air Field, Missouri, 19 March 1943
- Laurinburg-Maxton Army Air Base, North Carolina, 9 June 1943
- Baer Field, Indiana, 1–12 August 1943
- 7-Mile Drome, Port Moresby, New Guinea, 27 August 1943
- Nadzab Airfield Complex, New Guinea, 5 November 1943
- Hollandia Airfield Complex, Netherlands East Indies, c. 10 July 1944
- Mokmer Airfield, Biak Island, Netherlands East Indies, c. 20 October 1944
- Tanauan Airfield, Leyte, Philippines, 18 January 1945
- Clark Field, Luzon, Philippines, c. 1 June 1945
- North Field (Iwo Jima), Ryuku Islands, c. 27 August 1945
- Ie Shima Airfield, Ryuku Islands, 9 September 1945
- Tachikawa Airfield, Japan, c. 25 September 1945 – 15 January 1946
- Cleveland Municipal Airport, Ohio, 13 April 1947
- Greenville Air Force Base (later Donaldson Air Force Base), South Carolina, 18 October 1950 – 20 July 1951
- Rhein-Main Air Base, Germany, 6 August 1951 – 14 July 1952
- Brooks Air Force Base, Texas, 18 May 1955
- Kelly Air Force Base, Texas 1 November 1960 – 30 June 1974

=== Aircraft ===
- Douglas C-47 Skytrain, 1943–1944
- Curtiss C-46 Commando, 1944–1945, 1949–1950
- Fairchild C-119 Flying Boxcar, 1950–1952; 1955-1966
- Douglas C-124 Globemaster II, 1966–1971
- Lockheed C-130 Hercules, 1971–1974
