= 69th Troop Carrier Squadron =

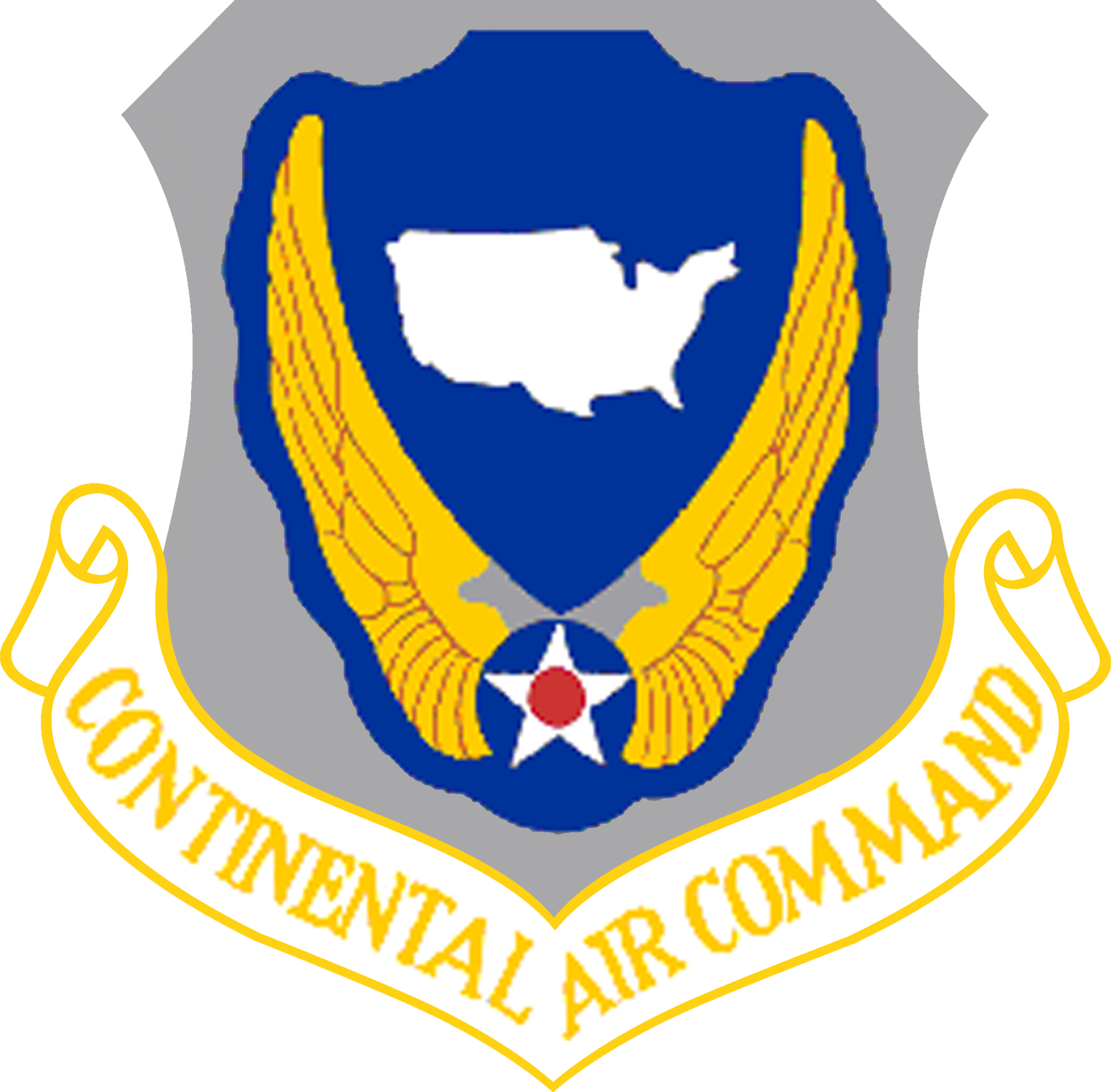
69th Troop Carrier Squadron

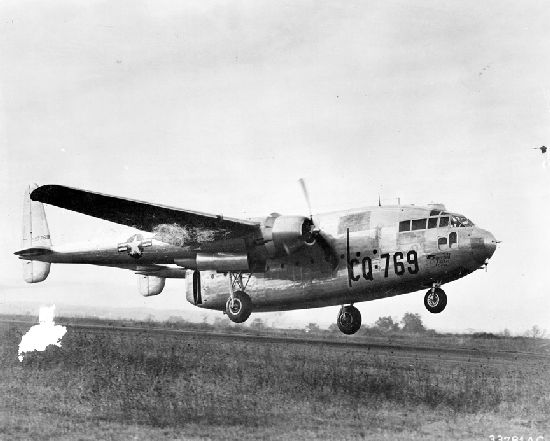
- C-119 Flying Boxcar as flown by the squadron
- Active: 1943-1946; 1947–1952; 1956–1965
- Country: United States
- Branch: United States Air Force
- Role: Tactical Airlift
- Part of: Continental Air Command
- Engagements: Southwest Pacific Theater
- Decorations: Philippine Presidential Unit Citation

Insignia
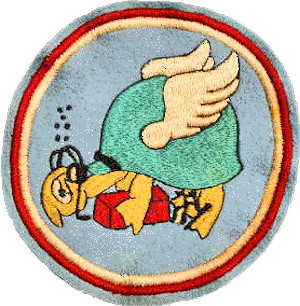
- Patch with 69th Troop Carrier Squadron emblem (approved 20 September 1944)

The 69th Troop Carrier Squadron is an inactive United States Air Force unit. It was last active with the 916th Troop Carrier Group, based at Carswell Air Force Base, Texas. It was inactivated on 25 November 1965.

== History ==
=== World War II ===
Established under I Troop Carrier Command, January 1943. After training deployed to Fifth Air Force in the Southwest Pacific Theater, August 1943 during the New Guinea Campaign. Engaged in combat operations, flying combat cargo resupply missions, troop carrier missions, parachute drops and other missions as necessary in New Guinea, Dutch East Indies; Philippine Campaign and the Battle of Okinawa. Participated in the Occupation of Japan, 1945–1946.

=== Air Force Reserve ===
Reactivated in the Air Force Reserve 1947, activated at Cleveland Airport, Ohio. Not equipped or manned until 1950 when moved to Greenville AFB, South Carolina when equipped with C-119 Flying Boxcars. Activated during Korean War.

Reactivated in the reserves, 1956, equipped with C-119s. Inactivated 1965

== Lineage ==
- Constituted as the 69th Troop Carrier Squadron on 22 January 1943

Activated on 9 February 1943
Inactivated on 15 January 1946

- Activated in the reserve on 3 August 1947

Redesignated 69th Troop Carrier Squadron, Medium on 27 June 1949
Ordered to active service on 15 October 1950
Inactivated on 14 July 1952

- Activated in the reserve on 25 March 1956

Inactivated on 25 November 1965

=== Assignments ===
- 433d Troop Carrier Group, 9 February 1943 – 15 January 1946
- 433d Troop Carrier Group, 3 August 1947 – 14 July 1952
- 433d Troop Carrier Group, 25 March 1956
- 433d Troop Carrier Wing, 14 April 1959
- 923d Troop Carrier Group, 17 January 1963 - 25 November 1965

=== Stations ===
- Florence Army Air Field, South Carolina, 9 February 1943
- Sedalia Army Air Field, Missouri, 19 March 1943
- Laurinburg-Maxton Army Air Base, North Carolina, 6 June 1943
- Baer Field, Indiana, 1 – 12 August 1943
- Jackson Airfield (7 Mile Drome), Port Moresby, New Guinea, 27 August 1943
- Nadzab Airfield Complex, New Guinea, 5 November 1943
- Hollandia Airfield Complex, Netherlands East Indies, c. 10 July 1944
- Mokmer Airfield, Biak Island, Netherlands East Indies, c. 20 October 1944
- Tanauan Airfield, Leyte, Philippines, 18 January 1945
- Clark Field, Luzon, Philippines, c. 1 June 1945
- North Field (Iwo Jima), C. 27 August 1945
- Ie Shima Airfield, Okinawa, 9 September 1945
- Tachikawa Airfield, Japan, c. 25 September 1945 – 15 January 1946
- Cleveland Municipal Airport, Ohio, 13 April 1947
- Greenville Air Force Base, South Carolina, 18 October 1950 – 20 July 1951
- Rhein-Main Air Base, West Germany, 6 Aug 1951–14 Jul 1952
- Tinker Air Force Base, Oklahoma, 25 March 1956
- Hensley Field, Texas, 16 November 1957
- Carswell Air Force Base, Texas, 3 March 1963 - 25 November 1965

=== Aircraft ===
- Douglas C-47 Skytrain, 1943–1945
- Boeing B-17 Flying Fortress, 1944 (used as transport)
- Curtiss C-46 Commando, 1944
- Fairchild C-119 Flying Boxcar, 1950–1952; 1956-1965
