= 69 Squadron =

69 Squadron may refer to:

- No. 3 Squadron RAAF, an Australian unit which was designated No. 69 Squadron of the Royal Flying Corps during a part of World War I
- No. 69 (Reserve) Squadron RAAF, a reserve Australian unit formed as part of No. 4 Service Flying Training School RAAF during World War II
- 69 Squadron (Israel)
- No. 69 Squadron RAF, United Kingdom
- 69th Aero Squadron, Air Service, United States Army
- 69th Bomb Squadron, United States Air Force
- 69th Fighter Squadron, United States Air Force
- 69th Troop Carrier Squadron, United States Air Force
- VP-69, United States Navy
