= 921st Tactical Airlift Group =

921st Tactical Airlift Group

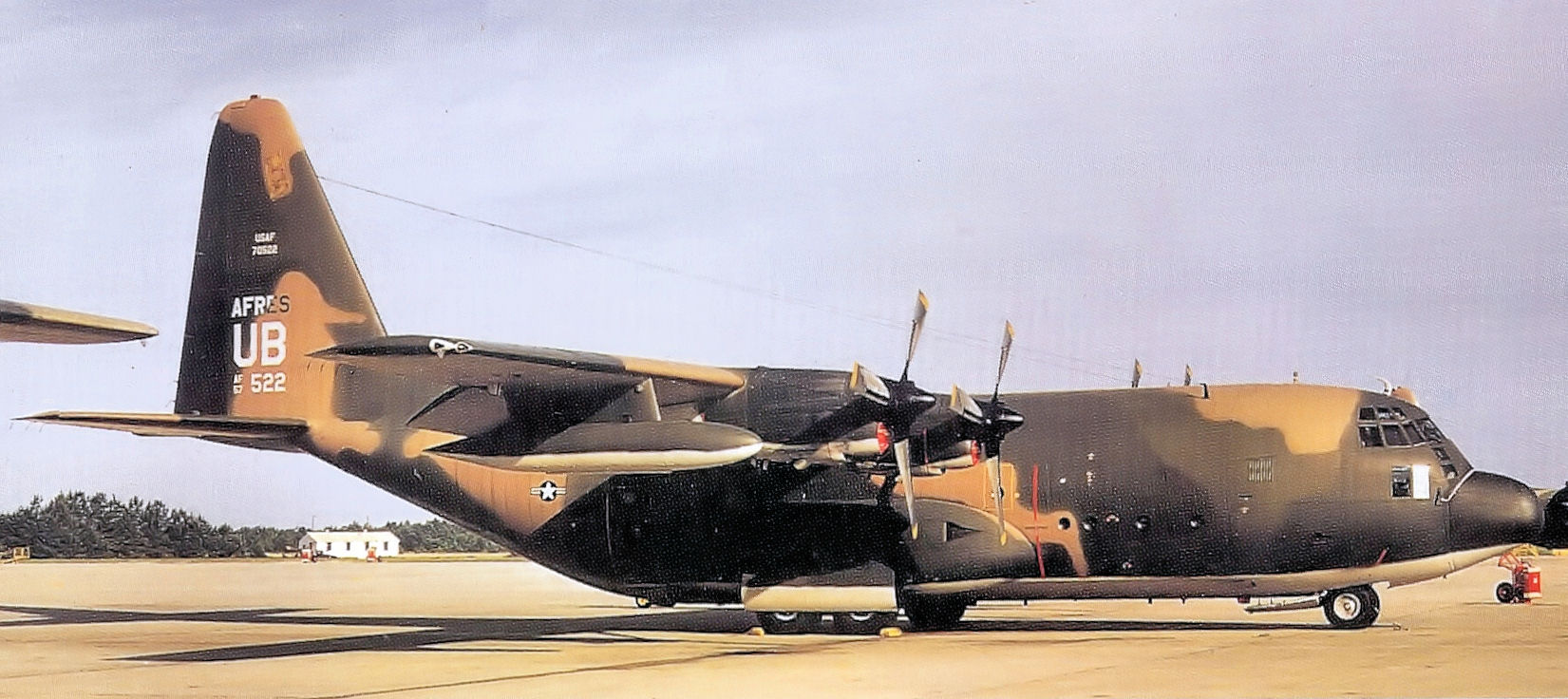
- C-130 Hercules of the Air Force Reserves (Note: Aircraft is Lockheed C-130A-55-LM Hercules serial 57-522, taken at Richards-Gebaur AFB about 1974.)
- Active: 1963–1974
- Country: United States
- Branch: United States Air Force
- Role: Airlift
- Part of: Air Force Reserve

The 921st Tactical Airlift Group is an inactive United States Air Force Reserve unit. It was last active with the 433d Tactical Airlift Wing, based at Kelly Air Force Base, Texas. It was inactivated on 1 November 1994.

== History ==
=== Need for reserve troop carrier groups ===
After May 1959, the reserve flying force consisted of 45 troop carrier squadrons assigned to 15 troop carrier wings. (Note: There were an additional four rescue squadrons not assigned to the wings. Cantwell, p. 156) The squadrons were not all located with their parent wings, but were spread over thirty-five Air Force, Navy and civilian airfields under what was called the Detached Squadron Concept. The concept offered several advantages. Communities were more likely to accept the smaller squadrons than the large wings and the location of separate squadrons in smaller population centers would facilitate recruiting and manning. However, under this concept, all support organizations were located with the wing headquarters. Although this was not a problem when the entire wing was called to active service, mobilizing a single flying squadron and elements to support it proved difficult. This weakness was demonstrated in the partial mobilization of reserve units during the Berlin Crisis of 1961. To resolve this, at the start of 1962, Continental Air Command, (ConAC) determined to reorganize its reserve wings by establishing groups with support elements for each of its troop carrier squadrons. This reorganization would facilitate mobilization of elements of wings in various combinations when needed.

=== Activation of the 921st Troop Carrier Group ===
As a result, the 921st Troop Carrier Group was established at Kelly Air Force Base, Texas on 17 January 1963 as the headquarters for the 67th Troop Carrier Squadron, which had been stationed there since May 1960. Along with group headquarters, a Combat Support Squadron, Materiel Squadron and a Tactical Infirmary were organized to support the 67th.

If mobilized, the group was gained by Tactical Air Command (TAC), which was also responsible for its training. Its mission was to organize, recruit and train Air Force reservists in the tactical airlift of airborne forces, their equipment and supplies and delivery of these forces and materials by airdrop, landing or cargo extraction systems.

The group was one of three groups assigned to the 433d Troop Carrier Wing in 1963, the others being the 922d Troop Carrier Group, also at Kelly and the 923d Troop Carrier Group at Carswell Air Force Base, Texas.

Ordered to active duty during the Pueblo Crisis in January 1968, the unit was assigned to the 349th Military Airlift Wing at Travis Air Force Base, California, although the group's headquarters remained at Kelly. The group flew missions to numerous places including England, South Vietnam, South Korea, Thailand, Japan, as well as numerous bases in the United States. In November 1968, the reservists were informed that their active duty service would be reduced from 24 months to 18 months, the unit was returned to reserve service on 1 June 1969.

In 1971, the group's aged Douglas C-124 Globemaster IIs were retired, and replaced by more modern Lockheed C-130A Hercules transports. It participated in conducting the USAF's C-130A model Hercules pilot, navigator, flight engineer and loadmaster school. It also trained for tactical airlift missions, participating in joint training exercises. It provided airlift of Department of Defense personnel, supplies, and equipment worldwide. Inactivated in November 1974, with personnel and aircraft being assigned directly to the 433d Wing.

== Lineage ==
- Established as the 921st Troop Carrier Group, Medium and activated on 28 December 1962 (not organized)

Organized in the Reserve on 17 January 1963
Redesignated 921st Military Airlift Group on 1 July 1966
Ordered to active service on 26 January 1968
Relieved from active duty on 1 June 1969
Redesignated 921st Tactical Airlift Group on 29 July 1971
Inactivated on 1 November 1974

=== Assignments ===
- Continental Air Command, 28 December 1963
- 433d Troop Carrier Wing (later Tactical Airlift Wing), 17 January 1963
- 349th Military Airlift Wing, 26 January 1968
- 433d Tactical Airlift Wing (later 433d Military Airlift Wing, 433d Tactical Airlift Wing), 2 June 1969 – 1 November 1974

=== Components ===
- 67th Troop Carrier Squadron (later Military Airlift Squadron, Tactical Airlift Squadron), 17 January 1963 – 30 June 1974
- 68th Tactical Airlift Squadron, 30 June – 1 November 1974

=== Stations ===
- Kelly Air Force Base, Texas, 17 January 1963 – 1 November 1974

=== Aircraft ===
- Douglas C-124 Globemaster II, 1963–1971
- Lockheed C-130 Hercules, 1971–1974
