= 901st Tactical Airlift Group =

901st Tactical Airlift Group

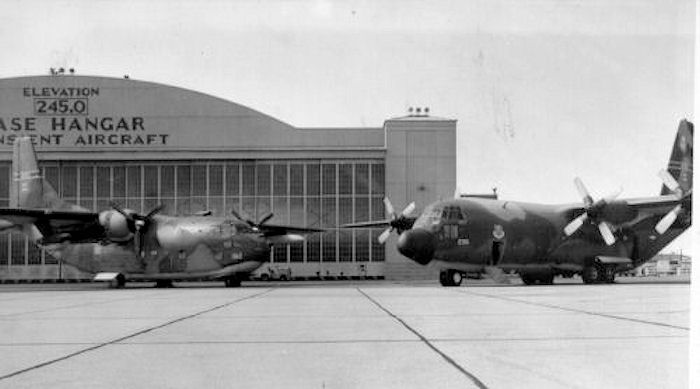
- 901st Group C-123K Provider at Westover AFB with a C-130 Hercules
- Active: 1963–1985
- Country: United States
- Branch: United States Air Force
- Role: Airlift
- Part of: Air Force Reserve

Insignia
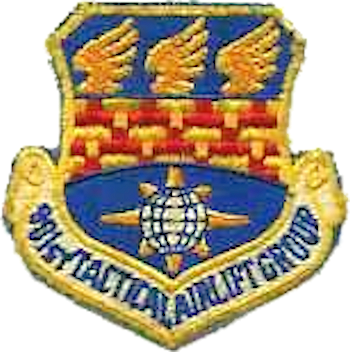
- 901st Tactical Airlift Group emblem

The 901st Tactical Airlift Group is an inactive United States Air Force Reserve unit. It was last active with the 433d Airlift Wing, based at Peterson Air Force Base, Colorado, where it was inactivated on 1 April 1985.

The group was first activated at Hanscom Field in early 1963 as the 901st Troop Carrier Group.

== History ==
=== Need for reserve troop carrier groups ===
After May 1959, the reserve flying force consisted of 45 troop carrier squadrons assigned to 15 troop carrier wings. (Note: There were an additional four rescue squadrons not assigned to the wings. Cantwell, p. 156) The squadrons were not all located with their parent wings, but were spread over thirty-five Air Force, Navy and civilian airfields under what was called the Detached Squadron Concept. The concept offered several advantages. Communities were more likely to accept the smaller squadrons than the large wings and the location of separate squadrons in smaller population centers would facilitate recruiting and manning. However, under this concept, all support organizations were located with the wing headquarters. Although this was not a problem when the entire wing was called to active service, mobilizing a single flying squadron and elements to support it proved difficult. This weakness was demonstrated in the partial mobilization of reserve units during the Berlin Crisis of 1961. To resolve this, at the start of 1962, Continental Air Command, (ConAC) determined to reorganize its reserve wings by establishing groups with support elements for each of its troop carrier squadrons. This reorganization would facilitate mobilization of elements of wings in various combinations when needed.

=== Activation of the 901st Troop Carrier Group ===
However, the 94th Troop Carrier Wing and its squadrons were mobilized for the Cuban Missile Crisis. The wing was released from active duty on 22 November 1962, but the mobilization delayed its reorganization until February 1963. The 901st Troop Carrier Group, flying Fairchild C-119 Flying Boxcars was activated as the command element for the 731st Troop Carrier Squadron at Laurence G. Hanscom Field, Massachusetts, along with support elements for the 731st.

If mobilized, the group was gained by Tactical Air Command (TAC), which was also responsible for its training. Its mission was to organize, recruit and train Air Force reservists in the tactical airlift of airborne forces, their equipment and supplies and delivery of these forces and materials by airdrop, landing or cargo extraction systems.

The group re-equipped 1966 with long-range Douglas C-124 Globemaster II heavy airlifters, and performed intercontinental strategic airlift for Military Airlift Command, which became its mobilization gaining Command, as the 901st Military Airlift Group.

The group was once again realigned to be gained by TAC in 1972 as the 901st Tactical Airlift Group and equipped with Fairchild C-123K Provider assault transports in support of USAF Southern Command. It also assumed an aerial spraying mission which frequently took wing crews to Central America, the Caribbean, the Azores, North Africa, islands of the Pacific, and to many U.S. points for insect-spraying missions. The following year it moved to Westover Air Force Base, Massachusetts.

The group was inactivated 1974 when the 439th Tactical Airlift Wing was activated to take responsibility for Westover, which was transferred from Strategic Air Command to Air Force Reserve. The 731st Tactical Airlift Squadron was reassigned to the 439th, while its support units were inactivated and their personnel and equipment transferred to support units of the 439th.

The group was reactivated at Peterson Air Force Base, Colorado in October 1982 and equipped with Lockheed C-130B Hercules transports. Trained for tactical airlift missions, participating in joint training exercises. Inactivated April 1985, personnel and equipment to 302d Tactical Airlift Wing.

== Lineage ==
- Established as 901st Troop Carrier Group, Medium and activated on 15 January 1963 (not organized)

Organized in the Reserve on 11 February 1963
Redesignated 901st Military Airlift Group on 1 October 1966
Redesignated 901st Tactical Airlift Group on 1 July 1972
Inactivated on 1 April 1974

- Activated in the Reserve on 1 October 1982

Inactivated on 1 April 1985

=== Assignments ===
- Continental Air Command, 15 January 1963 (not organized)
- 94th Troop Carrier Wing (later Military Airlift Wing, Tactical Airlift Wing), 11 February 1963
- 302d Tactical Airlift Wing, 1 July 1972 – 1 April 1974
- 433d Tactical Airlift Wing, 1 October 1982 – 1 April 1985

=== Components ===
Operational squadron

- 731st Tactical Airlift Squadron (later Military Airlift Squadron, Tactical Airlift Squadron), 11 February 1963 – 1 April 1974, 1 October 1982 – 1 April 1985

Support units

- 901st Tactical Hospital (later USAF Dispensary, Tactical Dispensary, Tactical Clinic), 11 February 1963 – 1 April 1974; 1 October 1982 – 1 April 1985
- 39th Mobile Aerial Port Squadron, 1 October 1982 – 1 April 1985
- 901st Combat Support Squadron (later Support Squadron, Combat Support Squadron), 11 February 1963 – 1 April 1974; 1 October 1982 – 1 April 1985
- 901st Consolidated Aircraft Maintenance Squadron, 1 January 1967 – 1 April 1974, 1 October 1982 – 1 April 1985
- 901st Materiel Squadron, 11 February 1963 – 1 January 1967
- 901st Supply Squadron, 1 January 1967 – 15 October 1971
- 901st Aerial Port Flight (later Mobile Aerial Port Flight) 15 February 1964 – 30 June 1971, 1 December 1972 – 1 April 1974
- 901st Communications Flight, 1 June 1966 – 1 April 1974

=== Stations ===
- Laurence G. Hanscom Field, Massachusetts, 11 February 1963
- Westover Air Force Base, Massachusetts, 17 September 1973 – 1 April 1974
- Peterson Air Force Base, Colorado, 1 October 1982 – 1 April 1985

=== Aircraft ===
- Fairchild C-119 Flying Boxcar, 1963–1966
- Douglas C-124 Globemaster II, 1966–1972
- Fairchild C-123 Provider, 1972–1974
- Lockheed C-130 Hercules, 1982–1985

== See also ==
- List of United States Air Force Groups
- List of C-130 Hercules operators
