= North Carolina World War II Army Airfields =

North Carolina World War II Army Airfields

Site information
- Type: Army Airfields

Site history
- Built: 1940-1944
- In use: 1940-present

During World War II, the United States Army Air Forces (USAAF) established numerous airfields in North Carolina for antisubmarine defense in the Atlantic Ocean and for training pilots and aircrews of USAAF fighters and bombers.

Most of these airfields were under the command of Third Air Force or the Army Air Forces Training Command (AAFTC). However Troop Carrier Command and Air Technical Service Command (ATSC) commanded several other airfields in a support role.

It is still possible to find remnants of these wartime airfields. Many were converted into municipal airports, some were returned to agriculture and several were retained as United States Air Force installations and were front-line bases during the Cold War. Hundreds of the temporary buildings that were used survive today, and are being used for other purposes.

== Major Airfields ==
Troop Carrier Command

- Pope Field, Fort Bragg, Fayetteville

92d Army Air Force Base Unit (I TCC)
Was: Pope Air Force Base
Now: Pope Field

- Laurinburg-Maxton Army Air Base, Maxton

392d Army Air Force Base Unit
Glider training facility

Third Air Force

- Morris Field, Charlotte

30th Army Air Force Base Unit
Now: Charlotte Douglas International Airport and
Now: Charlotte Air National Guard Base

- Seymour Johnson Field, Goldsboro

333d Army Air Force Base Unit
Now: Seymour Johnson Air Force Base

- Bluethenthal Field, Wilmington

423d Army Air Force Base Unit
Now: Wilmington International Airport

Army Air Force Training Command
AAF Southeast Training Center

- Asheville-Hendersonville Army Air Field, Hendersonville

Joint Use USAAF/Contract Flying School
Also used by United States Navy

- Lindley Field/Greensboro-High Point MAP, Greensboro

Joint Use Civil Airport/USAAF/United States Navy

- Winston-Salem Airport, Winston-Salem

Joint Use Civil Airport/USAAF/United States Navy

Air Technical Service Command

- Raleigh-Durham AAF, Raleigh
