= 923rd Troop Carrier Group =

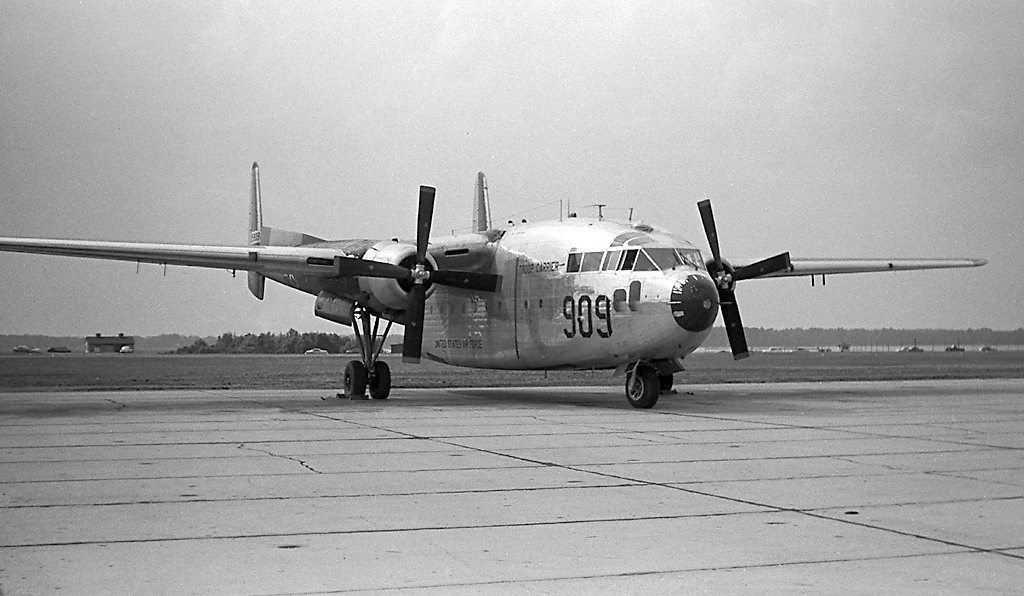
- C-119 Flying Boxcar as flown by the group
- Active: 1963-1965
- Country: United States
- Branch: United States Air Force
- Role: Airlift

The 923rd Troop Carrier Group is an inactive United States Air Force Reserve unit. It was last active with the 433rd Troop Carrier Wing at Carswell Air Force Base, Texas, where it was inactivated on 25 November 1965.

== History ==
=== Need for reserve troop carrier groups ===
After May 1959, the reserve flying force consisted of 45 troop carrier squadrons assigned to 15 troop carrier wings. (Note: There were an additional four rescue squadrons not assigned to the wings. Cantwell, p. 156) The squadrons were not all located with their parent wings, but were spread over thirty-five Air Force, Navy and civilian airfields under what was called the Detached Squadron Concept. The concept offered several advantages. Communities were more likely to accept the smaller squadrons than the large wings and the location of separate squadrons in smaller population centers would facilitate recruiting and manning. However, under this concept, all support organizations were located with the wing headquarters. Although this was not a problem when the entire wing was called to active service, mobilizing a single flying squadron and elements to support it proved difficult. This weakness was demonstrated in the partial mobilization of reserve units during the Berlin Crisis of 1961. To resolve this, at the start of 1962, Continental Air Command, (ConAC) determined to reorganize its reserve wings by establishing groups with support elements for each of its troop carrier squadrons. This reorganization would facilitate mobilization of elements of wings in various combinations when needed.

=== Activation of the 923rd Troop Carrier Group ===
As a result, the 923rd Troop Carrier Group was activated at Hensley Field, Texas on 17 January 1963 as the headquarters for the 69th Troop Carrier Squadron, which had been stationed there since November 1957. Along with group headquarters, a Combat Support Squadron, Materiel Squadron and a Tactical Infirmary were organized to support the 69th. Shortly after its organization, the group and its elements moved to nearby Carswell Air Force Base.

If mobilized, the group was gained by Tactical Air Command, which was also responsible for its training. Its mission was to organize, recruit and train Air Force reservists in the tactical airlift of airborne forces, their equipment and supplies and delivery of these forces and materials by airdrop, landing or cargo extraction systems.

The group was one of three groups assigned to the 433rd Troop Carrier Wing in 1963, the others being the 921st and 922nd Troop Carrier Group at Kelly Air Force Base, Texas

Operated at Carswell until November 1965 when inactivated as part of a ConAC reorganization of C-119 reserve units. Personnel eventually transferred to incoming 512th Troop Carrier Wing.

== Lineage ==
- Established as the 922nd Troop Carrier Group, Medium and activated on 28 December 1962 (not organized)

Organized in the Reserve on 17 January 1963
Inactivated on 25 November 1965

- Redesignated 922nd Military Airlift Group on 31 July 1985

=== Assignments ===
- Continental Air Command, 28 December 1962 (not organized)
- 433rd Troop Carrier Wing, 17 January 1963 – 25 November 1965

=== Components ===
- 69th Troop Carrier Squadron, 17 January 1963 – 25 November 1965

=== Stations ===
- Hensley Field, Texas, 17 January 1963
- Carswell Air Force Base, Texas, 2 February 1963 - 25 November 1965

=== Aircraft ===
- Fairchild C-119 Flying Boxcar, 1963-1965
