= 922nd Tactical Airlift Group =

922nd Tactical Airlift Group

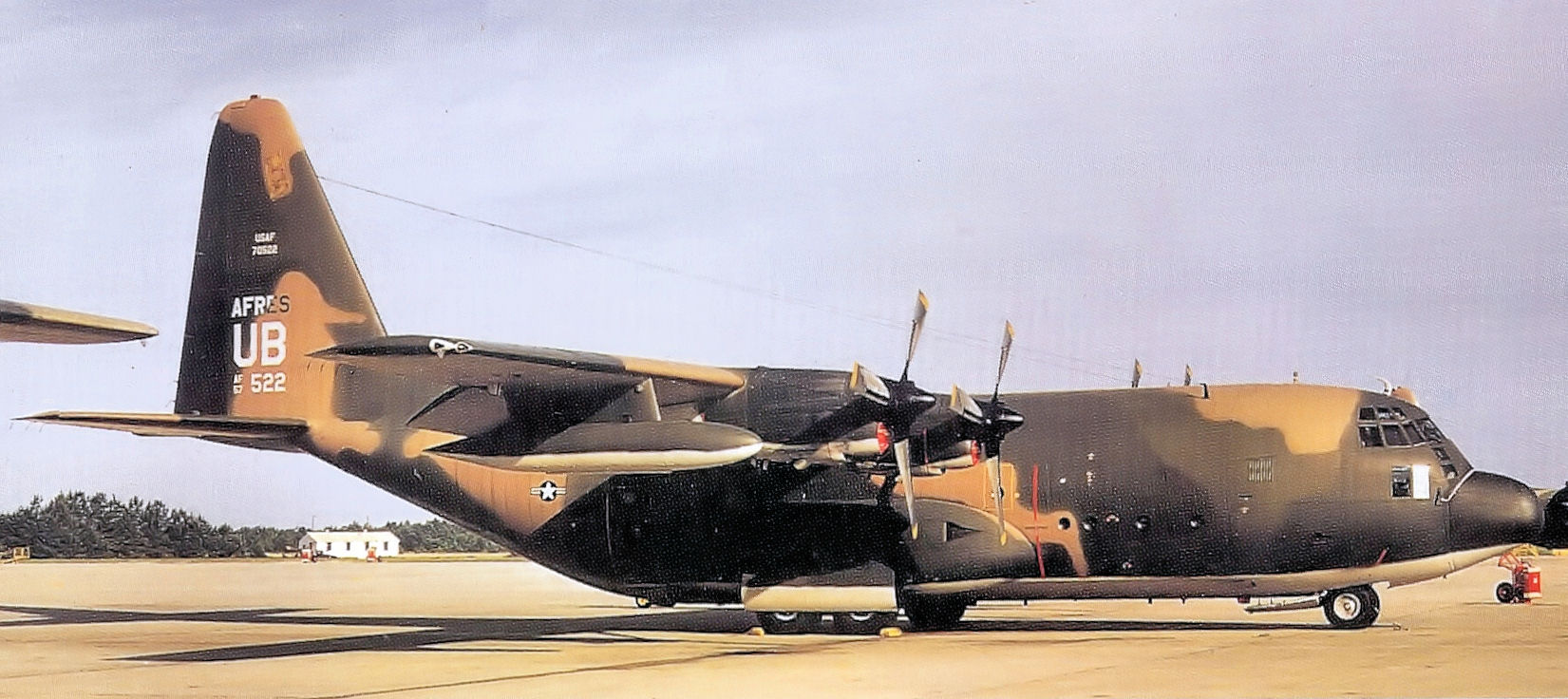
- C-130 Hercules of the Air Force Reserves (Note: Aircraft is Lockheed C-130A-55-LM Hercules serial 57-522, taken at Richards-Gebaur AFB about 1974.)
- Active: 1963-1974
- Country: United States
- Branch: United States Air Force
- Role: Airlift
- Part of: Air Force Reserve

The 922nd Tactical Airlift Group is an inactive United States Air Force Reserve unit. It was last active with the 433rd Tactical Airlift Wing, based at Kelly Air Force Base, Texas, where it was inactivated on 1 November 1994.

== History ==
=== Need for reserve troop carrier groups ===
After May 1959, the reserve flying force consisted of 45 troop carrier squadrons assigned to 15 troop carrier wings. (Note: There were an additional four rescue squadrons not assigned to the wings. Cantwell, p. 156) The squadrons were not all located with their parent wings, but were spread over thirty-five Air Force, Navy and civilian airfields under what was called the Detached Squadron Concept. The concept offered several advantages. Communities were more likely to accept the smaller squadrons than the large wings and the location of separate squadrons in smaller population centers would facilitate recruiting and manning. However, under this concept, all support organizations were located with the wing headquarters. Although this was not a problem when the entire wing was called to active service, mobilizing a single flying squadron and elements to support it proved difficult. This weakness was demonstrated in the partial mobilization of reserve units during the Berlin Crisis of 1961. To resolve this, at the start of 1962, Continental Air Command, (ConAC) determined to reorganize its reserve wings by establishing groups with support elements for each of its troop carrier squadrons. This reorganization would facilitate mobilization of elements of wings in various combinations when needed.

=== Activation of the 922nd Troop Carrier Group ===
As a result, the 922nd Troop Carrier Group was established at Kelly Air Force Base, Texas on 17 January 1963 as the headquarters for the 68th Troop Carrier Squadron, which had been stationed there since May 1960. Along with group headquarters, a Combat Support Squadron, Materiel Squadron and a Tactical Infirmary were organized to support the 68th.

If mobilized, the group was gained by Tactical Air Command (TAC), which was also responsible for its training. Its mission was to organize, recruit and train Air Force reservists in the tactical airlift of airborne forces, their equipment and supplies and delivery of these forces and materials by airdrop, landing or cargo extraction systems.

The group was one of three groups assigned to the 433rd Troop Carrier Wing in 1963, the others being the 921st Troop Carrier Group, also at Kelly, and the 923rd Troop Carrier Group at Carswell Air Force Base, Texas.

Trained throughout the 1960s with the Fairchild C-119 Flying Boxcar. In 1971, the groups aged aircraft were retired, and replaced by more modern Lockheed C-130A Hercules transports. It participated in conducting the USAF's C-130A model Hercules pilot, navigator, flight engineer and loadmaster school. It also trained for tactical airlift missions, participating in joint training exercises. It provided airlift of Department of Defense personnel, supplies, and equipment worldwide. Inactivated in June 1974, with its 68th Squadron and remaining personnel and aircraft being assigned to the 921st Tactical Airlift Group at Kelly.

== Lineage ==
- Established as the 922nd Troop Carrier Group, Medium and activated on 28 December 1962 (not organized)

Organized in the Reserve on 17 January 1963
Redesignated: 922nd Tactical Airlift Group on 1 July 1967
Inactivated on 30 June 1974

=== Assignments ===
- Continental Air Command, 28 December 1962 (not organized)
- 433rd Troop Carrier Wing (later 433rd Tactical Airlift Wing), 17 January 1963 – 30 June 1974

=== Components ===
- 68th Troop Carrier Squadron (later 68th Military Airlift Squadron, 68th Tactical Airlift Squadron), 17 January 1963 – 30 June 1974

=== Stations ===
- Kelly Air Force Base, Texas, 17 January 1963 – 30 June 1974

=== Aircraft ===
- Fairchild C-119 Flying Boxcar, 1963–1971
- Lockheed C-130 Hercules, 1971–1974

== Notes ==
=== Bibliography ===
- Cantwell, Gerald T. (1997). Citizen Airmen: a History of the Air Force Reserve, 1946-1994. Washington, D.C.: Air Force History and Museums Program. ISBN 0-16049-269-6.
- Maurer, Maurer, ed. (1982) [1969]. Combat Squadrons of the Air Force, World War II (PDF) (reprint ed.). Washington, DC: Office of Air Force History. ISBN 0-405-12194-6. LCCN 70605402. OCLC 72556.
- Mueller, Robert (1989). Air Force Bases, Vol. I, Active Air Force Bases Within the United States of America on 17 September 1982 (PDF). Washington, DC: Office of Air Force History. ISBN 0-912799-53-6.
- Ravenstein, Charles A. (1984). Air Force Combat Wings, Lineage & Honors Histories 1947-1977. Washington, DC: Office of Air Force History. ISBN 0-912799-12-9.
