= 68th Airlift Squadron =

68th Airlift Squadron

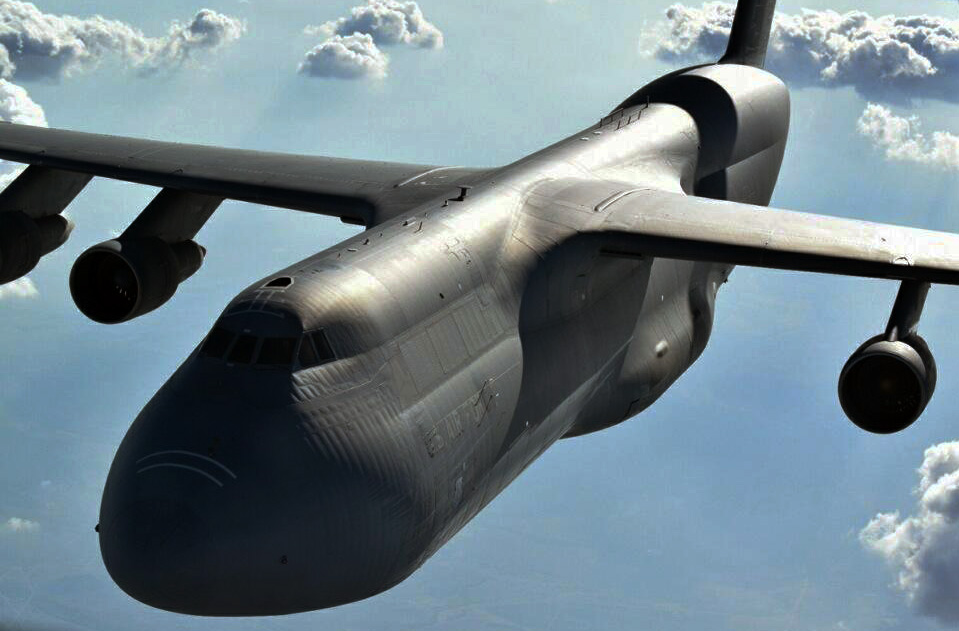
- Squadron C-5 Galaxy approaches a tanker during air refueling
- Active: 1943–1946; 1947–1952; 1955–present
- Country: United States
- Branch: United States Air Force
- Role: Airlift
- Part of: Air Force Reserve Command
- Garrison/HQ: Lackland Air Force Base, Joint Base San Antonio, Kelly Field Annex
- Motto(s): Nulli Secundis Latin Second to None
- Engagements: Southwest Pacific Theater; Desert Storm
- Decorations: Air Force Outstanding Unit Award; Philippine Presidential Unit Citation

Insignia
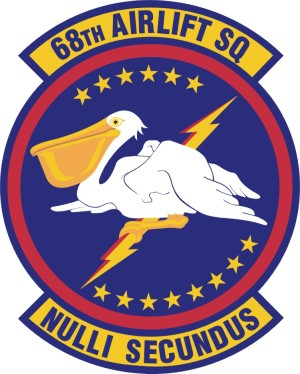
- 68th Airlift Squadron emblem (approved 7 July 1961)

The 68th Airlift Squadron is a United States Air Force Reserve squadron, assigned to the 433d Operations Group, stationed at Kelly Field Annex, Joint Base San Antonio, Texas. The squadron operates Lockheed C-5M Super Galaxy aircraft providing global airlift. If mobilized, the wing is gained by Air Mobility Command.

== History ==
=== World War II ===
The 68th flew troop carrier missions in New Guinea, Philippines, and the western Pacific from 1943 to 1945 and participated in the airborne assault at Aparri, Luzon, 23 June 1945.

=== Activation in the reserve and Korean War mobilization ===
The squadron was activated in the reserve in 1947 and conducted flying training until it was mobilized in 1950. It served on active duty until 1952, moving to Germany in 1951.

=== Reserve airlift operation ===
Between 1955 and 1985, the squadron trained for and flew tactical airlift missions at home and abroad, often taking part in joint exercises, humanitarian airlift operations, and firefighting missions.

In 1985, it converted to strategic airlift missions. The 68th took part in Operation Just Cause in 1989–1990, flying medical supplies, tanks, and field rations to Panama. The squadron also took part in the defense of Saudi Arabia and liberation of Kuwait in 1990 and 1991, airlifting men and materiel destined for southwestern Asia.

== Lineage ==
- Constituted as the 68th Troop Carrier Squadron on 22 January 1943

Activated on 9 February 1943
Inactivated on 15 January 1946

- Activated in the reserve on 3 August 1947

Redesignated 68th Troop Carrier Squadron, Medium on 27 June 1949
Ordered into active service on 15 October 1950
Inactivated on 14 July 1952

- Activated in the reserve on 18 May 1955

Redesignated 68th Tactical Airlift Squadron on 1 July 1967
Redesignated 68th Military Airlift Squadron on 1 April 1985
Redesignated 68th Airlift Squadron on 1 February 1992

=== Assignments ===
- 433d Troop Carrier Group, 9 February 1943 – 15 January 1946
- 433d Troop Carrier Group, 3 August 1947 – 14 Jul 1952
- 433d Troop Carrier Group, 18 May 1955
- 433d Troop Carrier Wing, 14 April 1959
- 922d Troop Carrier Group (later 922d Tactical Airlift Group), 17 January 1963
- 921st Tactical Airlift Group, 30 June 1974
- 433d Tactical Airlift Wing (later 433d Military Airlift Wing, 433d Airlift Wing), 1 November 1974
- 433d Operations Group, 1 August – present

=== Stations ===
- Florence Army Air Field, South Carolina, 9 February 1943
- Sedalia Army Air Field, Missouri, 19 March 1943
- Laurinburg–Maxton Army Air Base, North Carolina, 9 June 1943
- Baer Field, Indiana, 1–15 August 1943
- Port Moresby Airfield Complex, New Guinea, c. 1 September 1943
- Nadzab Airfield Complex, New Guinea, c. 15 November 1943 (detachment operated from Tadji, New Guinea, 18 May-4 June 1944)
- Biak, Netherlands East Indies, 15 November 1944 (detachment operated from Nadzab, New Guinea until 5 January 1945)
- Tanauan, Leyte, Philippines, c. 15 February 1945
- Clark Field, Luzon, Philippines, c. 15 June 1945
- Iwo Jima, Volcano Islands, 25 August 1945
- Ie Shima, Ryuku Islands, c. 10 September 1945
- Tachikawa Air Base, Japan, c. 30 September 1945 – 15 January 1946
- Cleveland Municipal Airport, Ohio, 3 August 1947
- Greenville AFB (later Donaldson Air Force Base), South Carolina, 16 October 1950 – 20 July 1951
- Rhein-Main Air Base, Germany, 6 August 1951 – 14 July 1952
- Brooks Air Force Base, Texas, 18 May 1955
- Kelly Air Force Base (later Kelly Field Annex, Lackland Air Force Base, Joint Base Lackland-San antonio), Texas, 21 May 1960 – present

=== Aircraft ===
- Douglas C-47 Skytrain (1943–1945)
- Boeing B-17 Flying Fortress (1944)
- Curtiss C-46 Commando (1944–1945, 1949–1950, 1955–1958)
- Beechcraft T-11 Kansan (1948–1951)
- Beechcraft T-7 Navigator (1949–1951)
- Fairchild C-119 Flying Boxcar (1950–1952, 1958–1971)
- North American T-28 Trojan (1955)
- Beechcraft C-45 Expeditor (1955–1958)
- Lockheed C-130 Hercules (1971–1985)
- Lockheed C-5 Galaxy (1985–present)
