= Laurinburg–Maxton Army Air Base =

Inactive USAAF base, closed 1945

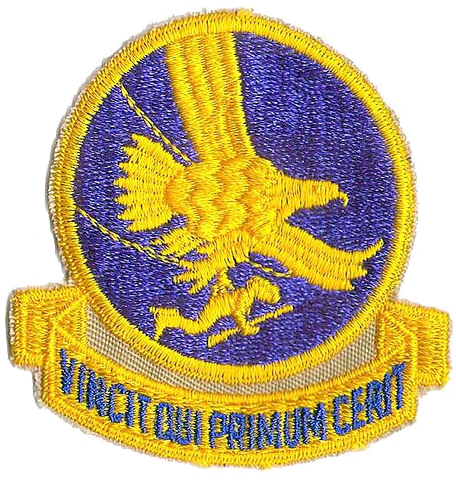
Laurinburg–Maxton Army Air Base
- Part of I Troop Carrier Command
- Laurinburg, North Carolina
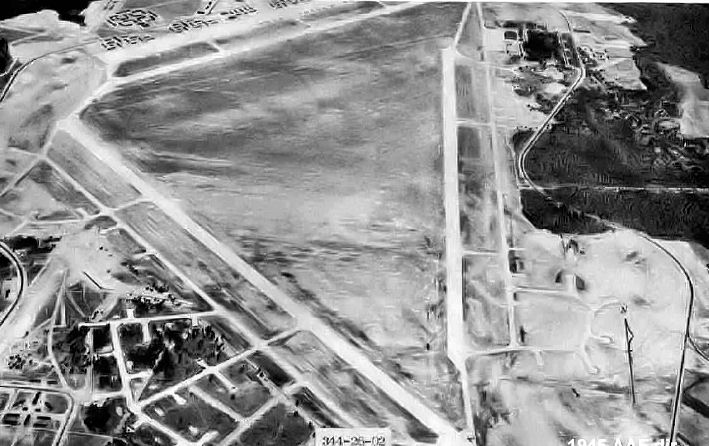
- Laurinburg–Maxton Army Air Base – 26 Feb 1944

Location
- Location of Laurinburg–Maxton Army Air Base
- Coordinates: 34°47′31″N 079°21′57″W

Site history
- Built by: United States Air Force
- In use: 1943–1945
- Battles/wars: World War II

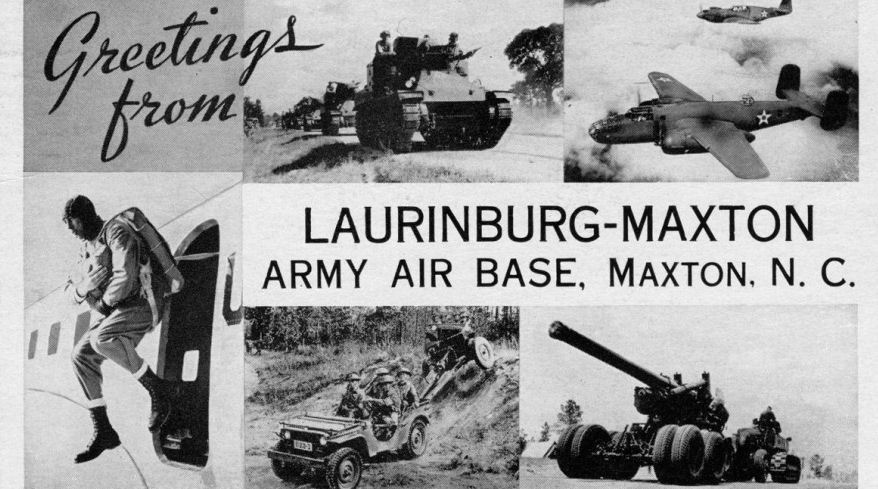
1943 postcard from Laurinburg–Maxton Army Air Base

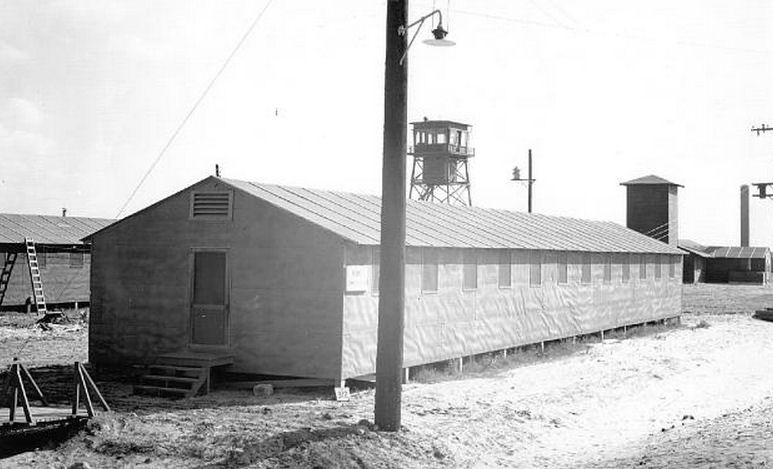
Wartime tar paper barracks commonly found on temporary training airfields such as Laurinburg–Maxton

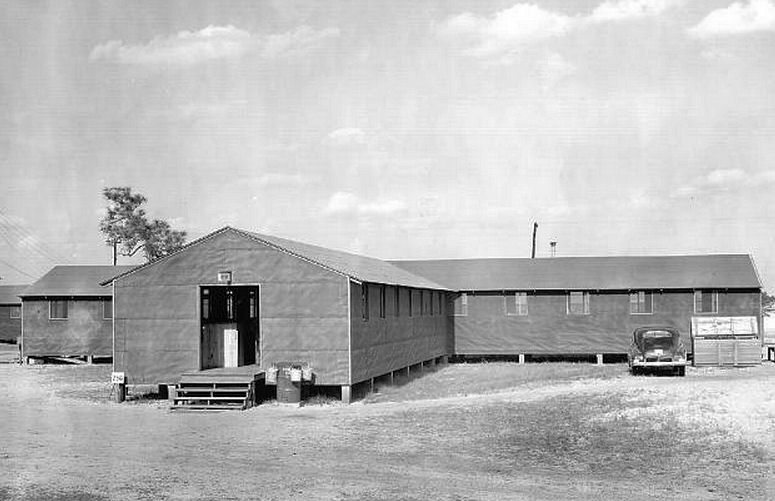
A common type of building found were orderly rooms and ground training classrooms such as this.

Laurinburg–Maxton Army Air Base is an inactive United States Air Force base, approximately 6 miles east-northeast of Laurinburg, North Carolina. It was active during World War II as a I Troop Carrier Command training airfield.

The Laurinburg–Maxton Airbase was the largest Waco CG-4A glider pilot training base in the world. It was closed on 30 October 1945

== History ==
Local citizens in the Laurinburg and Maxton area of North Carolina learned in December 1941 that the Federal Government wanted to locate an Air Training School in the vicinity of Maxton. The local governments petitioned the War Department and Civil Aeronautics Administration (CAA) to have some type of airfield built in their area in early 1942 to help in the war effort. The plan was to build the airfield with local funds and money supplied by the CAA and the Works Progress Administration (WPA). The War Department would have control of the facility and use of it for the duration of the war, and afterwards the airfield would become a public airport. Eventually an agreement was made in May 1942, and a combination of four local purchased 583 acres to lease to the government to be used as a military reservation. However, the local governments had to acquire several parcels of land under private ownership, which were long held by the families which owned them for generations.

Construction was authorized on 20 April 1942, and almost immediately, work on the airfield was begun. Much of the labor was provided through the WPA. Engineers were surveying out the site, water wells were dug and preparations were underway to build a railroad spur to the facility. The base was planned to be a large, expansive facility designed to house 10,000 men. The cost was over ten million dollars and netted 20 miles of paved roads within the compound.

Over the next several months construction workers moved in from around the country. Grading for the runways and site preparation for the support station began in June and by the end of October 1942, most of the major construction was completed. Three long 6,500-ft runways were constructed in a triangle configuration, oriented N/S, NE/SW and SW/NE. Also four auxiliary airfields were established for support airfields:

- Knollwood Airfield
- Lumberton Airfield
- North Pine Airfield
- Pinehurst Airfield

Construction of a station facility consisted of a large number of buildings based on standardized plans and architectural drawings, with the buildings designed to be the "cheapest, temporary character with structural stability only sufficient to meet the needs of the service which the structure is intended to fulfill during the period of its contemplated war use" was underway. To conserve critical materials, most facilities were constructed of wood, concrete, brick, gypsum board and concrete asbestos. Metal was sparsely used. The station was designed to be nearly self-sufficient, with not only hangars, but barracks, warehouses, hospitals, dental clinics, dining halls, and maintenance shops were needed. There were libraries, social clubs for officers, and enlisted men, and stores to buy living necessities. Many residents of Scotland County worked in civilian capacities at the base, which provided them with a secure source of income.

The new Army Air Force base was opened in late October 1942 and was named "Laurinburg–Maxton Army Air Base". It was placed under the jurisdiction of I Troop Carrier Command with a mission to train and equip glider airborne units for coordinated training with Army paratroop, infantry, artillery, engineers and medical units.

=== C-47 and glider pilot training ===
The first unit to train at Laurinburg–Maxton was the 317th Troop Carrier Group, which arrived in early November 1942. This was followed shortly by the Army 88th Airborne Infantry Battalion, which later was re-designated as the 88th Glider Infantry Regiment. Known units which trained at the base are:

- 375th Troop Carrier Group (55th, 56th, 57th, 58th TCS), May–June 1943
- 876th Airborne Engineer Aviation Battalion, May-July 1943
- 38th Troop Carrier Squadron (10th TCG), June–September 1943; January–April 1944 (Operational Training Unit)
- 67th Troop Carrier Squadron (433d TCG), June–August 1943
- 68th Troop Carrier Squadron (433d TCG), June–August 1943
- 69th Troop Carrier Squadron (433d TCG), June–August 1943
- 70th Troop Carrier Squadron (433d TCG), June–August 1943
- 435th Troop Carrier Group (75th, 76th, 77th, 78th TCS), July-August 1943
- 436th Troop Carrier Group (79th, 80th, 81st, 82d TCS), August–December 1943
- 438th Troop Carrier Group (87th, 88th, 89th TCS), October 1943 – January 1944
- 439th Troop Carrier Group (91st, 92d, 93d, 94th TCS), December 1943 – February 1944

On 1 May 1944 the 392d Army Air Force Base Unit took over the training mission at the base, and unit operational training was replaced by individual replacement training (RTU) by the AAF Glider Training School. Over 40 Army and Air Force units trained at the base by the end of the war in 1945, including both the 82d Airborne and 101st Airborne Divisions.

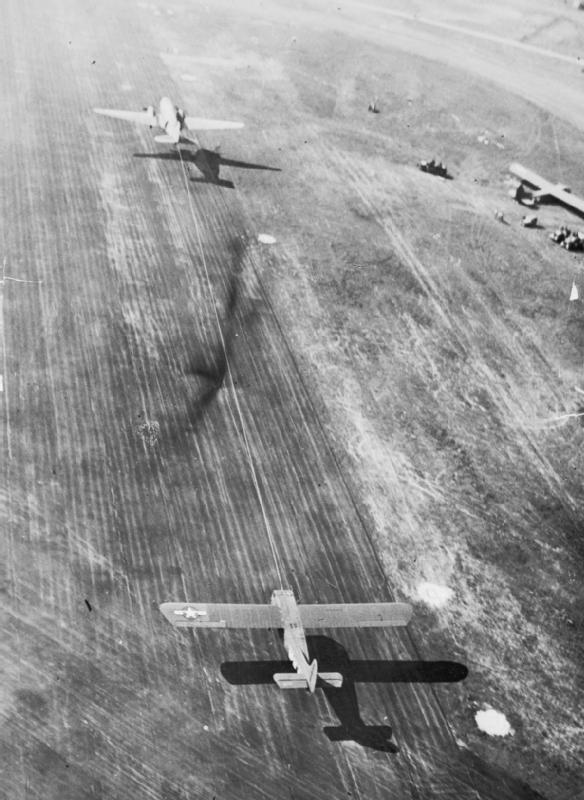
C-47 and a CG-4A Waco glider taking off

Visits by high-ranking Army and Air Force officers were common at the base, which meant parades and troops passing in review drills were frequent. Generals Dwight D. Eisenhower and George Marshall visited Laurinburg–Maxton on several occasions during the war, to observe units performing parachute and glider training. Demonstrations were frequently made for the distinguished visitors. The demonstrations impressed the visitors and did much to give confidence to the Generals about the capability of the soldiers and airmen of the airborne forces. Units and personnel which trained at the base were deployed to North Africa as part of the Operation Torch landings in French West Africa in November 1942, as well as the invasions of Sicily and Italy in the summer of 1943.

In early 1944, the mission of Laurinburg–Maxton AAB was changed to train student officers in advanced glider techniques and ground fighting. Also the training of C-47 pilots in towing the CG-4A Waco gliders, which were developed for the planned Normandy invasion in June. Training in glider towing was previously conducted at Bowman Field, Kentucky, near Fort Campbell; the proximity to Fort Bragg by Laurinburg–Maxton and the Army airborne school there added a second school. The first glider pilot training class began on 2 June 1944, just four days prior to the Normandy Invasion.

The CG-4A Waco glider, was by the standards of 1944, huge. It could carry 13 fully equipped soldiers; a jeep with a 4-man crew and equipment, or a 75mm howitzer plus supplies and ammunition. It had a wingspan of over eighty feet and weighed over 4,000 pounds when empty. Manufactured primarily of wood, medal tubing and canvas, it was towed into the air by C-47s which connected to it by a tow rope that also carried basic communications between the glider and aircraft. Designed by Waco aircraft and some other companies, they were manufactured by Ford Motor Company at their Kingsford, Michigan production plant in northwest Michigan by the thousands. It was a well-designed aircraft and had good aerodynamics.

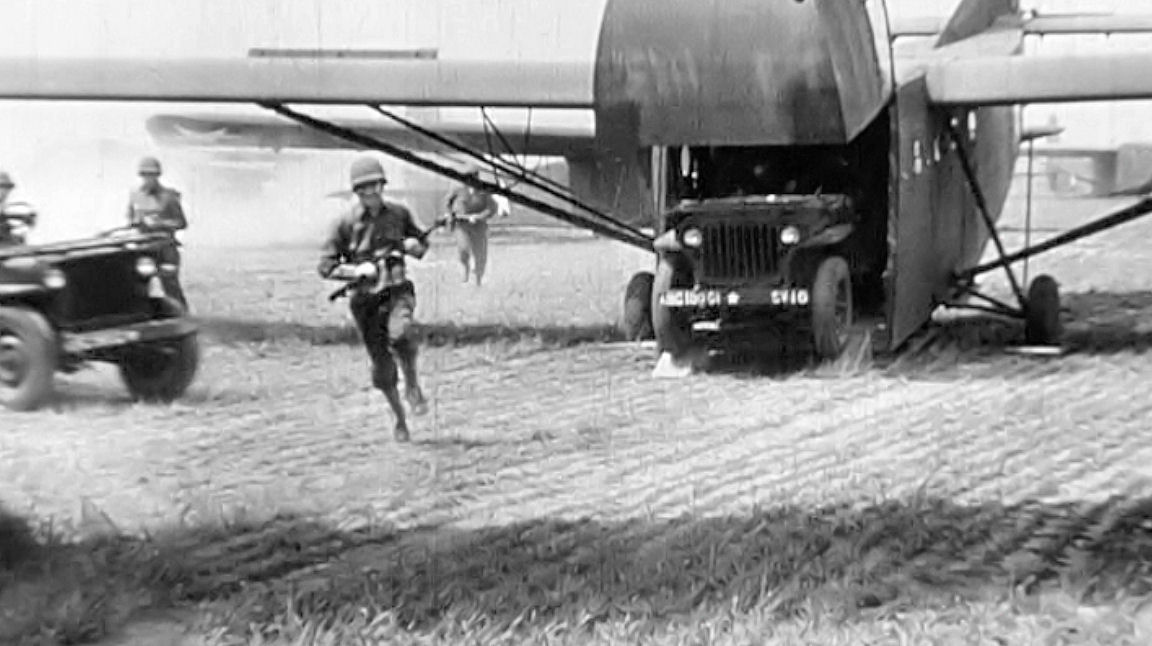
Airborne troops and a jeep coming out of a CG-4A after landing

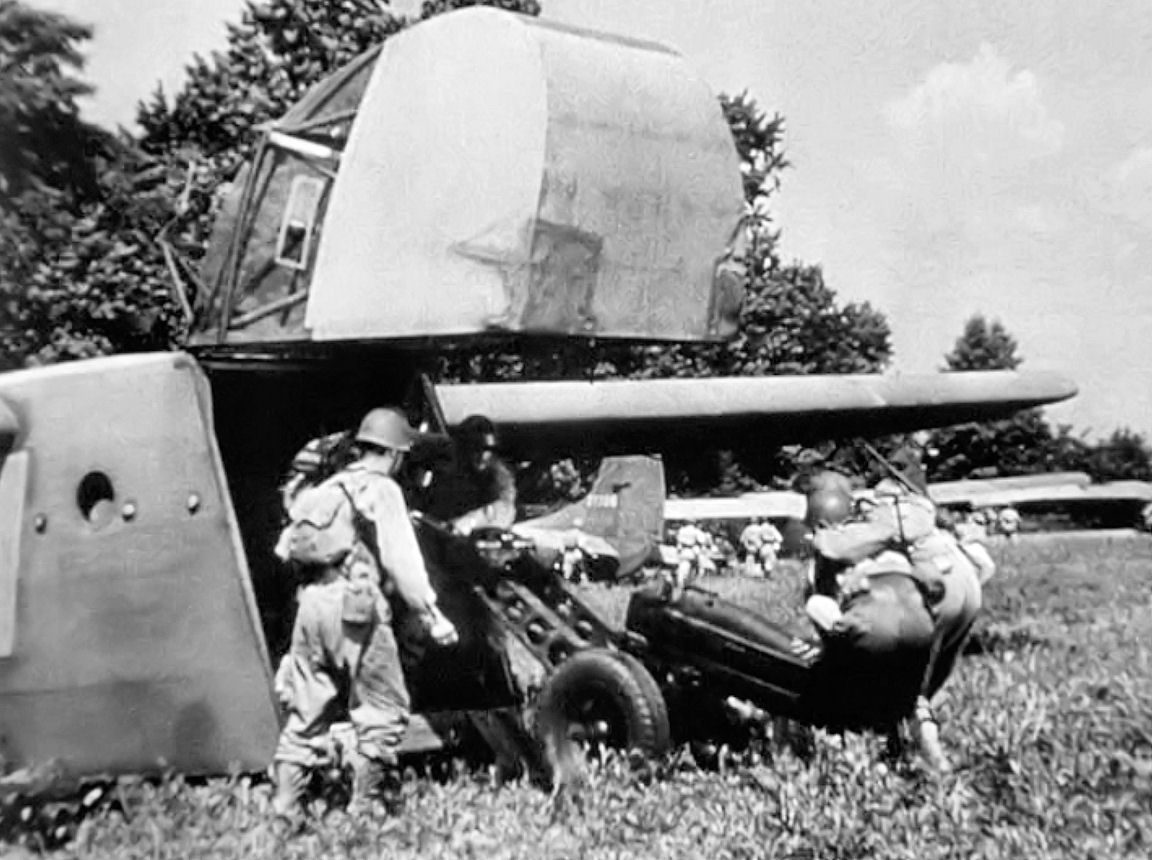
Artillery being unloaded after glider landing

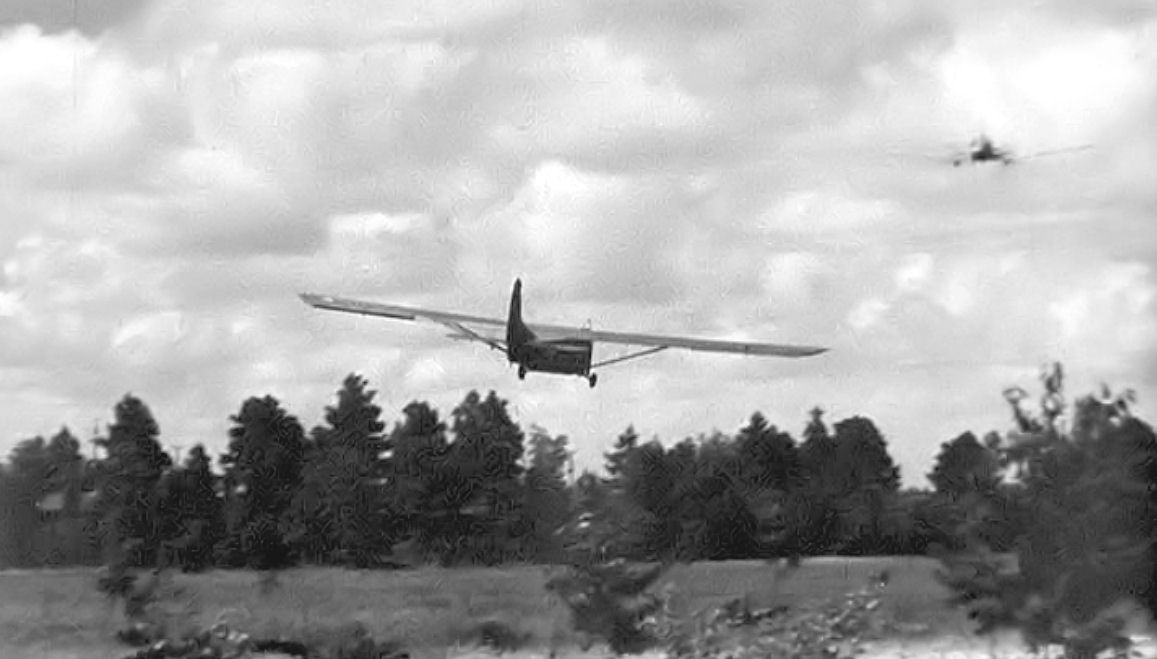
CG-4A Waco glider taking off from a small field after the tow rope being "snatched" by the C-47

The training course for Air Force glider pilots was an eight-week program. Their primary instruction was to fly the glider behind the tow aircraft and successfully land the unpowered aircraft. However, were also trained as combat soldiers, as once the glider landed they were as vulnerable in combat as the airborne infantry they carried. Besides the flying training, glider pilots were trained to fire the M1 carbine; "Bazooka" rocket launchers, various sub-machine guns (M3, Thompson), 60 and 80mm mortars, and the use of hand grenades. They took part in Army tactical exercises using maps, compass, setting booby-traps, camouflage and participated in extensive physical training. Over time, the course curriculum was changed to add tank hunting and jungle reconnaissance, and glider reorganization after landing in enemy territory. Also the study of weapons and battle habits of Japanese soldiers. Also, a water glider "ditching" facility was set up at a large pond near the base named Lee's Mill, where water ditchings were practiced.

In addition to the training of glider pilots, training was given to C-47 pilots, although most resources were allocated to tow training and glider pilots who often landed in the grass section of the airfield inside the three runways. The curriculum consisted of ground and flying training, which included weight and balance instruction (the towing C-47 also carried airborne parachutists), meteorology, boarding and cargo lashdown procedures, radio code, preflighting both the C-47 and the glider, flying the C-47 while towing the glider and much night flying practice.

One of the more interesting concepts taught at the base was the "snatch pick-up" which was used to retrieve gliders on the ground by C-47s flying over them. This technique was important as gliders (which were undamaged after landing) were loaded with wounded soldiers from an open field where a runway did not exist. The glider could be "snatched" and pulled into the air by the tow plane. This was often used in remote locations such as Burma and later after the Normandy landings in France and in the Philippines.

Besides the CG-4, a larger glider, the Waco CG-13 was manufactured in limited quantities. Four of them were based at the Lumberton, North Carolina auxiliary airfield for training use. Two of the C-13s were damaged and unusable, however beginning in June 1943, training with one was performed at the Army Airborne training school at Camp Mackall.

=== Closure ===
As the war began drawing to an end in Europe, and later in the summer of 1945 in the Pacific, the number of trainees and the level of activity at the base was reduced rapidly. With the Japanese surrender and the end of World War II most of the temporary training bases such as Laurinburg–Maxton Army Air Base were put on inactive status and eventually closed.

Activity diminished over the summer of 1945 as people began being discharged or transferred to other bases, and the former thriving military complex began to take on the appearance of a ghost town. In early September, just after the Japanese surrender, the base population was just over 3,700 personnel, down from the 10,000 or so in April. By the end of the September, it was down to 914. In October the base received notice that it would be inactivated by the end of the month.

=== Laurinburg–Maxton Air Base today ===
When the base closed it was converted to civilian uses. The airfield was redeveloped into the civil Laurinburg–Maxton Airport. From time to time, Army airborne units based at Fort Bragg use the airfield just like their predecessors did in the 1940s. Several wartime buildings remain at the airport, including the large hangars built in 1944. Lee Mills Pond remains, as many of the revetments around the airfield where C-47s were parked.

The airfield was regularly used as a pursuit driving track for the North Carolina Highway Patrol Basic school cadets from the 1960s through the early 1990s. As demand for the airport's usage for aviation increased, that coupled with the antiquated nature of the setting and increased training needs prompted the state to fund a new and certified pursuit driving track operated by the NC Highway Patrol, but for use by all NC law enforcement agencies. The new facility is in southeast Raleigh, near the Highway Patrol Training Center in Garner. Local antipathy against the Highway Patrol by area Lumbee Indians from the riots in Robeson County in the 1960s was blamed for patrol cars being vandalized at the Maxton facility on numerous occasions over the decades.

The former base can be easily accessed from Interstate 74/U.S. Route 74 exit 190 and turning north on "Airport Road". Part of the support station is used as a growing industrial park, with large manufacturing plants constructed, although many streets of the support station still remain in poor repair, half a century of vegetation brush and pine tree growth now covering the former facility. The base hospital became the Scotland Memorial Hospital, although today the hospital is in a new, modern facility about six miles southeast of the airport off I-74. Most of the other base buildings were torn down or sold off and moved over time. The base chapel remains on the former base and is still in use as the Skyway Baptist Church.

== See also ==
- North Carolina World War II Army Airfields
- I Troop Carrier Command

== Works cited ==
- Manning, Thomas A. (2005), History of Air Education and Training Command, 1942–2002. Office of History and Research, Headquarters, AETC, Randolph AFB, Texas OCLC 71006954, 29991467
- Shaw, Frederick J. (2004), Locating Air Force Base Sites, History’s Legacy, Air Force History and Museums Program, United States Air Force, Washington DC. OCLC 57007862, 1050653629
- Stewart, John Douglas; Stewart, Sara (2001). Scotland County. Arcadia Publishing. ISBN 9780738513584.
