= Tanauan Airfield =

World War II airfield in Leyte, Philippines

Tanauan Airfield
- Part of Fifth Air Force
- Tanauan Airfield (Philippines)

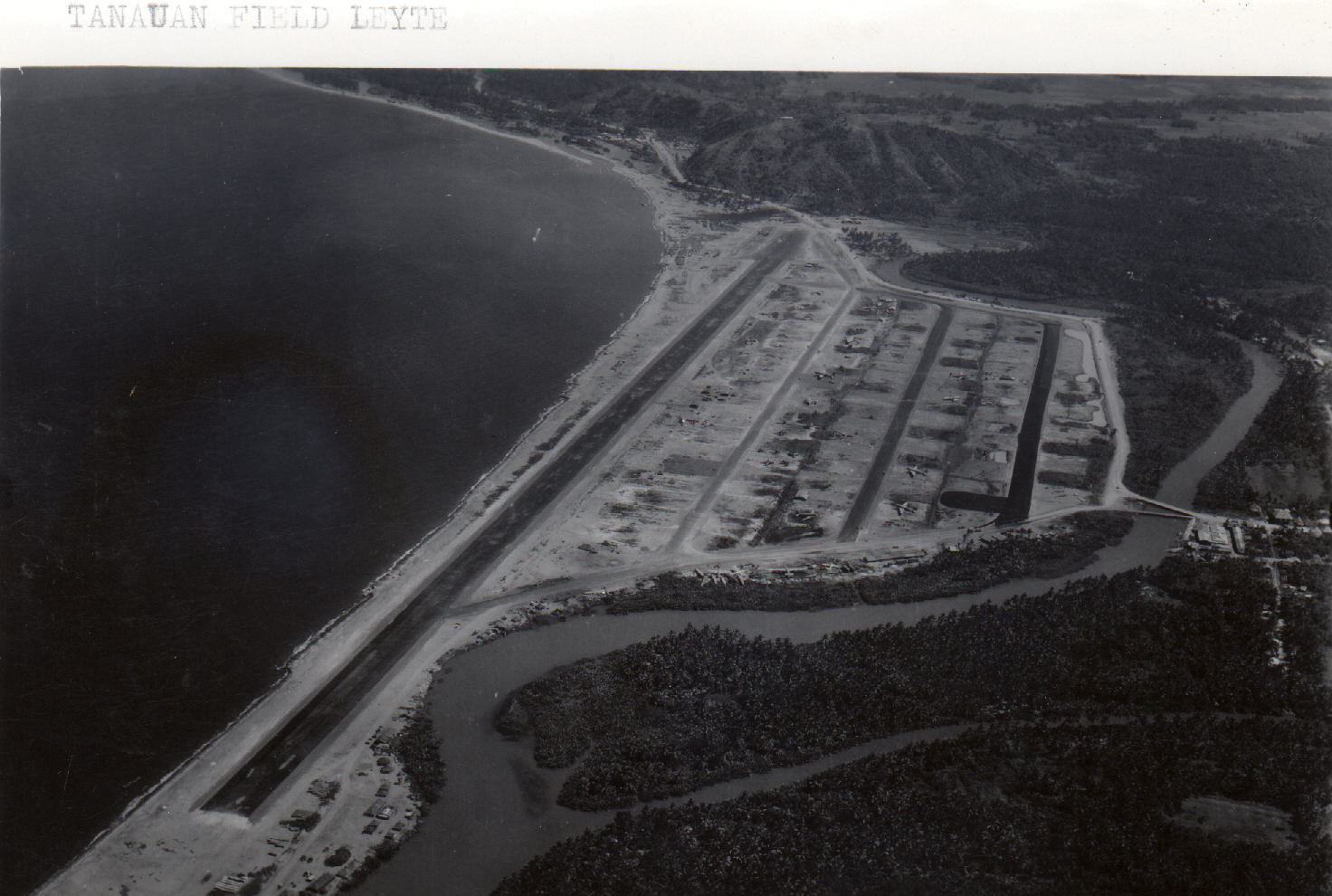
- Aerial view of Tanauan airfield, Leyte, Philippines

Site information
- Type: Military airfield
- Controlled by: United States Army Air Forces

Location
- Coordinates: 11°06′15.11″N 125°01′14.08″E

Site history
- Built: 1943
- In use: 1943-1944

Tanauan Airfield is a World War II airfield located near Tanauan in the province of Leyte, Philippines. It was closed after the war.

== History ==
The airfield was built by the Americans shortly after landing on Leyte in November 1944. It was used by the 312th Bombardment Group (19 November 1944 - 10 February 1945) and 433d Troop Carrier Group (19 January - 31 May 1945).

With the withdrawal of American forces, the airfield was abandoned. There is little or no trace of its existence.

== See also ==
- USAAF in the Southwest Pacific
