= 433rd Airlift Wing =

433rd Airlift Wing

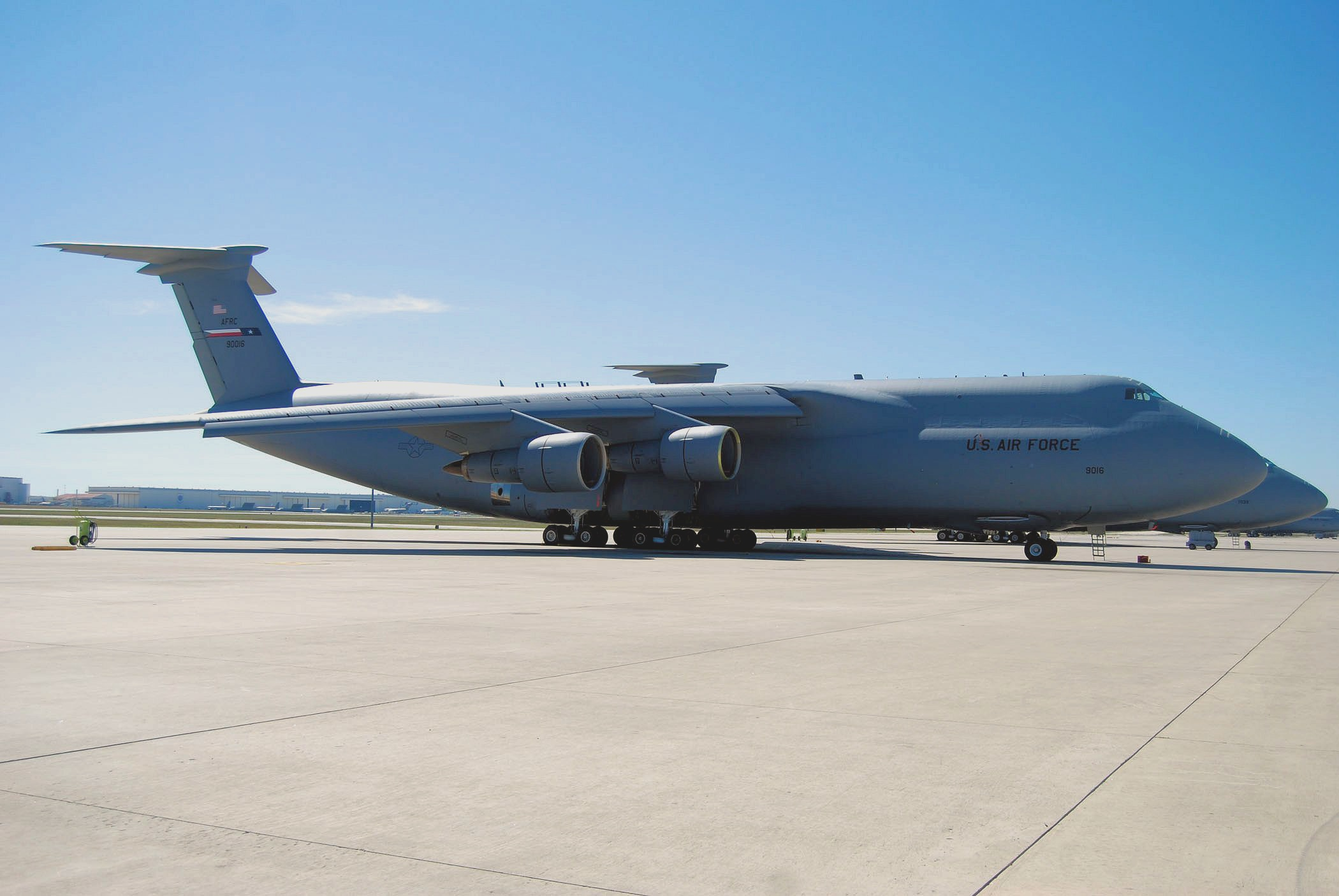
- 433rd Airlift Wing – C-5A Galaxy 69-0016
- Active: 1949–1952; 1955–present
- Country: United States
- Branch: United States Air Force
- Type: Wing
- Role: Airlift
- Size: 3,400
- Part of: Air Force Reserve Command
- Garrison/HQ: Kelly Field Annex, Joint Base San Antonio, Texas
- Nickname: The Alamo Wing
- Decorations: Air Force Outstanding Unit Award; Republic of Vietnam Gallantry Cross with Palm

Commanders
- Current commander: Colonel Douglas C. Jeffrey IV

Insignia
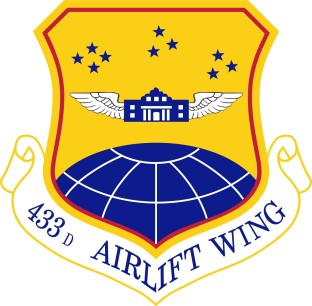
- 433rd Airlift Wing emblem (Note: Approved 4 August 1995.)

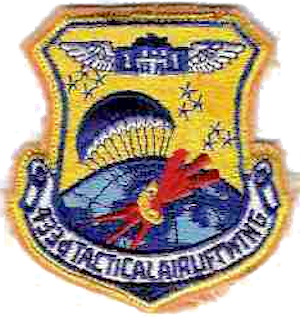
- Patch with 433rd Troop Carrier Wing emblem (Note: Approved 7 July 1961.)
- Tail stripe: Forward, blue with white star; aft, red and white (Texas flag)

Aircraft flown
- Transport: C-5M Super Galaxy

The 433rd Airlift Wing, officially 433d Airlift Wing, is an Air Reserve component of the United States Air Force. It is assigned to Fourth Air Force, Air Force Reserve Command, stationed at Kelly Field Annex, Joint Base San Antonio, Texas. If mobilized, the wing is gained by Air Mobility Command.

== Overview ==
The 433rd Airlift Wing, the "Alamo Wing", organizes, equips and trains its approximately 3,100 ready reservists to achieve combat readiness according to training standards established by Air Mobility Command (AMC) and Air Education and Training Command (AETC).

The wing performs peacetime missions and Air Expeditionary Force tasking compatible with Air Force Reserve Command training requirements and maintenance of mobilization readiness. When mobilized, the 433rd Airlift Wing provides the aircraft, crews, support personnel and equipment necessary to meet combat readiness objectives established by the Joint Chiefs of Staff, AMC, AETC and the gaining theater Combatant Commanders.

The Alamo Wing is also the Air Force Reserve's only Formal Training Unit (FTU) providing initial and advanced Lockheed C-5M Super Galaxy flight qualification for the total force – Reserve and Active Duty.

== Units ==
The 433rd Airlift Wing consists of the following major units:

433rd Operations Group

- 68th Airlift Squadron (68 AS) – C-5M Super Galaxy
- 356th Airlift Squadron (356 AS) – C-5M Super Galaxy
- 733rd Training Squadron (733 TRS)

433rd Maintenance Group

433rd Mission Support Group

433rd Medical Group

C-5M Formal Training Unit

The C-5 Formal Training Unit consists of both a student squadron, the 733rd Training Squadron and an instructor squadron, the 356th Airlift Squadron. These squadrons are directly responsible for getting the next generation of Reserve and Active-Duty C-5M Super Galaxy aircrew members fully qualified as pilots, engineers and loadmasters.

== History ==
=== Initial activation and Korean War service ===
The wing was first activated in the reserve as the 433rd Troop Carrier Wing, replacing the 12th Air Division at Cleveland Municipal Airport on 27 June 1949 when Continental Air Command (ConAC) reorganized its reserve units under the wing base organization system. The ConAC reorganization also reflected President Truman’s reduced 1949 defense budget, which required reductions in the number of units in the Air Force, The wing was manned at 25% of normal strength but its combat group was authorized four squadrons rather than the three of active duty units. The wing flew various trainer aircraft and Curtiss C-46 Commandos.

The wing, along with all reserve combat and corollary units, was mobilized for the Korean war. It was part of the first wave to be mobilized. (Note: The 452nd Bombardment Wing and 437th Troop Carrier Wing were the only reserve units mobilized for the Korean War before the 433rd. Cantwell, p. 87.) Upon activation in October 1950, the wing moved to Greenville Air Force Base (later Donaldson Air Force Base), South Carolina, receiving Fairchild C-119 Flying Boxcar aircraft the following month. The wing began tactical training in March 1951. It airlifted personnel and supplies to United States Army units in the field. It also Airdropped personnel and equipment during army exercises.

The 433rd left Donaldson in July 1951 and arrived at Rhein-Main Air Base, Germany in early August. In Europe, it participated with U.S., British, and French units in field training. In July 1952, the wing was inactivated and its mission, personnel and equipment were assumed by the 317th Troop Carrier Wing, which was simultaneously activated at Rhein-Main.

=== Troop carrier operations in Texas ===
The Air Force desired that all reserve units be designed to augment the regular forces in the event of a national emergency. There were six reserve pilot training wings that had no mobilization mission, including the 8707th Pilot Training Wing at Brooks Air Force Base, Texas. On 18 May 1955, the 8707th was discontinued and replaced by the reactivated 433rd Troop Carrier Wing, again flying Curtiss Commandos.

During the first half of 1955, the Air Force had begun detaching Air Force Reserve squadrons from their parent wing locations to separate sites. The concept offered several advantages: communities were more likely to accept the smaller squadrons than the large wings and the location of separate squadrons in smaller population centers would facilitate recruiting and manning. In time, the Detached Squadron Program proved successful in attracting additional participants In keeping with this program, although the 67th and 68th Troop Carrier Squadrons were activated with wing headquarters at Brooks, when the 69th Troop Carrier Squadron was activated in March 1956, it was stationed at Tinker Air Force Base, Oklahoma.

The wing flew airlift missions and participated in numerous training exercises, sometimes with special operations units. In the summer of 1956, the wing participated in Operation Sixteen Ton during its two weeks of active duty training. Sixteen Ton was performed entirely by reserve troop carrier units and moved United States Coast Guard equipment From Floyd Bennett Naval Air Station to Isla Grande Airport in Puerto Rico and San Salvador in the Bahamas. After the success of this operation, the wing began to use inactive duty training periods for Operation Swift Lift, transporting high priority cargo for the air force and Operation Ready Swap, transporting aircraft engines, between Air Materiel Command's depots.

The Joint Chiefs of Staff were pressuring the Air Force to provide more wartime airlift. At the same time, about 150 Fairchild C-119 Flying Boxcars became available from the active force. Consequently, in November 1956 the Air Force directed ConAC to convert three fighter bomber wings to the troop carrier mission by September 1957. Cuts in the budget in 1957 also led to a reduction in the number of reserve wings from 24 to 15. In the adjustments resulting from these decisions, in November 1957, the 69th Squadron at Tinker transferred its aircraft and personnel to the newly activated 305th Troop Carrier Squadron, then moved on paper to Naval Air Station Dallas, where it took the place of the 448th Fighter-Bomber Wing, which was inactivated along with all its components. The wing finally replaced its C-46s with Flying Boxcars at this time as well.

With the closure of Brooks' runways and transition to a non-flying installation in 1960, the wing elements at Brooks moved the short distance to Kelly Air Force Base.

=== Activation of groups under the wing ===
Although the dispersal of flying units was not a problem when the entire wing was called to active service, mobilizing a single flying squadron and elements to support it proved difficult. This weakness was demonstrated in the partial mobilization of reserve units during the Berlin Crisis of 1961 To resolve this, at the start of 1962, ConAC determined to reorganize its reserve wings by establishing groups with support elements for each of its troop carrier squadrons. This reorganization would facilitate mobilization of elements of wings in various combinations when needed. However, as this plan was entering its implementation phase, another partial mobilization occurred for the Cuban Missile Crisis. The formation of troop carrier groups was delayed until January 1963 for wings that had not been mobilized. The 906th and 922nd Troop Carrier Group at Kelly, and the 923rd Troop Carrier Group at Carswell were all assigned to the wing on 17 January.

In February 1963, the 923rd Troop Carrier Group moved to Carswell Air Force Base, Texas. Two months later, it was joined at Carswell by the 916th Troop Carrier Group, which moved from Donaldson Air Force Base, South Carolina. The 916th, unlike the wing's other groups, however, operated the Douglas C-124 Globemaster II, and in July, the group was reassigned to the 442nd Troop Carrier Wing, although it remained at Carswell.

By the mid-1960s, the wing was flying global airlift missions, as well as conducting the USAF's Lockheed C-130A Hercules pilot, navigator, flight engineer and loadmaster school. Between 1971 and 1985, the wing trained for tactical airlift missions, participating in joint training exercises. It provided airlift of Department of Defense personnel, supplies, and equipment worldwide.

The 433rd assisted the U.S. Forest Service by use of the Modular Airborne FireFighting System. It airlifted other units overseas for deployments and conducted humanitarian airlift operations. Between 1977 and 1985, the wing rotated personnel and aircraft periodically to Howard Air Force Base in the Panama Canal Zone. In 1985, it became the first Air Force reserve wing to fly the Lockheed C-5A Galaxy, the largest USAF operational aircraft, and changed from a tactical to a strategic airlift missions. It also began training for air refueling. It tested a C-5A modified to transport space vehicles and in 1989 airlifted the Hubble Space Telescope from California to Kennedy Space Center, Florida.

The Alamo Wing played a major role in providing aeromedical evacuation support as well as cargo relief during Operation Just Cause the operation to remove Manuel Noriega as president of Panama. In 1989. The wing was also a primary participant in Operation Desert Shield and Desert Storm when the wing's C-5As helped fly the massive airlift of supplies, heavy Army combat equipment, and troops to the Persian Gulf in 1990–91. Additionally, 1,400 wing reservists of various career fields were called up to active duty and more than 500 deployed overseas in support of the conflict. Following the war, the wing participated in Operation Provide Comfort, when the airlift of food and supplies provided much-needed relief to the beleaguered Kurds of Turkey.

=== Post Cold War era ===
The wing also assisted in Operation Provide Hope by transporting critical cargo to the Commonwealth of Independent States. And in 1992–93, the 433rd AW was the first reserve wing to fly relief missions and provide medical support to famine stricken Somalia during Operation Restore Hope.

The Alamo Wing again flew missions into Africa, this time to aid refugees fleeing Rwanda in 1994. In the same year, it helped in efforts to restore democracy in Haiti, and supported operations to halt renewed Iraqi aggression against Kuwait during Operation Phoenix Jackal.

The wing played a critical role in Operation Joint Endeavor, hauling hundreds of tons of cargo as well as hundreds of duty passengers to Europe in support of NATO's peace initiative in Bosnia. Further, the 433rd AW became the first Reserve wing to deploy personnel to Germany, Hungary and Bosnia for 179 days as part of Joint Endeavor's support contingent—39 members of the 433rd Aeromedical Evacuation Squadron. Then, in late 1996, the wing participated in Operation Desert Strike to once again help halt renewed threats by Iraq on the Kurdish population. In 1998, the wing was called again to participate in Operations Phoenix Scorpions I – III and in Operation Desert Fox when Iraq refused to cease manufacturing weapons of mass destruction.

In early 1999, the Alamo Wing responded to another area of the world that threatened the peace and security, again in the Balkans. Wing C-5s and aircrews airlifted essential cargo and passengers to support the NATO-led Operation Allied Force to halt Serbia’s policy of ethnic cleansing in neighboring Kosovo. After the peace accord with Serbia, the wing assisted in NATO’s efforts to resettle ethnic Albanians into a secure environment.

The final C-5A Galaxy aircraft (tail number 70-0448) departed Kelly Field on 28 September 2016. The first of the eight Lockheed Martin C-5M Super Galaxy aircraft, arrived June 2016.

=== Global War on Terrorism ===
The Alamo Wing once again responded to a national crisis in the immediate aftermath of terrorist 11 September attacks on the World Trade Center in New York City and the Pentagon. Hauling thousands of tons of cargo in support of America’s War on Terrorism, the wing proved yet again that it stands ready to answer the call whenever the United States faces a threat to its homeland and vital national interests.

Over the years, the wing has also flown many humanitarian relief missions to aid victims of natural disasters, the latest being Central American aid in the wake of Hurricane Mitch.

=== C-5 Galaxy Formal Training Unit ===
On 1 July 2007, the wing's 356th Airlift Squadron assumed a training mission, becoming the Air Force Reserve's only Formal Training Unit (FTU) providing initial and advanced C-5M flight qualification for Air Mobility Command and Air Force Reserve Command aircrews, assuming a training role that had been previously assigned to the regular Air Force's 97th Air Mobility Wing at Altus Air Force Base, Oklahoma. Over 70 selectively manned aircrew instructors train and produce up to 500 aircrew members in nine different curricula for pilots, loadmasters and flight engineers. Additional training functions and support are provided by the colocated 733rd Training Squadron Both squadrons are assigned to the wing's 433rd Operations Group. In addition to being the sole C-5 training organization for the entire US Air Force, the 356 AS also continues to provides airlift support for peacetime, contingency and humanitarian operations.

== Lineage ==
- Established as the 433rd Troop Carrier Wing, Medium on 10 May 1949

Activated in the reserve on 27 June 1949
Ordered to active service on 15 October 1950
Inactivated on 14 July 1952

- Activated in the reserve on 18 May 1955

Redesignated 433rd Tactical Airlift Wing on 1 July 1967
Redesignated 433rd Military Airlift Wing on 25 July 1969
Redesignated 433rd Tactical Airlift Wing on 29 June 1971
Redesignated 433rd Military Airlift Wing on 1 April 1985
Redesignated 433rd Airlift Wing on 1 February 1992

=== Assignments ===
- Ninth Air Force, 27 June 1949
- First Air Force, 1 August 1950
- Tactical Air Command, 16 October 1950
- Eighteenth Air Force, 1 June 1951 (attached to Twelfth Air Force, 5 – 7 August 1951
- Twelfth Air Force, 8 August 1951 – 14 July 1952
- Fourteenth Air Force, 18 May 1955
- Tenth Air Force, 25 March 1958
- Fourth Air Force Reserve Region, 1 September 1960
- Central Air Force Reserve Region, 31 December 1969
- Fourth Air Force, 8 October 1976 – present

=== Components ===
Groups

- 433rd Troop Carrier Group (later 433rd Operations Group): 27 June 1949 – 14 July 1952; 18 May 1955 – 14 April 1959; 1 August 1992 – present
- 901st Tactical Airlift Group: 1 October 1982 – 1 April 1985
- 908th Tactical Airlift Group: 1 March 1968 – 25 April 1969
- 916th Troop Carrier Group (later 916th Military Airlift Group): 18 March-1 July 1963; 21 April 1971 – 8 July 1972
- 921st Troop Carrier Group (later 921st Tactical Airlift Group, 921st Military Airlift Group): 17 January 1963 – 26 January 1968; 2 June 1969 – 1 November 1974
- 922nd Troop Carrier Group (later 922nd Tactical Airlift Group): 17 January 1963 – 30 June 1974
- 923rd Troop Carrier Group: 17 January 1963 – 25 November 1965
- 924th Tactical Airlift Group: 1 July 1972 – 1 April 1981
- 926th Tactical Airlift Group: 1 March 1968 – 1 October 1969
- 929th Troop Carrier Group: 1 January 1964 – 1 July 1966
- 934th Tactical Airlift Group: 1 October 1981 – 1 April 1985

Squadrons

- 67th Troop Carrier Squadron: 14 April 1959 – 17 January 1963
- 68th Troop Carrier Squadron (later 68th Tactical Airlift Squadron): 14 April 1959 – 17 January 1963; 1 November 1974 – 1 August 1992
- 69th Troop Carrier Squadron: 14 April 1959 – 17 January 1963
- 705th Tactical Airlift Training Squadron: 1 July 1972 – 30 Jun 1976

=== Stations ===
- Cleveland Municipal Airport, Ohio, 27 June 1949
- Greenville Air Force Base (later Donaldson Air Force Base), South Carolina, 16 October 1950 – 20 July 1951
- Rhein-Main Air Base, West Germany, 5 August 1951 – 14 July 1952
- Brooks Air Force Base, Texas, 18 May 1955
- Kelly Air Force Base (later Kelly Annex, Lackland Air Force Base, Joint Base San Antonio), Texas 1 November 1960 – present

=== Aircraft ===
- North American T-6 Texan (1949–1950)
- Beechcraft T-7 Navigator(1949–1950)
- Beechcraft T-11 Wichita (1949–1950)
- Curtiss C-46 Commando, (1949–1950) (1955–1958)
- Fairchild C-119 Flying Boxcar (1950–1952, 1957–1971)
- North American T-28 Trojan (1955)
- Douglas C-124 Globemaster II (1963, 1966–1972)
- Lockheed C-130 Hercules (1971–1985)
- Lockheed C-5A Galaxy (1985–2016)
- Lockheed C-5M Super Galaxy (2016–Present)
