= 85th Military Airlift Squadron =

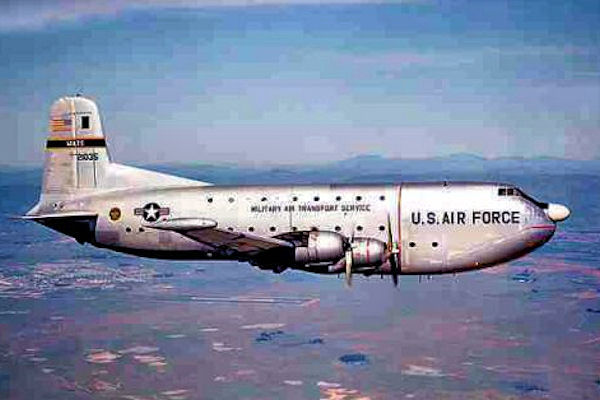
- A Douglas C-124C Globemaster II in MATS markings
- Active: 1943; 1952-1967
- Country: United States
- Branch: United States Air Force
- Type: Strategic Airlift
- Motto: Efficiency by Experience

Insignia
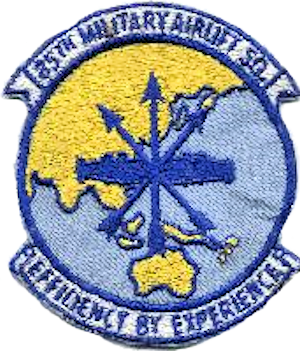
- Patch with 85th Military Airlift Squadron emblem

The 85th Military Airlift Squadron is an inactive United States Air Force unit. Its last assignment was to the 60th Military Airlift Wing, Military Airlift Command at Travis Air Force Base, California, where it was inactivated on 8 July 1967.

== History ==
The squadron was first activated during World War II as a ferrying unit in Canada along the ALSIB route. The unit was disbanded and, along with the 84th Transport Squadron, replaced by Station 19, Alaskan Wing, Air Transport Command in September 1943 in a general reorganization of Air Transport Command.

Reestablished in July 1952, assuming the assets of the Military Air Transport Service (MATS) 1287th Air Transport Squadron, it was initially equipped with Douglas C-54 Skymasters flying the transport route to Alaska. Re-equipped with Douglas C-124 Globemaster II intercontinental strategic transports in 1953.

Primary mission was to transport personnel, equipment and supplies to Elmendorf Air Force Base, Alaska and return to Great Falls. When MATS ended operations at Great Falls Air Force Base, was transferred to Travis Air Force Base, California, continued Alaska support operations as well as flying airlift operations throughout the Pacific. It flew routine flights to Japan, Hawaii, Alaska and other points in Asia, including transport flights to Indochina and Karachi in Pakistan.

During the 1960s, resources were almost solely devoted to the transport of equipment and personnel to South Vietnam.

It was inactivated in 1967 with the phaseout of the C-124.

=== Lineage ===
- Constituted as the 85th Ferrying Squadron

Activated c. 1 March 1943
Redesignated 85th Transport Squadron c. 29 March 1943

- Disbanded on 20 September 1943
- Reconstituted as the 85th Air Transport Squadron, Medium on 1 July 1952

Activated on 20 July 1952
Redesignated 85th Air Transport Squadron, Heavt on 7 August 1952
Redesignated 85th Military Airlift Squadron on 8 January 1966
Inactivated on 8 July 1967

=== Assignments ===
- 25th Ferrying Group, c. 1 March 1943 – 20 September 1943
- 1701st Air Transport Group, 20 July 1952
- 1501st Air Transport Group, 1 May 1953
- 1501st Air Transport Wing, 18 January 1953
- 60th Military Airlift Wing, 8 January 1966 – 8 July 1967

=== Stations ===
- Namao Airport, Alberta, Canada, c. 1 March 1943 – 20 September 1943
- Great Falls Air Force Base, Montana, 20 July 1952
- Travis Air Force Base, California, 20 Nov 1953 – 8 July 1967

=== Aircraft ===
- Douglas C-54 Skymaster, 1952-1953
- Douglas C-124 Globemaster II, 1953-1967
