= 75th Expeditionary Airlift Squadron =

75th Expeditionary Airlift Squadron

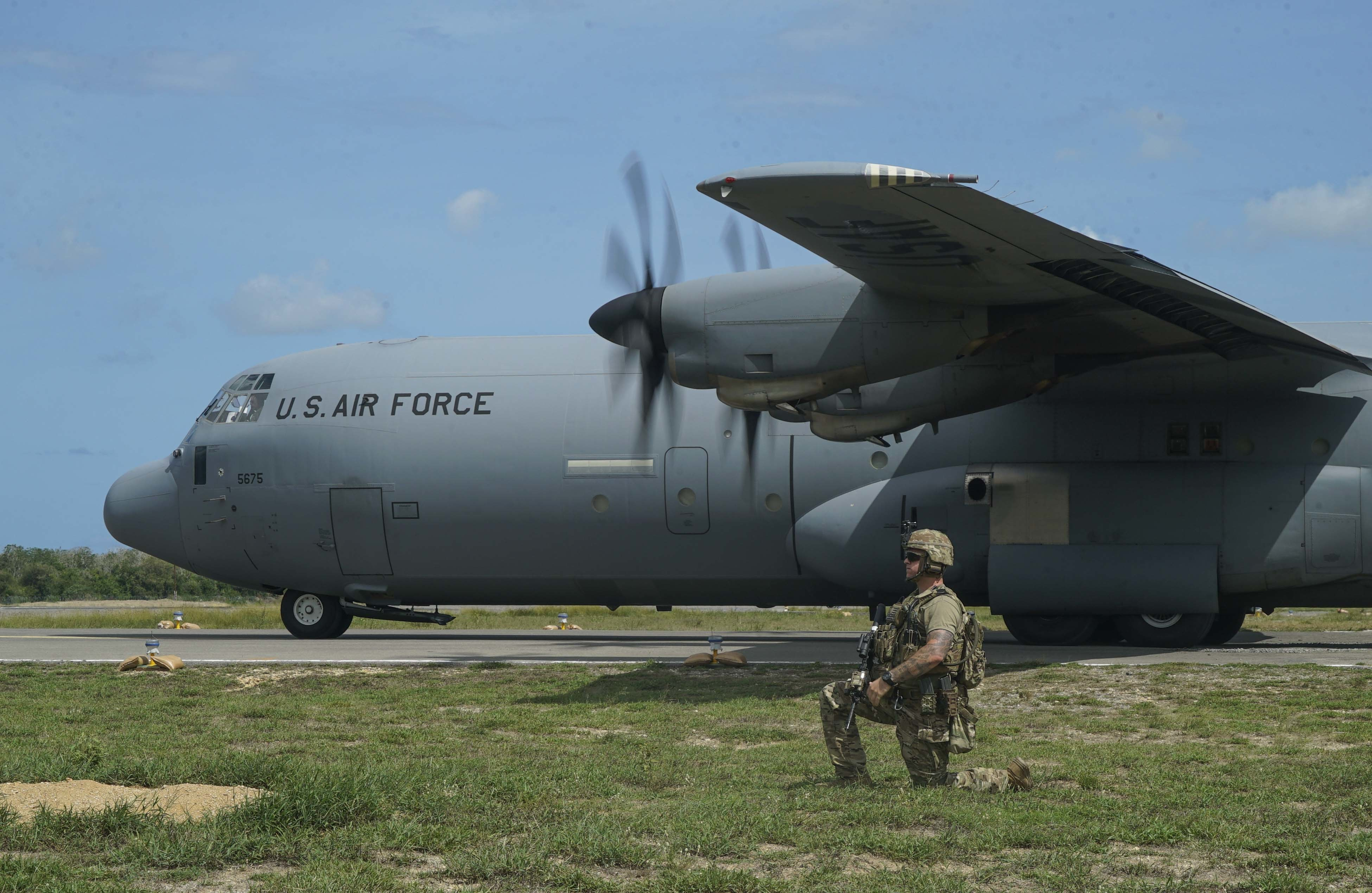
- A squadron C-130J Super Hercules resupplies US forces in Kenya, 2020
- Active: 1943–1944; 1952–2003; 2014–present
- Country: United States
- Branch: United States Air Force
- Role: Airlift
- Part of: United States Air Forces in Europe – Air Forces Africa: Third Air Force; 406th Air Expeditionary Wing; 449th Air Expeditionary Group
- Garrison/HQ: Camp Lemonnier, Djibouti
- Nickname: Rogue Squadron
- Motto: Sustinere est Defendere (Latin for 'To Support is to Defend')
- Engagements: World War II – American Theater Armed Forces Expeditionary: Panama, 1989–1990

- Decorations: Air Force Outstanding Unit Award (9x) Republic of Vietnam Gallantry Cross with Palm

Insignia
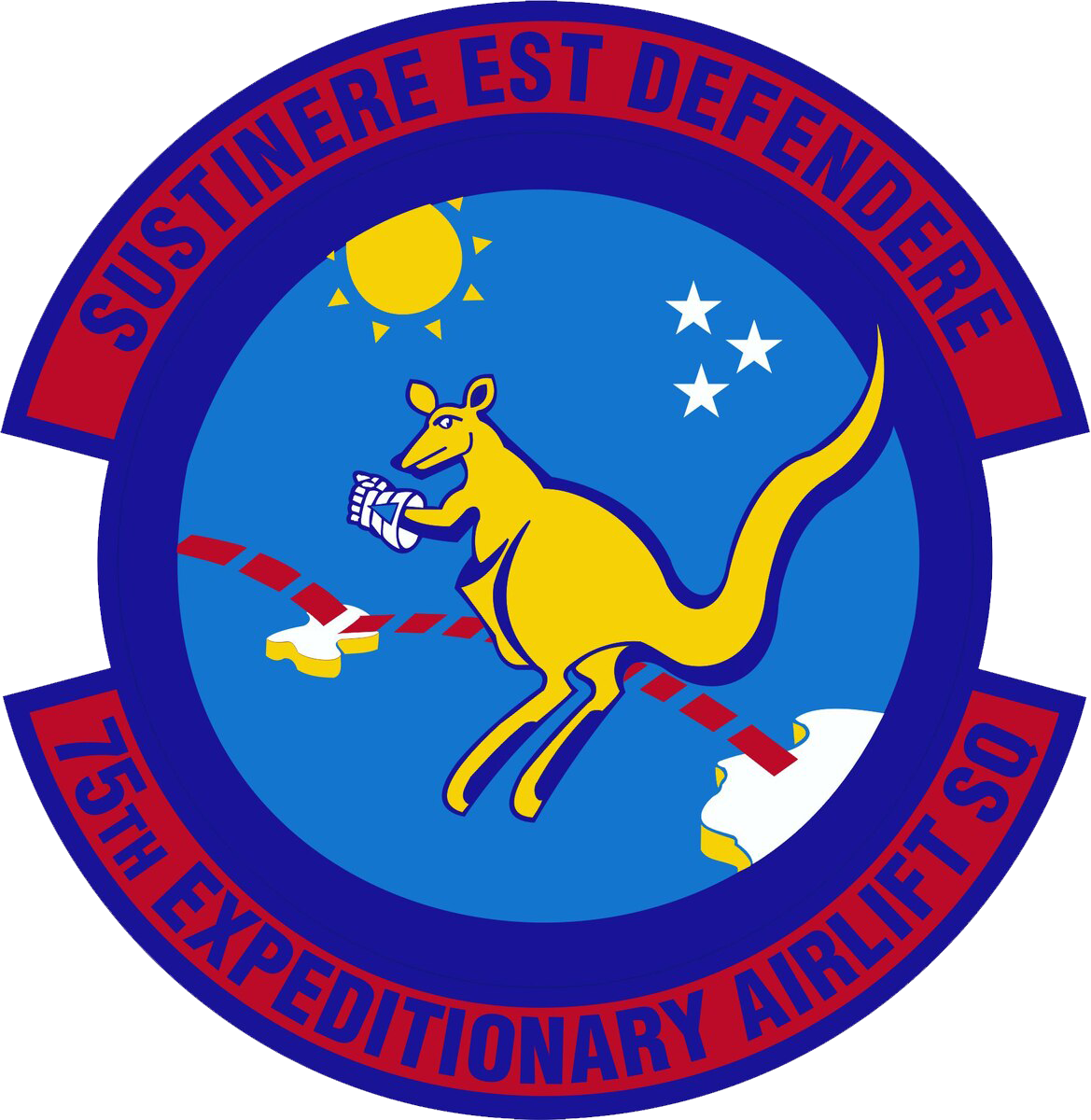
- 75th Expeditionary Airlift Squadron emblem (Note: Approved 5 February 2015.)

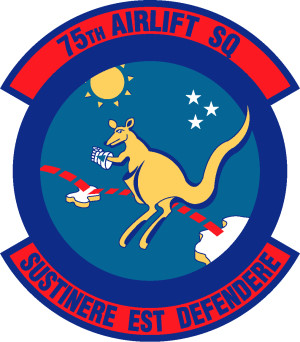
- 75th Airlift Squadron emblem (Note: Approved 3 November 1959. This emblem was replaced on 28 November 1961, but was restored on 30 April 1962. Description: On a Medium Blue Disc bordered Air Force Blue, an Air Force Golden Yellow sun issuing from dexter chief and three White stars in sinister chief, above a small land area in dexter and a larger one issuing from sinister base, both White and edged Air Force Golden Yellow, and connected by a Red dotted line; over all, a caricatured Air Force Golden Yellow kangaroo in profile, jumping, outlines and details Air Force Blue, wearing a White mailed gauntlet on his left forepaw; outlines and details Air Force Blue throughout.)

The 75th Expeditionary Airlift Squadron is a provisional Air Force squadron. It was most recently activated in May 2014 in Djibouti, where it provides airlift support for Combined Joint Task Force – Horn of Africa. It replaced the 52d Expeditionary Airlift Squadron. The 75th is made up of rotating Air Force Reserve Command and Air National Guard units, such as the 910th Airlift Wing, members of which comprised the squadron in May 2022.

The squadron was first activated as the 75th Ferrying Squadron in 1943 it transported cargo. It was redesignated the 75th Transport Transition Squadron later that year and trained aircrews on transport aircraft until being disbanded the following year.

The 75th was reconstituted as the 75th Air Transport Squadron in 1952. It operated heavy airlift aircraft, primarily in the Pacific area until 1993.

Prior to its conversion to provisional status it was last assigned to the 86th Airlift Wing at Ramstein Air Base, Germany, where it operated Douglas C-9A Nightingale aircraft providing theater medical evacuation airlift in Europe until 2003.

== History ==
=== World War II ===
Initially formed by Air Transport Command in early 1943 at Homestead Army Air Base, Florida. Crewed primarily by contract civilian pilots, the mission of the squadron was ferrying aircraft along the South Atlantic Air Transport Route through the Caribbean to Brazil; then to Africa and then to combat airfields in Europe, Middle East, India or Australia. Redesignated as a training squadron in June 1943. Provided transition training in a wide variety of aircraft to experienced military and civilian pilots prior to them being assigned to ferrying duty. The squadron was disbanded at the end of March 1944 and its personnel and equipment were transferred to the 563d Army Air Forces Base Unit.

=== Cold War ===
The squadron was reactivated by Military Air Transport Service (MATS), June 1952 at Great Falls Air Force Base, Montana as the 75th Air Transport Squadron. Its primary mission was to transport personnel, equipment and supplies to Elmendorf Air Force Base, Alaska and return to Great Falls. When MATS ended operations at Great Falls, was transferred to Travis Air Force Base, California, continued Alaska support operations as well as flying airlift operations throughout the Pacific. It flew routine flights to Japan, Hawaii, Alaska and other points in Asia, including transport flights to Indochina and Karachi in Pakistan.

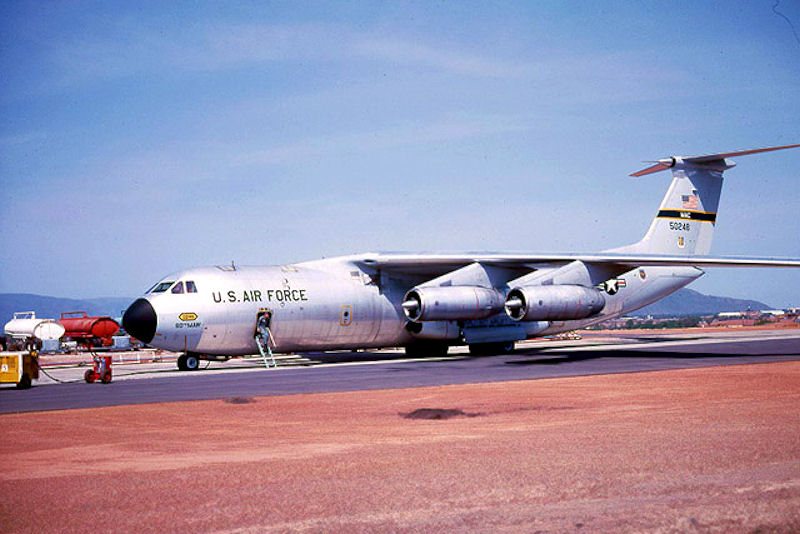
75th MAS C-141A Starlifter 65-0248, about 1966

It was the second squadron to receive Lockheed C-141A Starlifters in 1965. In 1966, the squadron was redesignated as the 75th Military Airlift Squadron. Along with the 44th Military Airlift Squadron, it primarily flew cargo and personnel to United States bases in South Vietnam and Thailand during the Vietnam War. In 1970 began transition to the larger Lockheed C-5A Galaxy airlifter, continuing its mission until the end of United States involvement in Vietnam in 1973. After Vietnam, the squadron returned to normal peacetime operations throughout the 1970s and early 1980s, supporting United States initiatives throughout the world by airlifting passengers, equipment and materiel wherever needed. The squadron briefly returned to combat duty in October 1983, when it supported combat operations in Grenada as part of Operation Urgent Fury and airlifted combat personnel to the island and assisted in the evacuation of American civilian medical students back to the United States. In December 1989, the squadron participated in Operation Just Cause, which ended the dictatorship of Panama's Gen. Manuel Noriega.

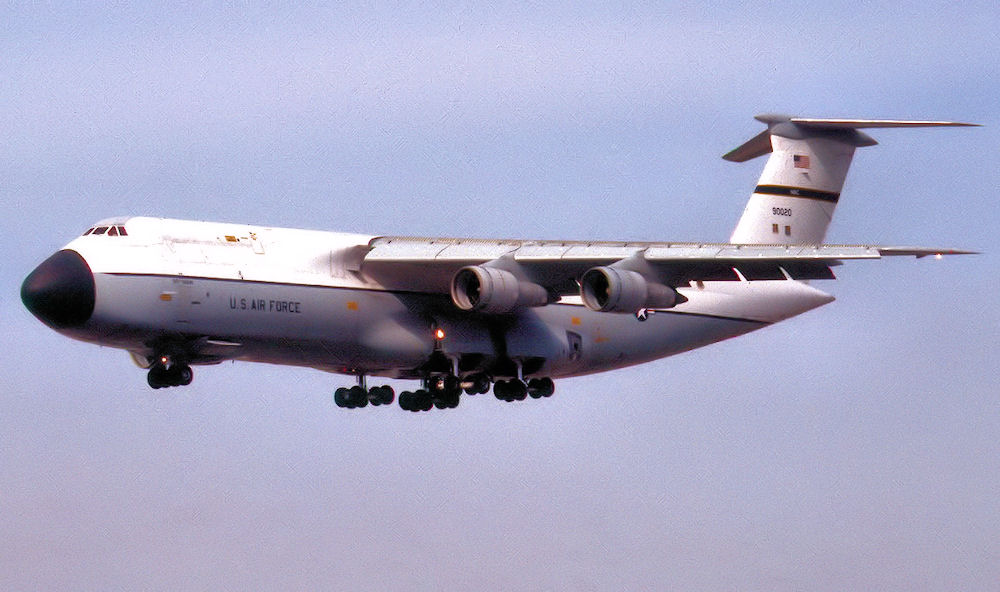
Squadron C-5A Galaxy about 1975 (Note: Aircraft is Lockheed C-5A Galaxy, serial 69-0020.)

In August 1990, the 75th provided strategic airlift in support of the coalition forces buildup in Southwest Asia prior to Operations Desert Shield; Operation Desert Storm and Operation Southern Watch. These operations helped contain the expansionist policies of Iraqi president Sadaam Hussein. In the wake of the 1991 Gulf War, the squadron also supported Operation Provide Comfort for Kurdish refugees for Kurdish refugees threatened by Iraqi forces. In November 1991, the squadron was redesignated the 75th Airlift Squadron.

=== Aeromedical airlift ===
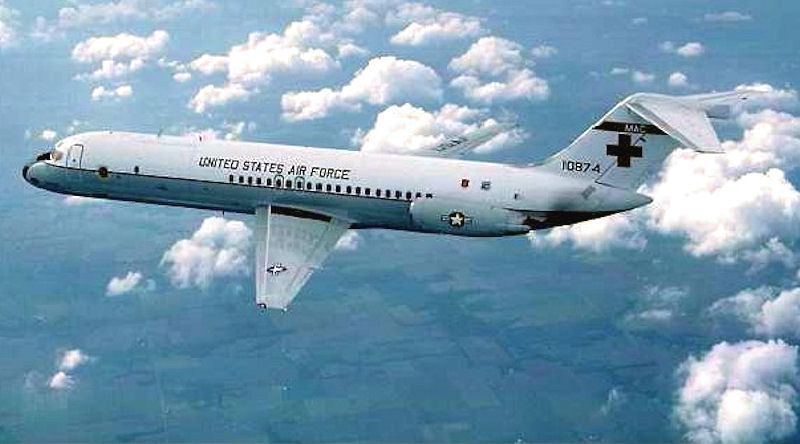
A squadron C-9 Nightingale in 2000

In 1993, the squadron transferred its C-5s to other units as part of a reorganization of airlift units and was reassigned to the United States Air Forces in Europe, being assigned Douglas C-9 Nightingale medical evacuation aircraft. It became the primary medical evacuation squadron in USAFE, transporting medical emergencies to Ramstein Air Base and subsequently to the Landstuhl Regional Medical Center. In 2003, squadron was inactivated.

=== Expeditionary operations ===
The squadron was converted to provisional status and redesignated the 75th Expeditionary Airlift Squadron. In May 2014 it was activated when crews and planes of the 317th Airlift Group deployed to Camp Lemonnier, Djibouti. The squadron supported Combined Joint Task Force – Horn of Africa. The unit mission included medical evacuations, disaster relief, humanitarian and airdrop operations. Operations included movement of the East Africa Response Force to forward positions.

== Lineage ==
- Constituted as the 75th Ferrying Squadron (Special) on 30 January 1943

Activated on 8 February 1943
Redesignated 75th Transport Transition Squadron on 4 June 1943
Disbanded on 31 March 1944

- Reconstituted and redesignated 75th Air Transport Squadron, Medium on 20 June 1952

Activated on 20 July 1952
Redesignated 75th Air Transport Squadron, Heavy on 8 October 1953
Redesignated 75th Military Airlift Squadron on 8 January 1966
Redesignated 75th Airlift Squadron on 1 November 1991
Inactivated on 30 September 2003

- Converted to provisional status and redesignated 75th Expeditionary Airlift Squadron on 4 December 2013

Activated on 28 May 2014

=== Assignments ===
- 2d Operational Training Unit, Air Transport Command, 8 February 1943 – 31 March 1944
- 1701st Air Transport Group, 20 July 1952
- 1501st Air Transport Group, 16 May 1953
- 1501st Air Transport Wing, 18 January 1963
- 60th Military Airlift Wing, 8 January 1966
- 60th Military Airlift Group, 6 March 1978
- 60th Military Airlift Wing, 15 February 1979
- 60th Operations Group, 1 November 1991
- 86th Operations Group, 1 October 1993 – 1 October 2003
- 449th Air Expeditionary Group, 28 May 2014 – present

=== Stations ===
- Homestead Army Air Base, Florida, 8 February 1943 – 31 March 1944
- Great Falls Air Force Base, Montana, 20 July 1952
- Travis Air Force Base, California, c. 28 April 1953 – 1 October 1993
- Ramstein Air Base, Germany, 1 October 1993 – 1 October 2003
- Camp Lemonnier, Djibouti, 28 May 2014 – present

=== Aircraft ===
- Curtiss C-46 Commando (1943–1944)
- Douglas C-54 Skymaster (1943–1944, 1952–1953)
- North American AT-6 Texan (1943)
- Cessna AT-17 Bobcat (1943)
- Consolidated B-24 Liberator (1943–1944)
- Lockheed C-36 Electra (1943)
- Douglas C-49 (1943)
- Lockheed C-57 Lodestar (1943)
- Lockheed C-60 Lodestar II (1943–1944)
- Cessna UC-78 Bobcat (1943)
- Consolidated C-87 Liberator Express (1943–1944)
- Boeing C-97 Stratofreighter (1953–1960)
- Douglas C-124 Globemaster II (1960–1965)
- Lockheed C-141 Starlifter (1965–1971)
- Lockheed C-5 Galaxy (1970–1993)
- Douglas C-9A Nightingale (1993–2003)
- Lockheed C-130 Hercules (2014–present)
