= 84th Military Airlift Squadron =

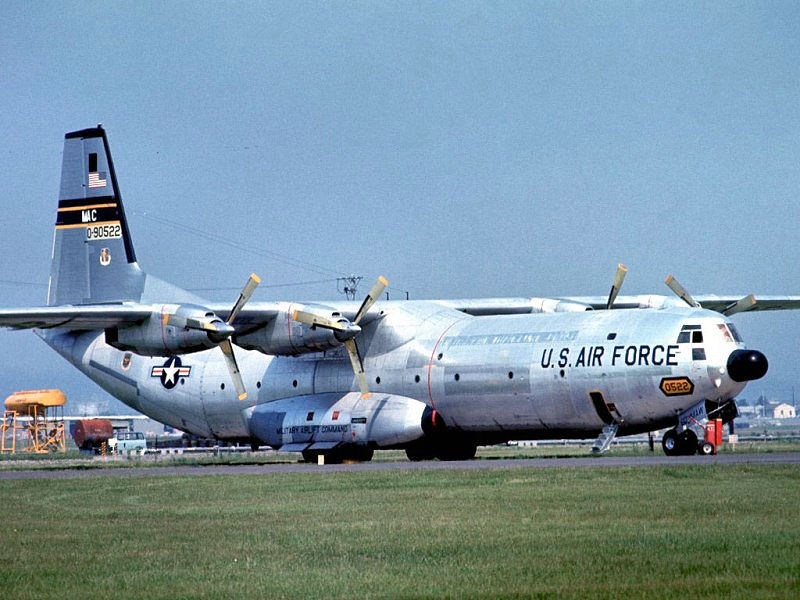
- Squadron C-133 Cargomaster about 1960 (Note: Aircraft is Douglas C-133B Cargomaster, serial 59-0522.)
- Active: 1943; 1952–1971
- Country: United States
- Branch: United States Air Force
- Role: Airlift
- Motto: Labores Sustenere (Latin for 'To Sustain Through Work')
- Decorations: Air Force Outstanding Unit Award (3x)

Insignia
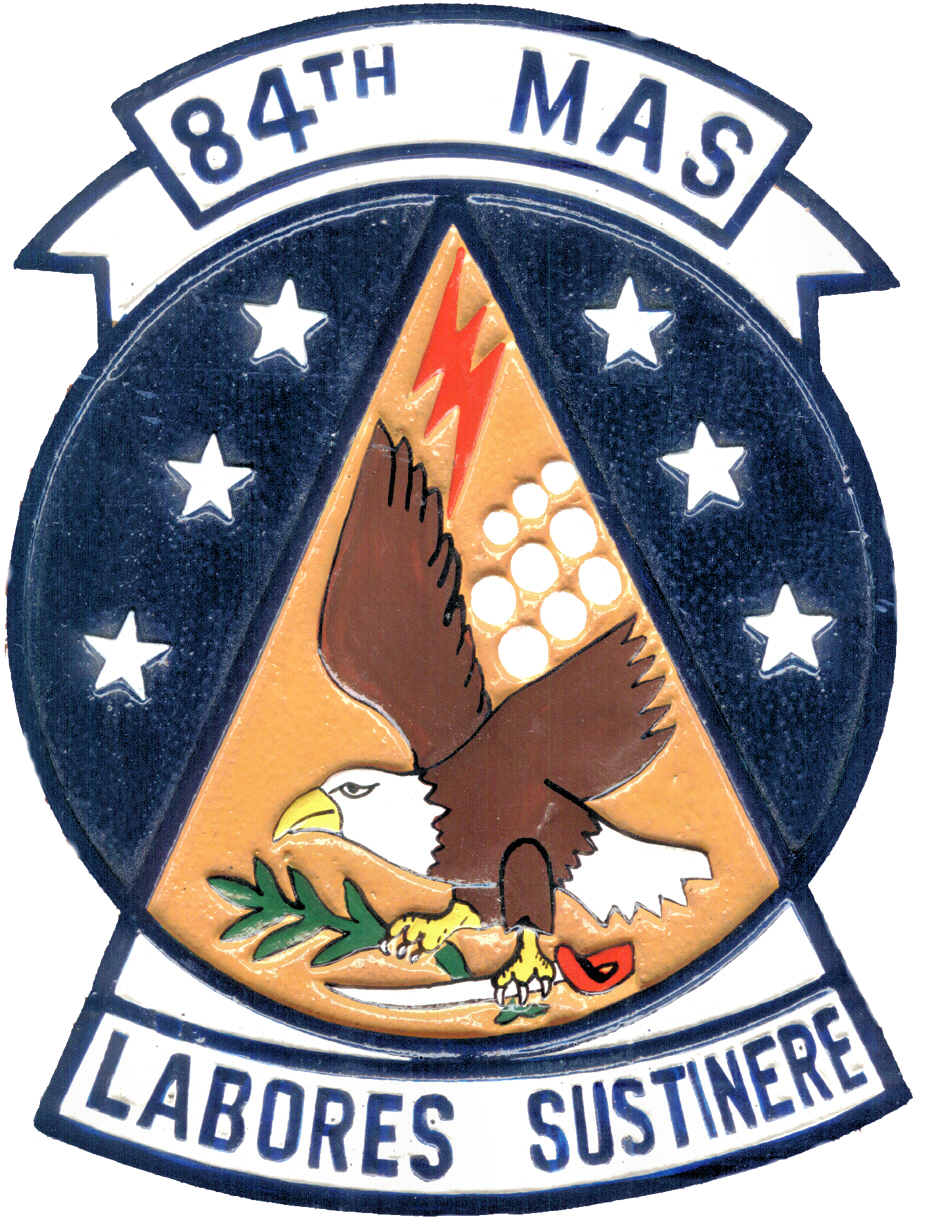
- 84th Military Airlift Squadron Emblem

The 84th Military Airlift Squadron is an inactive United States Air Force unit. Its last assignment was to the 60th Military Airlift Wing, Military Airlift Command, stationed at Travis Air Force Base, California, where it was inactivated on 1 July 1971.

== History ==
=== World War II ===
The squadron was activated under the Alaskan Wing, Air Transport Command in March 1943 at Edmonton Airport, Alberta, Canada; it provided support for transient lend-lease aircraft bound for the Soviet Union during 1943, as well as Eleventh Air Force aircraft which were to be used during the Aleutian Campaign.

=== Cold War ===
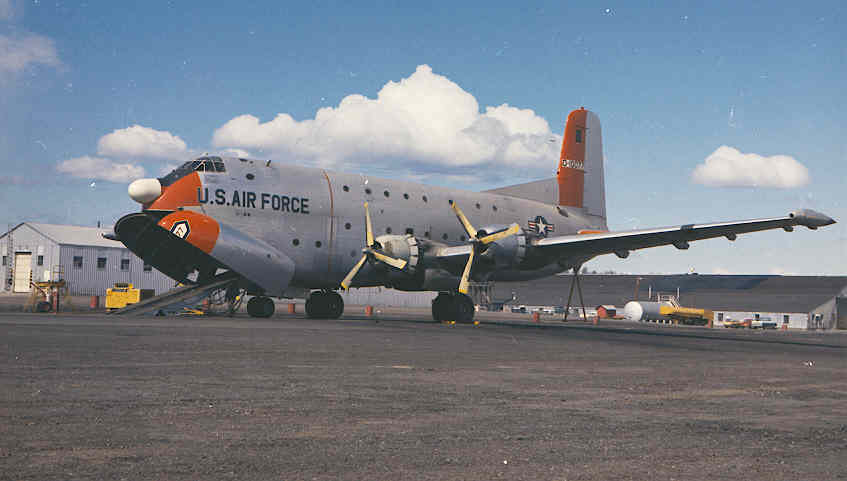
A C-124C Globemaster II; note the front-opening doors

The squadron was reactivated at Great Falls Air Force Base, Montana in 1952 under Military Air Transport Service (MATS). It operated Douglas C-54 Skymasters until MATS shut down operations at Great Falls. It moved to Travis Air Force Base in 1953, where it was equipped with long range Douglas C-124 Globemaster II intercontinental transports. The unit flew worldwide strategic transport missions under Western Transport Air Force. It was re-equipped with the Douglas C-133 Cargomaster strategic transport aircraft in 1958, and continued worldwide transport operations until July 1971 when the C-133s were retired.

== Lineage ==
- Established as the 84th Air Corps Ferrying Squadron and activated c. 1 March 1943

Redesignated 84th Transport Squadron on 26 March 1943
Disbanded on 20 September 1943
Reconstituted as the 84th Air Transport Squadron, Medium on 20 June 1952
Activated on 20 July 1952
Redesignated 84th Air Transport Squadron, on 16 May 1953
Redesignated 84th Military Airlift Squadron on 8 January 1966
Inactivated on 1 July 1971

=== Assignments ===
- 25rh Ferrying Group, c. 1 March – 20 September 1943
- 1701st Air Transport Wing, 20 July 1952
- 1501st Air Transport Wing, 16 May 1953
- 60th Military Airlift Wing, 8 January 1966 – 1 July 1971

=== Stations ===
- Edmonton Airport, Alberta, Canada, c. 1 March – 20 September 1943
- Great Falls Air Force Base, Montana, 20 July 1952
- Travis Air Force Base, California, 16 May 1953 – 1 July 1971

=== Aircraft ===
- Transient lend-lease aircraft on Alaska Transport Route, 1943
- Douglas C-54 Skymaster, 1952–1953
- Douglas C-124 Globemaster II, 1953–1958
- Douglas C-133 Cargomaster, 1957–1971
