= 60th Air Mobility Wing =

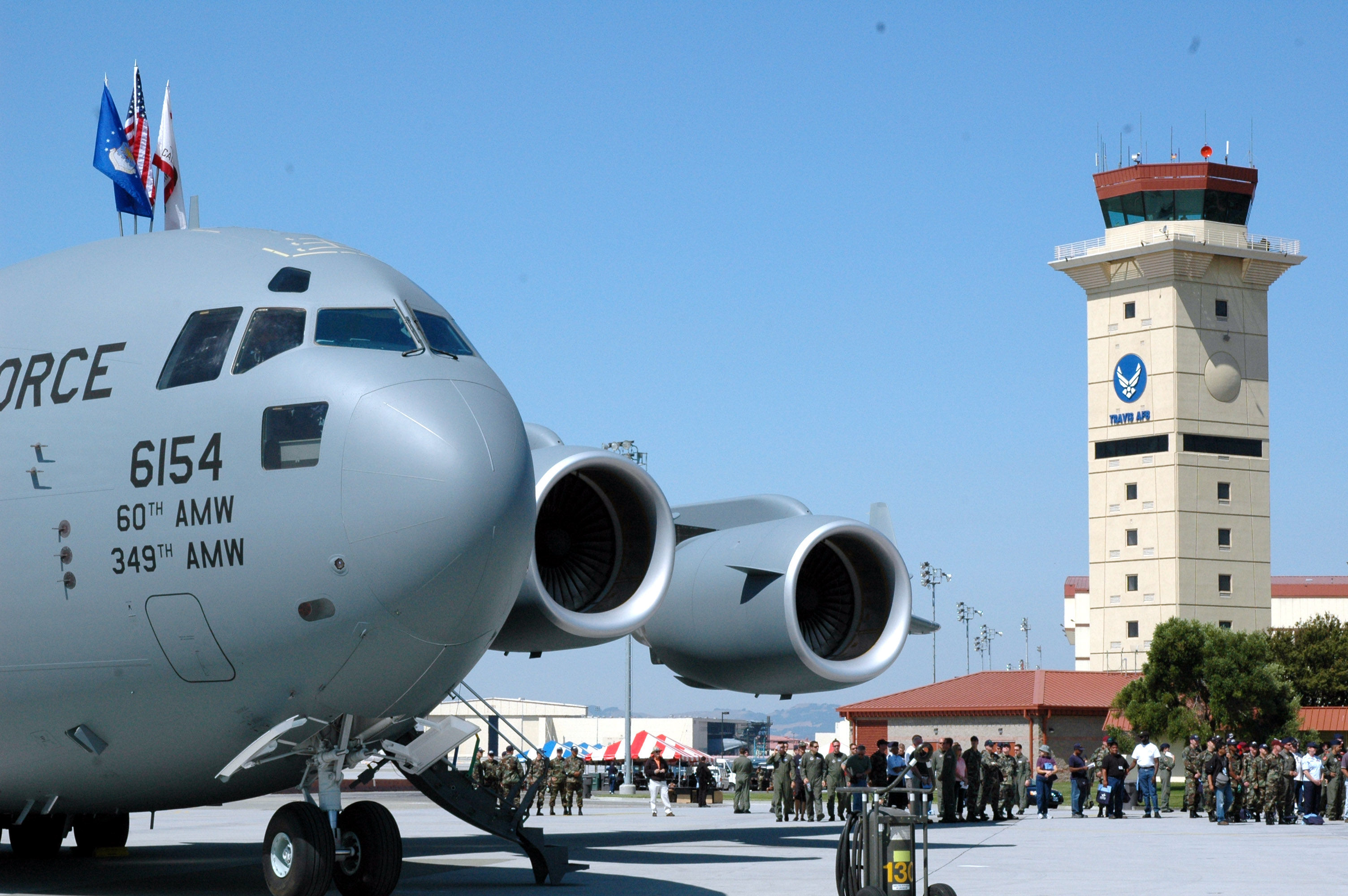
- Travis Air Force Base celebrates the arrival of its first Boeing C-17A Globemaster III 06-6154, the "Spirit of Solano."
- Active: 1 July 1948 – 25 September 1958; 8 January 1966 – present
- Country: United States
- Branch: United States Air Force
- Type: Airlift and aerial refueling
- Part of: Air Mobility Command
- Garrison/HQ: Travis Air Force Base
- Motto: Termini Non Existent (Latin for 'Boundaries do not Exist')
- Mascot: Golden Bear
- Engagements: Berlin Airlift Kosovo Campaign Armed Forces Expeditionary: Operation Urgent Fury; Operation Just Cause

- Decorations: Air Force Meritorious Unit Award Air Force Outstanding Unit Award (20x)

Commanders
- Current commander: Colonel Brandon R. Shroyer
- Vice Commander: Colonel Nelson J. Prouty
- Command Chief: Chief Master Sergeant Laura E. Hoover
- Notable commanders: William J. Begert; James A. Hill

Insignia
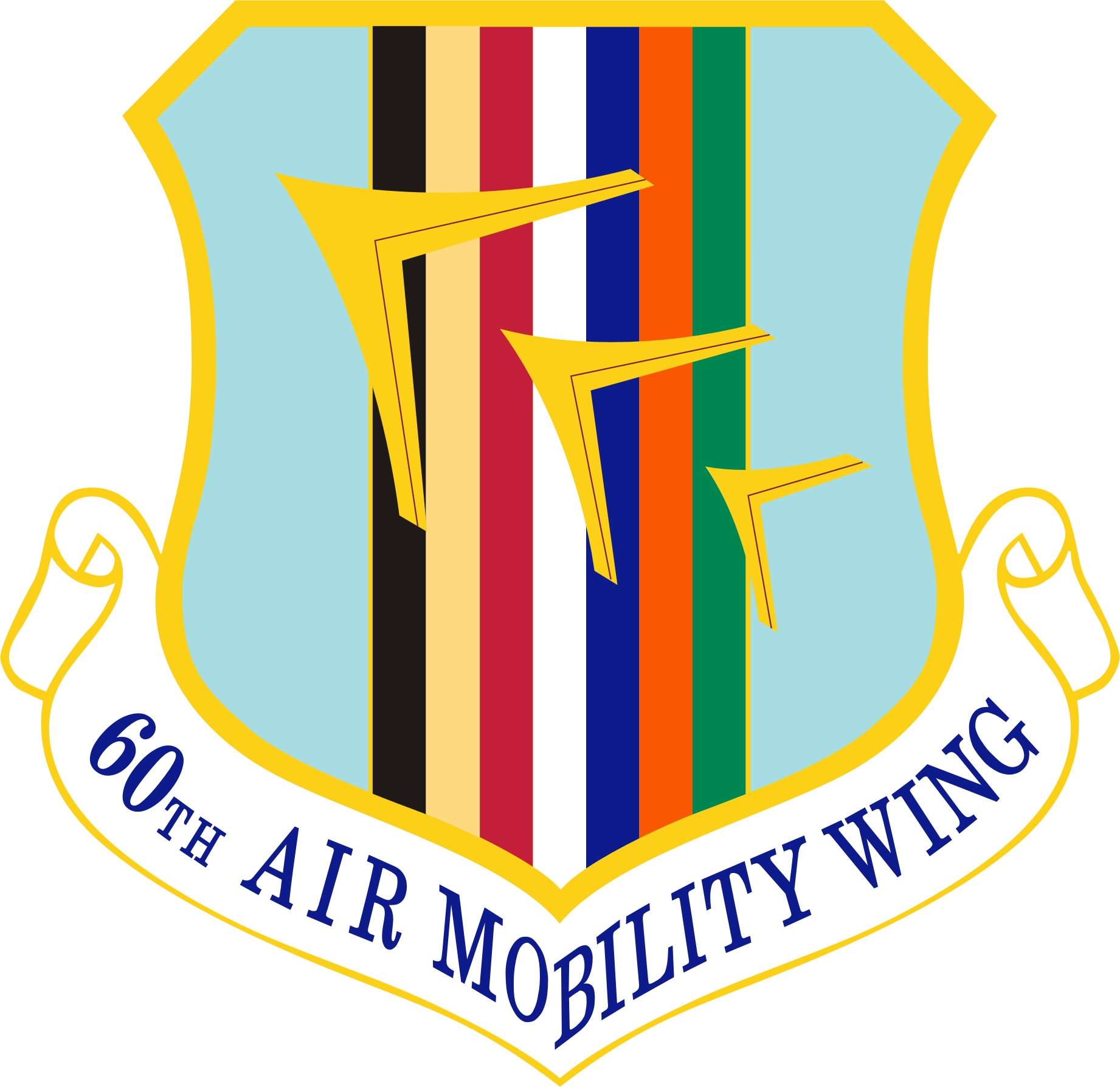
- 60th Air Mobility Wing emblem

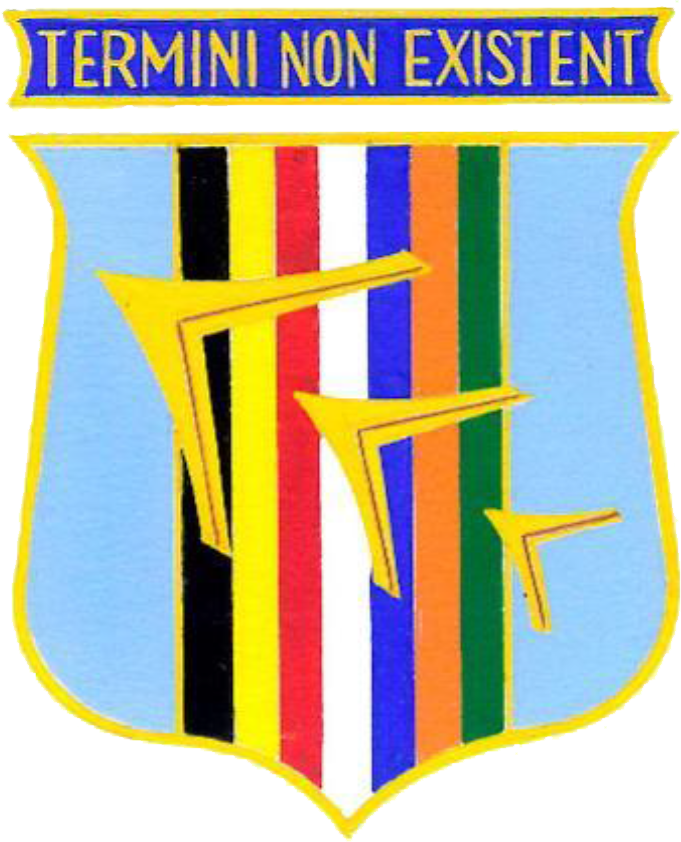
- Original form of the 60th Troop Carrier Wing emblem (Note: Approved 7 September 1955.)

Aircraft flown
- Transport: C-5M Super Galaxy; C-17 Globemaster III
- Tanker: KC-10 Extender

The 60th Air Mobility Wing is the largest air mobility organization in the United States Air Force and is responsible for strategic airlift and air refueling missions around the world. It is the host unit at Travis Air Force Base in California. Wing activity is primarily focused on support in the Middle East region; however, it also maintains operations in areas of the Pacific and Indian Oceans.

== Units ==
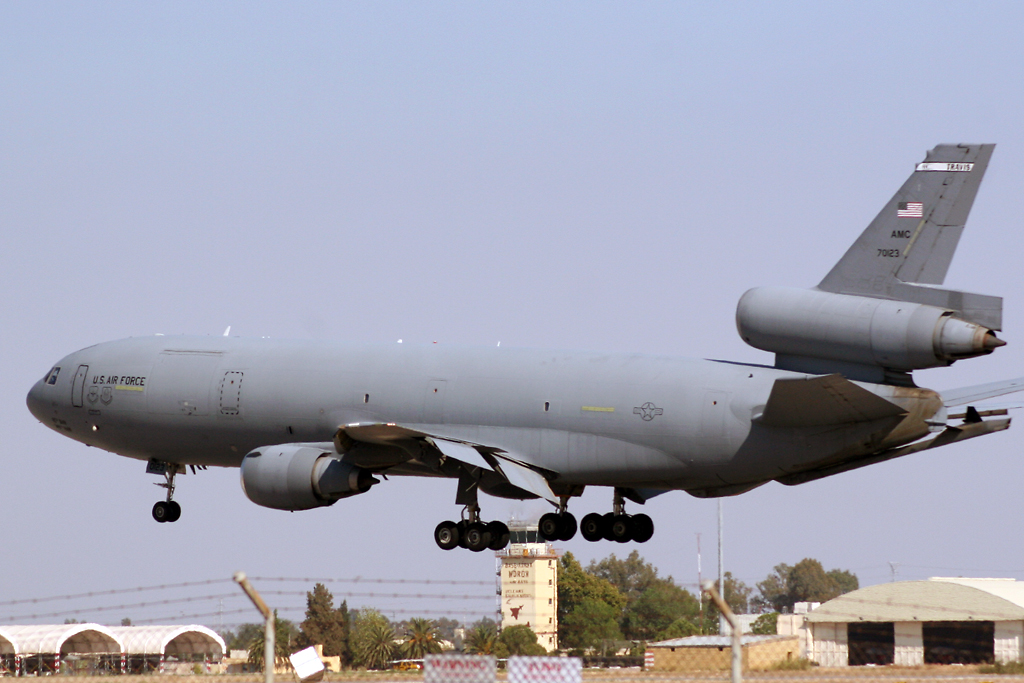
McDonnell Douglas KC-10A Extender 87-1023 landing at Morón AFB

- 60th Operations Group (60 OG)

6th Air Refueling Squadron (6 ARS) KC-46 Pegasus
9th Air Refueling Squadron (9 ARS) KC-46 Pegasus
21st Airlift Squadron (21 AS) C-17A
22d Airlift Squadron (22 AS) C-5M
60th Aeromedical Evacuation Squadron
60th Operations Support Squadron

- 60th Maintenance Group (60 MXG)
- 60th Mission Support Group (60 MSG)
- 60th Medical Group (60 MDG)

Additionally, the 60th Comptroller Squadron (60 CPTS) reports directly to the wing staff.

== History ==
=== United States Air Forces in Europe ===
The 60th Air Mobility Wing traces its origins to the establishment of the 60th Troop Carrier Wing on 1 July 1948 at Kaufbeuren Air Base, Occupied Germany. The wing was established in accordance with the Hobson Plan organizational structure established by the United States Air Force in 1948. Assigned to the new wing was the 60th Troop Carrier Group, which served as its operational component. The 60th Group was assigned three flying squadrons: the 10th, 11th, and 12th Troop Carrier Squadrons, which were assigned C-54 Skymaster transports. Support units of the 60th Wing in 1948 were the 60th Airdrome Group; the 60th Maintenance & Supply Group and the 60th Medical Group.

The 60th Troop Carrier Group, however, was detached, supporting the Berlin Airlift from other bases. The wing operated under control of the provisional airlift task force from 29 July 1948 but was not directly involved in airlift operations until it moved to RAF Fassberg, Germany in January 1949. From 20 to 26 January September 1949, the group flew Berlin airlift missions. Its C-54s primarily carried coal into West Berlin. On 29 January 1949, the wing's headquarters element moved to RAF Fassberg and fell under operational control of the 1st Airlift Task Force. There, the 60th gained operational control of the 313th Troop Carrier Group, the 513th Air Base Group, the 513th Maintenance and Supply Group, and the 513th Medical Group.

When the Berlin Airlift ended on 26 September 1949, the 60th began moving without its personnel and equipment to Wiesbaden Air Base, West Germany, where it assumed the resources of the inactivated 7150th Air Force Composite Wing. The 60th Troop Carrier Wing became operational at Wiesbaden on 1 October 1949, and United States Air Forces Europe re-designated the wing again as the 60 TCW (Medium) on 16 November 1949. On 21 January 1951, Twelfth Air Force became the 60th's new higher headquarters.

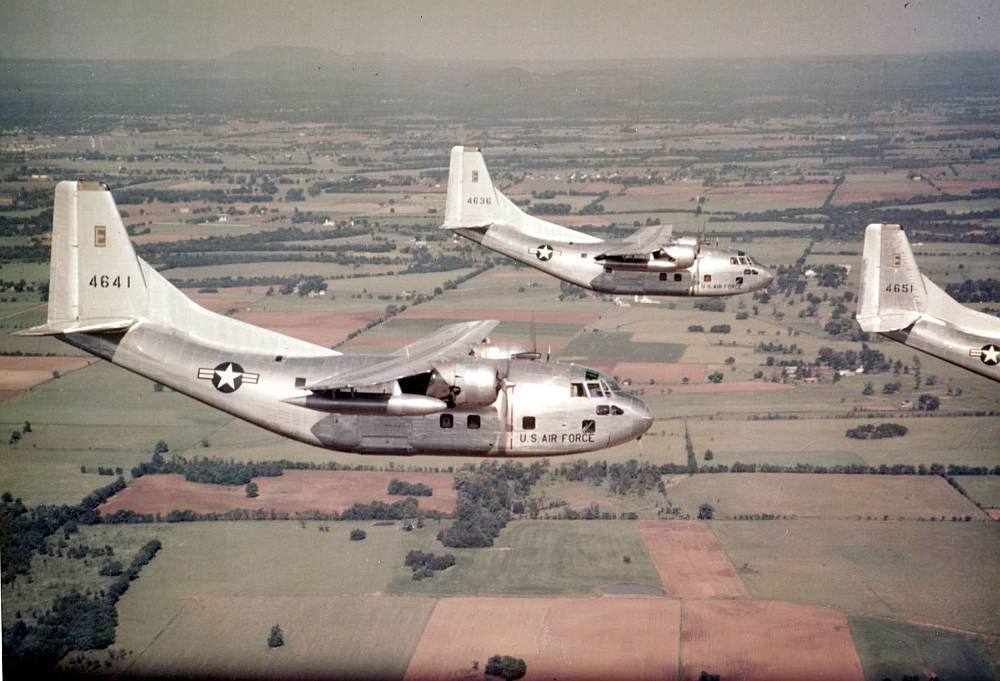
376th Troop Carrier Squadron, C-123B Providers, Dreux-Louvilliers Air Base, France, 1957

At this time, the wing had no tactical mission. On 2 June 1951, the wing replaced the 61st Troop Carrier Wing at Rhein-Main Air Base, where the 60th had been stationed on detached service. At this time, the 60th TCW resumed a tactical role and assumed responsibility for controlling all US tactical airlift resources in Europe. The 60th TCW provided logistic airlift services to US and Allied forces in Europe while maintaining host unit responsibilities at Rhein-Main. Operating the C-82 Packet, C-119 Flying Boxcar, and C-47 Skytrain aircraft, the wing participated in countless exercises and provided air transportability training to US Army units.

On 1 August 1955 the wing was assigned to the 322d Air Division and moved to Dreux Air Base, France. Later that month, the 62d Troop Carrier Squadron, a Tactical Air Command rotational unit from Sewart Air Force Base, Tennessee, arrived and entered attached status with the 60th. From 22 March to 2 June 1956, the 309th Troop Carrier Group, Assault (Fixed Wing), from Ardmore Air Force Base, Oklahoma deployed to Dreux. Initially, attached to the 60th for logistical support and operational control, the 309th was officially assigned to the wing on 8 August 1956. The 309th introduced the C-123 Provider to the European theater.

In a major reorganization, the 322nd reduced the headquarters elements of the 60th, 309th, and the 60th Mission and Support Group to one officer and one airman each on 15 November 1956. In conjunction with this, the 60th's chief of operations gained control of the flying squadrons. All three groups inactivated on 12 March 1957. In mid-1958, the 376th, 377th, and 378th Troop Carrier Squadrons, formerly assigned to the 309th, transitioned from the C-123 to the C-119 aircraft. Then on 25 September 1958, the 60th Troop Carrier Wing was inactivated, ending its first period of service. With the exception of the 10th, 11th, and 12th Troop Carrier Squadrons (which now reported directly to the 322d Air Division) all other units that were assigned to the 60th were also inactivated.

=== Military Airlift Command ===
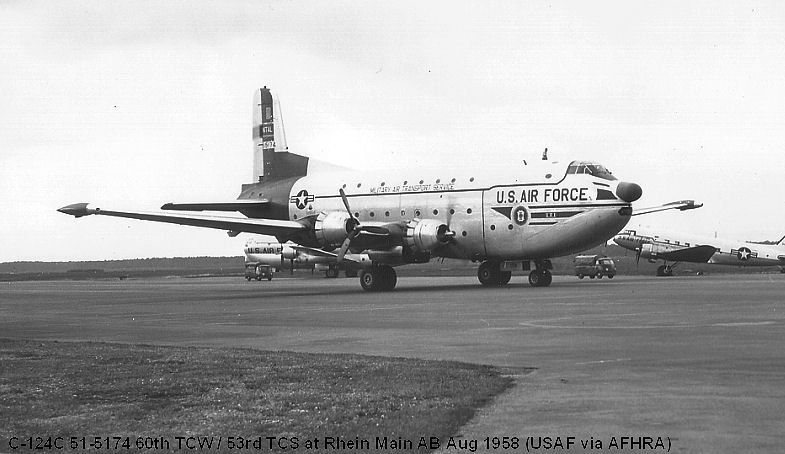
Douglas C-124A Globemaster II, AF Ser. No. 51-5174 of the 60th Troop Carrier Wing, August 1966. This aircraft was sent to AMARC in November 1969

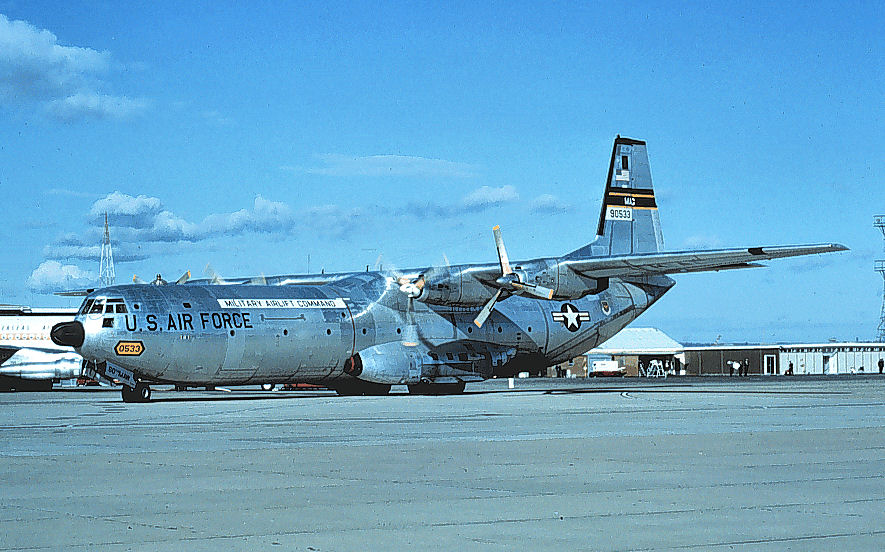
Douglas C-133B-DL Cargomaster, AF Ser. No. 59-0533, 60th MAW, 1967. This aircraft was sent to AMARC in 1971. It was sold to a private owner and placed on civil registry as N77152, later sold to Cargomaster Corp of Anchorage, Alaska as N133B. Scrapped at Anchorage IAP April–July 2000.

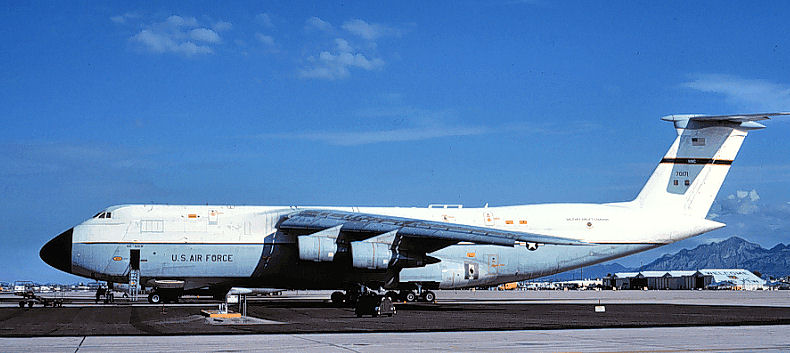
Lockheed C-5A Galaxy, AF Ser. No. 68-0010, of the 60th Military Airlift Wing in 1970s livery.

The 60th Military Airlift Wing was reactivated on 27 December 1965 and replaced the Military Air Transport Service (MATS) 1501st Air Transport Wing, Heavy, as the "host-wing" at Travis Air Force Base, California, on 8 January 1966. This was as a result of the discontinuation of MATS MAJCON and their replacement by United States Air Force (AFCON) units of the new Military Airlift Command (MAC), which replaced MATS as the primary USAF strategic airlift command. The newly-activated 22d Air Force (successor to the Western Transport Air Force of MATS) at Travis became the new parent organization for the 60th.

Flying the C-124 Globemaster IIs, the C-130 Hercules, the C-141A Starlifter, and the C-133 Cargomaster, the 60th entered service while the US was beginning a major buildup of its military forces in Southeast Asia. The 60th quickly established a strategic aerial pipeline to the region, whose support of US forces in South Vietnam earned the unit three Air Force Outstanding Unit Awards. In 1966, the wing became the first recipient of the Air Force Logistic Systems Award. Assigned to the wing on 8 January 1966, the C-141-equipped 75th Military Airlift Squadron transitioned to the C-5 Galaxy, becoming the Military Air Command's first operational squadron to fly the new transport aircraft. On 6 February 1972, the wing added a second C-5 squadron, when the 22nd Military Airlift Squadron activated at Travis.

In the spring of 1973, the 60th Military Airlift Wing became a major participant in Operation Homecoming, the repatriation of American prisoners of war from North Vietnam. As the C-141s arrived with the former POWs, the David Grant Medical Center at Travis became a major processing facility for the returnees. HOMECOMING marked the official termination of US involvement in the Vietnam War.

During the fall of 1973, the 60th supported Operation Nickel Grass, the support of Israel during the Yom Kippur War in the Middle East. As the Military Air Command's prime representative in this operation, the 60th flew 36 C-5 and C-141 missions and delivered over 22,000 tons of supplies and equipment.

With the Communist takeover of Cambodia and South Vietnam imminent, MAC diverted a C-5, flown by the 22nd Military Airlift Squadron, from Clark Air Base in the Philippines to Tan Son Nhut Air Base near Saigon to fly the first Operation Babylift mission. Both Operation Babylift and Operation New Life missions transported thousands of refugees to the United States during April–May 1975. By the end of Operation Babylift, MAC carriers airlifted 1,794 Southeast Asian orphans to their new American families. Military Air Command C-141s carried 949 of those babies.

In October 1974, the 60th began supporting Operation Deep Freeze missions, the annual resupply of scientific research teams in the Antarctic. Flying from Christchurch, New Zealand, the wing had logged a near perfect record for reliability. On 4 October 1989, a 60th Military Airlift Wing C-5 became the first "Galaxy" to land on the Antarctic continent. For airlift achievements during the 1970s, the wing earned two more Air Force Outstanding Unit Awards (AFOUA).

To upgrade cargo carrying capacity, MAC initiated a major upgrade program for its C-141A fleet beginning in 1979. The project added an in-flight refueling system and 23 feet in length to the fuselage. The stretched "Starlifter" was designated the C-141B. The 60th sent its first C-141A to the Lockheed-Georgia Company on 13 August 1979. The wing received its last "B" model on 10 May 1982.

A highly visible instrument of US foreign policy, the 60th played an important role in maintaining the balance of power in the world during the 1980s. Supporting US naval forces in the Indian Ocean and Gulf of Arabia, the wing flew frequent missions to Diego Garcia and other installations in the region. When underwater mines, suspected to have been placed by Iran, threatened the Red Sea shipping lanes in 1984, the 60th airlifted minesweeping helicopters from Naval Air Station Norfolk, VA, to Rota, Spain, where the Navy assembled and carried them into action via surface vessel. In 1987, a similar situation in the Persian Gulf resulted in the deployment of the same helicopter minesweepers.

Throughout the 1980s, the wing supported several troop deployments to Central America, the deployments being U.S. responses to Soviet-backed governments with Central America. Operation Urgent Fury in 1983 took the Caribbean island-nation of Grenada out of the hands of Soviet-backed Cubans. Operation Golden Pheasant in 1988 projected US strength to counter Nicaraguan incursions into Honduras; Operation Nimrod Dancer in May 1989 showed US opposition to Panamanian dictator Manuel Noriega; and Operation Just Cause in December 1989 and January 1990 toppled Noriega from power and led to his arrest and trial in the US. For its participation in Just Cause, the 60th earned another AFOUA.

Members of the 60th have participated in countless humanitarian airlift missions over the years. When earthquakes devastated Mexico City in 1985, a 60th Military Airlift Wing C-5 was one of MAC's first aircraft to deliver relief equipment. In December 1988 and early 1989, personnel assigned to the 60th Aerial Port Squadron helped load Soviet IL-62 aircraft with medical supplies and relief equipment for shipment to earthquake victims in Armenia. In 1989, the wing carried relief supplies to Charleston, South Carolina and the United States Virgin Islands to assist victims of Hurricane Hugo. Later that year, crews also flew relief equipment and personnel to San Francisco's south bay area to assist victims of the 1989 Loma Prieta earthquake. The 60th played a key role in Operation FIERY VIGIL. During June and July 1991, repeated eruptions of Mount Pinatubo in the Philippines, buried Clark Air Base with tons of volcanic ash, thus forcing an emergency evacuation of US military dependents and non-essential military personnel.

=== After the Cold War ===
David Grant USAF Medical Center, Travis AFB, CA (official USAF photo)

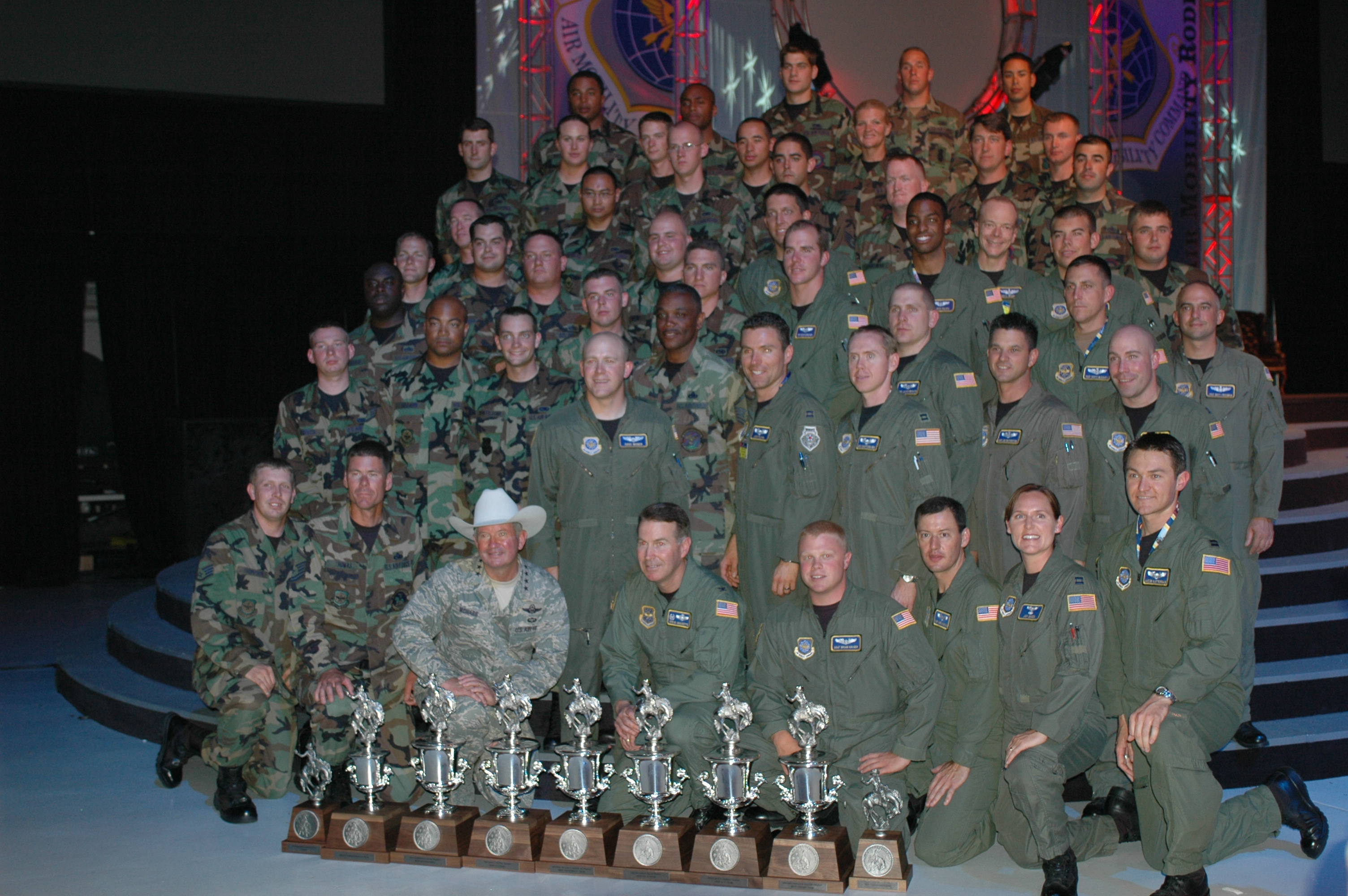
The 60 AMW team celebrating their win with General Duncan McNabb

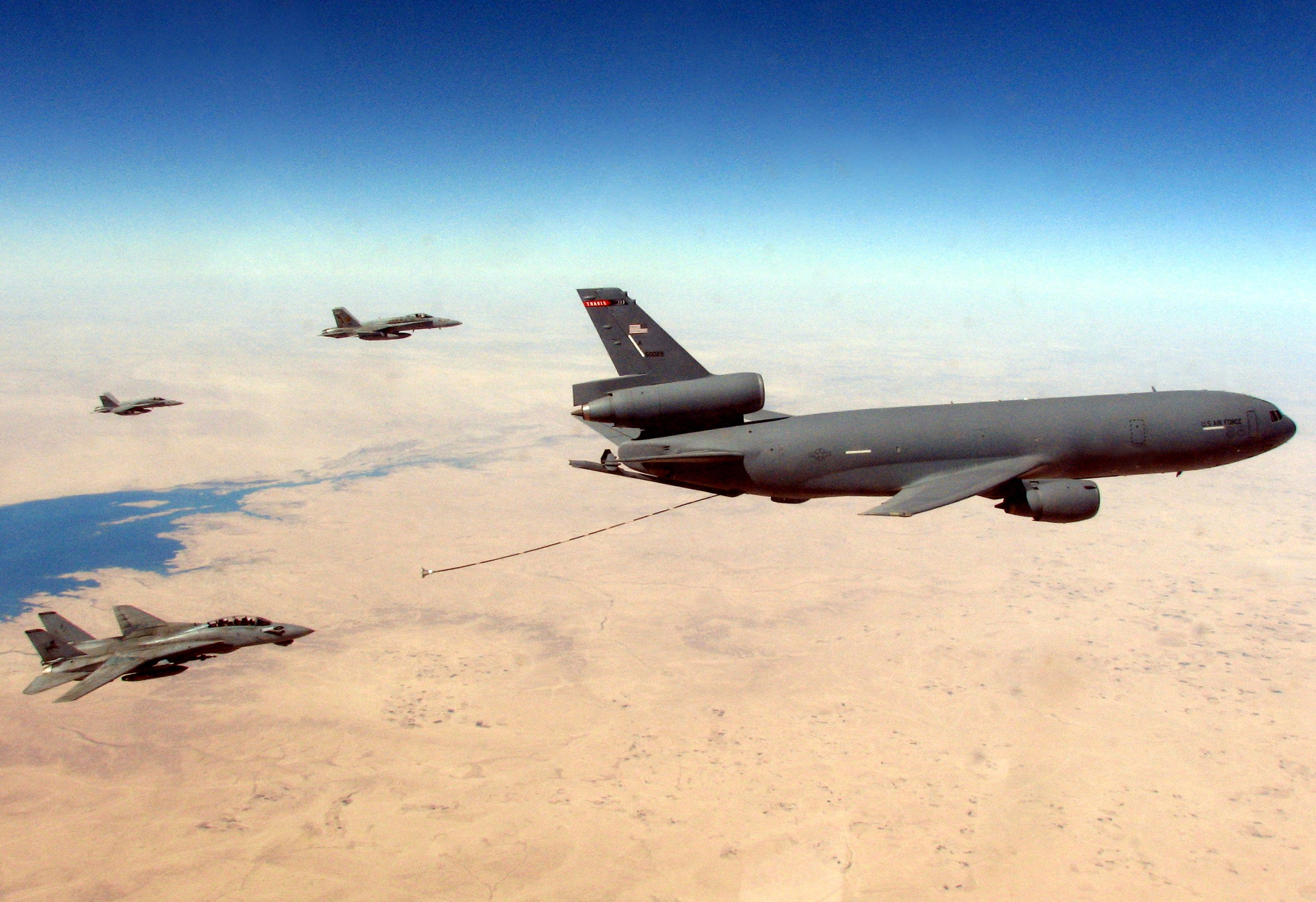
A F-14D and F/A-18Cs prepare to refuel from a KC-10 Extender, assigned to the 60th Air Mobility Wing, during a mission over the Persian Gulf region

Driven by the end of the Cold War, economic factors and a smaller perceived threat to its security, the Department of Defense was significantly reduced and reorganized, beginning in 1989. During 1991 and 1992, the Air Force underwent the most massive restructuring since its establishment as a separate service in 1947. With the restructuring, MAC became the Air Mobility Command (AMC) and absorbed Strategic Air Command's tanker airlift resources. As the "objective" wing became the hallmark of the new Air Force, AMC re-designated the wing as the 60th Airlift Wing on 1 November 1991.

On 2 August 1990, the armies of Iraqi dictator Saddam Hussein invaded the neighboring tiny, oil-rich nation of Kuwait. Responding to a request for assistance from King Fahd Ibn Abdul Aziz of Saudi Arabia, U.S. President George Bush ordered troops to the region as part of Operation Desert Shield. A coalition of 27 allied nations supported the efforts with troops, money, medical teams, supplies, and equipment. Operation DESERT STORM, the coalition invasion to remove Iraqi troops from Kuwait, began on 17 January 1991. The 60th played a vital role throughout the course of Operation Desert Shield/Desert Storm, by flying 1,280 C-5 and 954 C-141 missions from Travis Air Force Base. The airlift portion of the operation was nicknamed Operation Volant Wind.

Relief efforts kept the 60th busy. Beginning in August 1990, the wing provided airlift and logistic support to US and coalition forces in Southwest Asia, while continuing to perform worldwide airlift operations, including humanitarian missions to nations to Latin America and the former Soviet Union. In 1992–1993, commenced airlift in support of U.S. relief operations in Somalia during Operation Provide Relief and Operation Restore Hope. It continued to support on-going operations in Southwest Asia during Operation Southern Watch. The wing's elements also supported Operation Provide Comfort for Kurdish refugees, supported the evacuation of military personnel and their dependents from the Philippines through Operation Fiery Vigil in 1991, and provided airlift support to Balkans peacekeeping missions beginning in 1995 with Operation Joint Endeavor, and continuing under Operation Joint Guard and Operation Joint Forge. It deployed tanker and support elements to the European theater during Operation Allied Force from March–June 1999, as well as providing airlift support to other air expeditionary forces deploying to the operation.

After 11 September 2001 terrorist attacks on the World Trade Center and the Pentagon, the 60th began airlift and refueling operations in support of Operation Noble Eagle and Operation Enduring Freedom. In March 2003, the United States as part of the global war on terrorism, initiated Operation Iraqi Freedom.

One 8 August 2006, the 60th received its first C-17 Globemaster III aircraft "The Spirit of Solano". The next day, that aircraft was made operational and flew its first mission. The wing won top honors as the best Air Mobility Wing during the 2007 Air Mobility Rodeo. On 5 November 2008, the 60th received its 13th and final C-17 aircraft, "The Spirit of Travis." Fifteen members of the Travis family were on hand to witness the aircraft's arrival.

From February to August 2008, the 21st Airlift Squadron with C-17A Globemaster IIIs deployed as a squadron in support of Operation Enduring Freedom and Iraqi Freedom. Their involvement in the operations garnered the squadron an Air Force Outstanding Unit Award with Valor. The 60th Air Mobility Wing continued to answer the call to action whenever it is needed.

From January–February 2010, the 60th Air Mobility Wing’s C-17s of the 21st Airlift Squadron spearheaded the U.S. humanitarian response to the massive Haitian earthquake during Operation Unified Response. In addition, the 60th Medical Group deployed and operated the largest land-based emergency hospital in Haiti in the weeks immediately after the earthquake.

In March 2011, the 60th Air Mobility Wing supported three simultaneous new operations, while continuing to support combat operations in Iraq and Afghanistan. The first of these operations, Operation Tomodachi, responded to the tsunami in northeastern Japan and the resulting damage at the Fukushima Daiichi nuclear power plant by delivering relief supplies, rescue teams, and nuclear experts. In the second operation, Operation Pacific Passage, the wing and its Travis AFB partners received over 2600 military volunteer evacuees and their pets from U.S. bases in Japan threatened by radiation leaking from the damaged nuclear power plant. In the third operation, Operation Odyssey Dawn, the 60th Air Mobility Wing provided support to the NATO operation to protect anti-Gaddafi rebels during the Libyan Civil War.

From late-October–November 2012, the 60th Air Mobility Wing rapidly responded to the President’s call to assist the Federal Emergency Management Agency in restoring utilities in areas of the northeastern U.S. devastated by Superstorm Sandy. Utility repair crews and their equipment from throughout the western U.S. found their way to the northeast aboard Travis C-5s and C-17s.

=== Lineage ===
- Established as the 60th Troop Carrier Wing, Medium and activated, on 1 July 1948

Redesignated: 60th Troop Carrier Wing, Heavy, on 5 November 1948
Redesignated: 60th Troop Carrier Wing, Medium on 16 November 1949
Inactivated on 25 September 1958
Redesignated 60th Military Airlift Wing and activated on 27 December 1965 (not organized)
Organized on 8 January 1966
Redesignated: 60th Airlift Wing on 1 November 1991
Redesignated: 60th Air Mobility Wing on 1 October 1994

=== Assignments ===
- United States Air Forces in Europe, 1 July 1948

Attached to Airlift Task Force [Provisional], 29 July – 3 November 1948
Attached to 1 Air Lift Task Force, 4 November 1948 – 19 January 1949

- 1 Air Lift Task Force, 20 January 1949
- United States Air Forces in Europe, 26 September 1949
- Twelfth Air Force, 21 January 1951

Attached to 322d Air Division [Combat Cargo], 1 April 1954 – 31 July 1955

- 322d Air Division (Combat Cargo), 1 August 1955 – 25 September 1958
- Military Air Transport Service, 27 December 1965 (not organized)
- Twenty-Second Air Force, 8 January 1966
- Military Airlift, Travis, 15 February 1979
- Twenty-Second Air Force, 21 July 1980
- Fifteenth Air Force, 1 July 1993
- Eighteenth Air Force, since 1 October 2003

=== Components ===
Groups

- 60th Troop Carrier (later, 60th Military Airlift; 60th Operations) Group: 1 July 1948 – 12 March 1957 (detached 1 July 1948 – 1 June 1951); 6 March 1978 – 15 February 1979; since 1 November 1991
- 309th Troop Carrier Group: attached 22 March – 7 August 1956, assigned 8 August 1956 – 12 March 1957
- 313th Troop Carrier Group: attached 20 January – 18 September 1949

Squadrons

United States Air Forces in Europe

- 10th Troop Carrier Squadron: attached 15 November 1956 – 11 March 1957, assigned 12 March 1957 – 25 September 1958
- 11th Troop Carrier Squadron: attached 18–26 September 1949; attached 15 November 1956 – 11 March 1957, assigned 12 March 1957 – 25 September 1958
- 12th Troop Carrier Squadron: attached 15 November 1956 – 11 March 1957, assigned 12 March 1957 – 25 September 1958
- 376th Troop Carrier Squadron: attached 15 November 1956 – 11 March 1957, assigned 12 March 1957 – 25 September 1958
- 377th Troop Carrier Squadron: attached 15 November 1956 – 11 March 1957, assigned 12 March 1957 – 25 September 1958
- 378th Troop Carrier Squadron: attached 15 November 1956 – 11 March 1957, assigned 12 March 1957 – 25 September 1958
- 776th Troop Carrier Squadron: attached 28 October 1954 – 1 May 1955
- 778th Troop Carrier Squadron: attached 28 April – c. 1 November 1955
- 7206 Air Transport Squadron: attached – 1 March November 1957.

Military Airlift Command

- 7th Military Airlift Squadron: 13 March 1971 – 6 March 1978; 15 February 1979 – 1 November 1991
- 22d Military Airlift Squadron: 8 February 1972 – 6 March 1978; 15 February 1979 – 1 November 1991
- 28th Military Airlift Squadron: 8 January 1966 – 8 July 1967 (detached 1–8 July 1967)
- 44th Military Airlift Squadron: 8 January 1966 – 1 March 1972
- 75th Military Airlift Squadron: 8 January 1966 – 6 March 1978; 15 February 1979 – 1 November 1991
- 84th Military Airlift Squadron: 8 January 1966 – 1 July 1971
- 85th Military Airlift Squadron: 8 January 1966 – 8 July 1967
- 86th Military Airlift Squadron: 8 January 1966 – 6 March 1978; 15 February 1979 – 1 November 1991

Air Mobility Command

- 19th Airlift Squadron: 1 November 1993 – 31 December 1996
- 20th Airlift Squadron: 1 November 1993 – 31 December 1998

=== Stations ===
- Kaufbeuren Air Base, Germany, 1 July 1948
- RAF Fassberg, Germany, 20 January 1949
- Wiesbaden Air Base, Germany later West Germany, 1 October 1949
- Rhein-Main Air Base, West Germany, 2 June 1951
- Dreux Air Base, France, 15 October 1955 – 25 September 1958
- Travis Air Force Base, California, since 8 January 1966

=== Aircraft ===
- Primarily C-54, 1949; C-47, 1949; C-82, 1951–1953; C-119, 1951, 1953–1958; and C-123, 1956–1958
- Also operated, in fewer numbers, C-45, 1948; C-74, 1948; B-17, 1949–1951; B-26, 1949–1951; C-47, 1949–1951, 1951–1955; C-54, 1949–1951, 1951–1952; C-82, 1949–1951; L-5, 1949–1951; L-20, 1955
- Primarily C-124, 1966–1967; C-130, 1966; C-133, 1966–1971; C-141, 1966–1997; C-5, 1970–; C-17, 2006–; and KC-10, from 1994 until 2024
- Also operated, in fewer numbers, VC/C-54, 1966–1969; VT/T-29, 1966–1973; U-3, 1966–1968; C-47, 1968–1969; C-131, 1969–1975; T-39, 1969–1975

== Unit shields ==
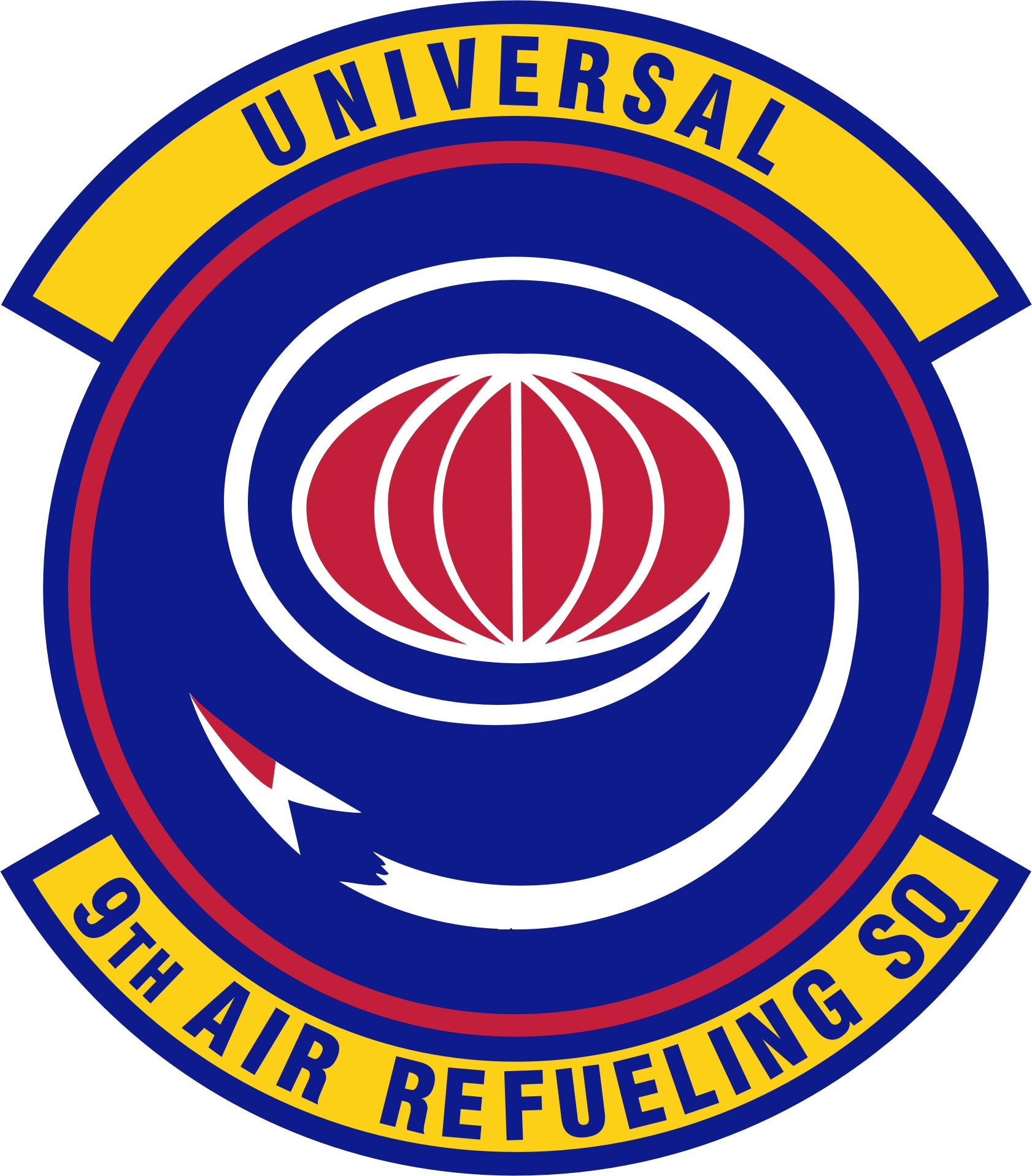
9 ARS

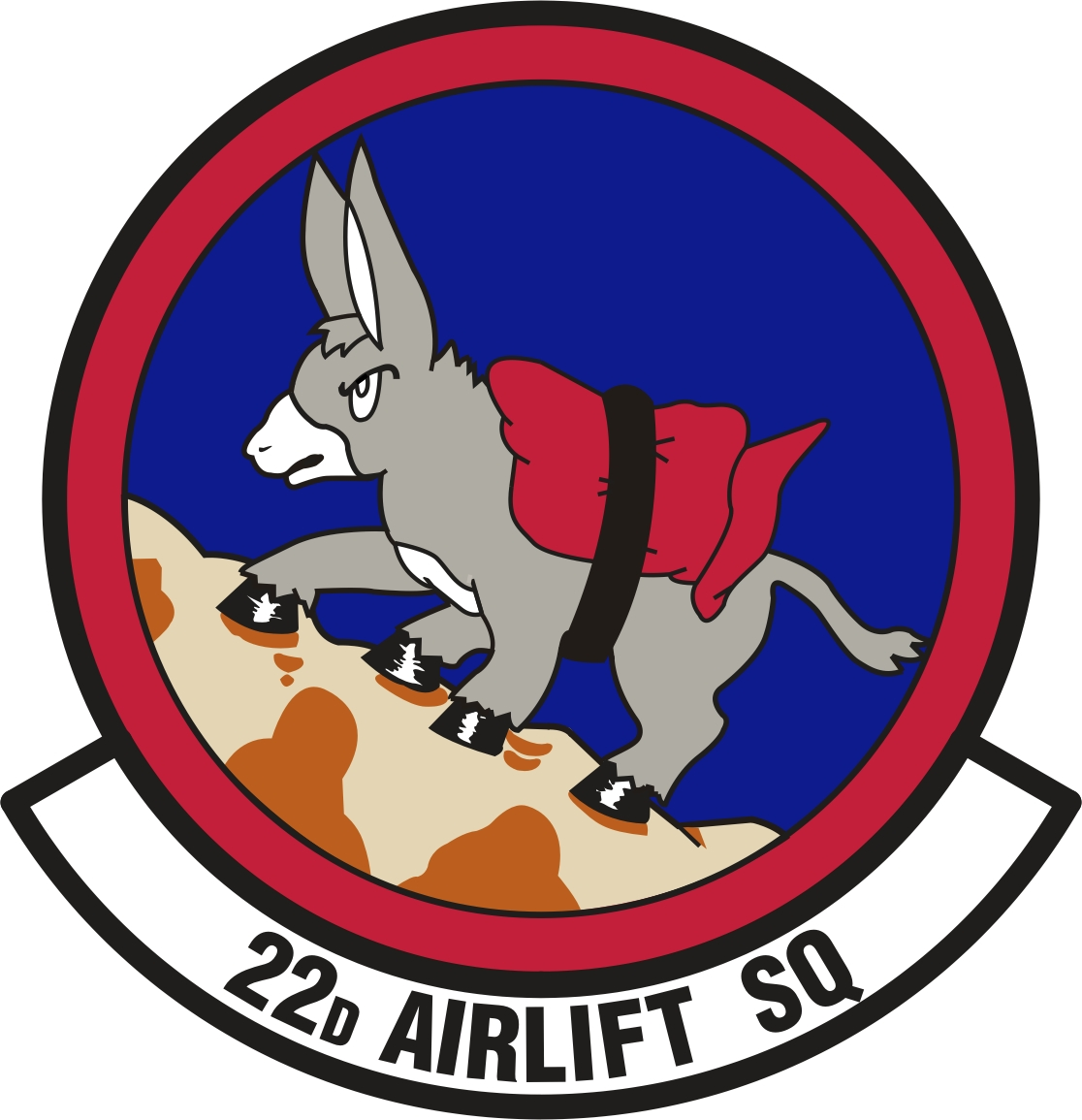
22 AS

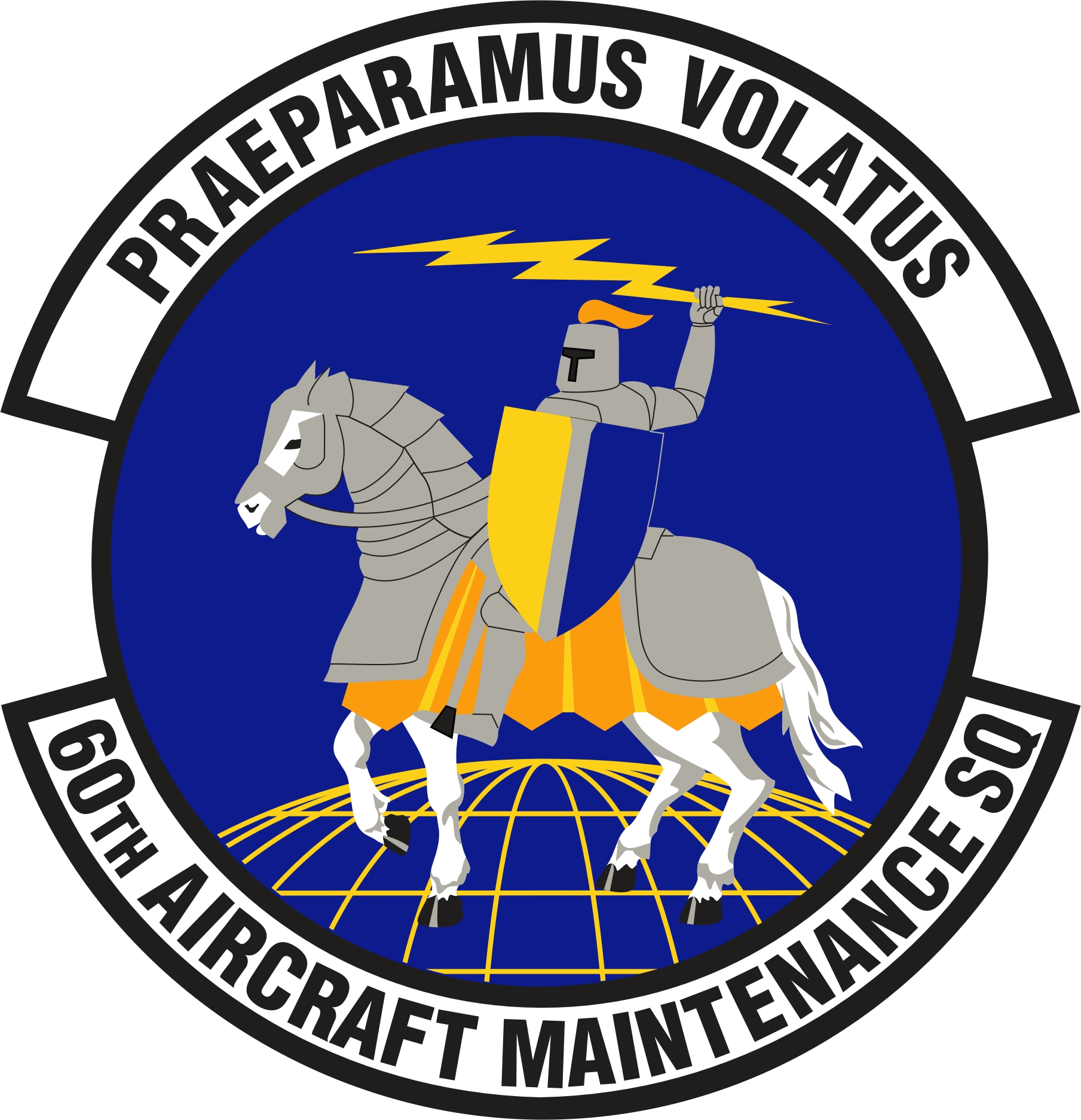
60 AMXS
