= 1501st Air Transport Wing =

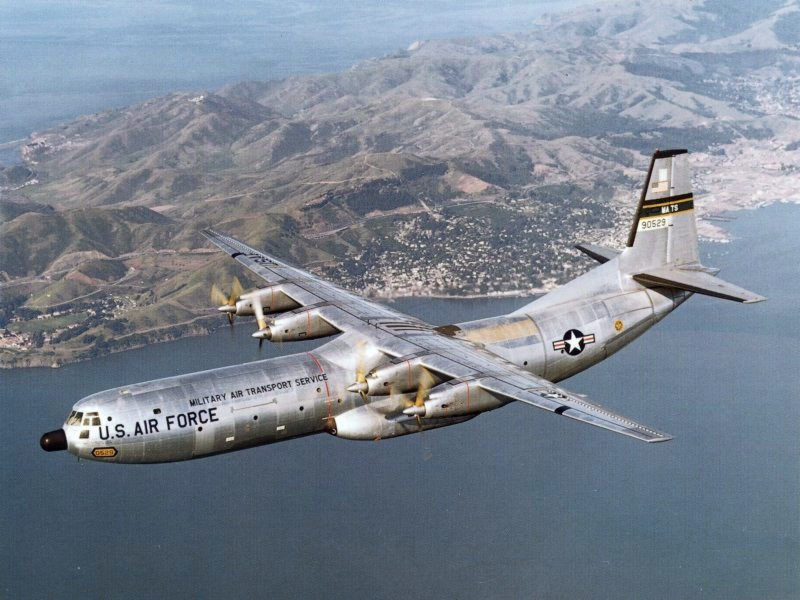
- Douglas C-133 Cargomaster
- Active: 1948–1966
- Country: United States
- Branch: United States Air Force
- Role: Airlift
- Part of: Military Air Transport Service

Insignia
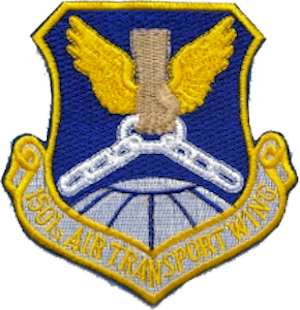
- 1501st Air Transport Wing emblem

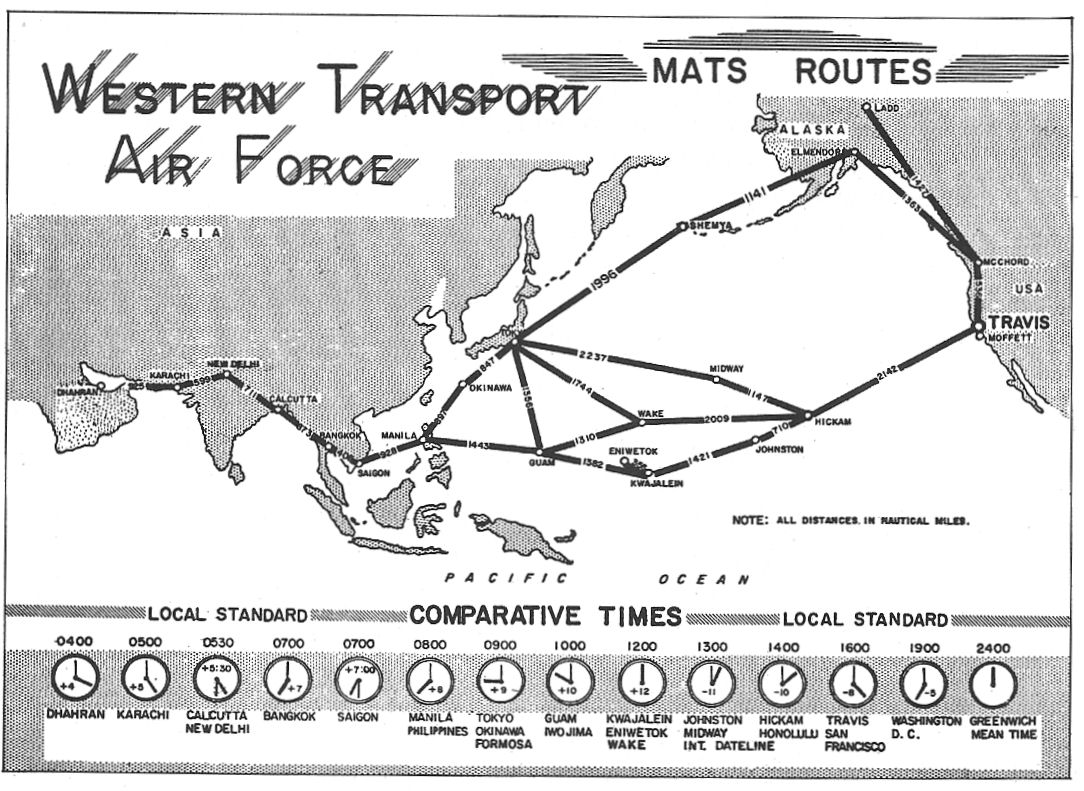
Route map of the Western Transport Air Force, 1964

The 1501st Air Transport Wing is an inactive United States Air Force unit, being inactivated on 8 January 1966.

The 1501st Air Transport Wing was a heavy cargo transport wing of the Military Air Transport Service (MATS), formed on 1 June 1948. The unit was originally designated as the 530th Air Transport Wing and assigned to the MATS Pacific Division. The wing was stationed at Travis Air Force Base, California.

The 1501st was discontinued on 8 January 1966 as part of the replacement of MATS by Military Airlift Command. Its aircraft, personnel and equipment were transferred to the Military Airlift Command 60th Military Airlift Wing, which was activated at Travis the same day.

== History ==
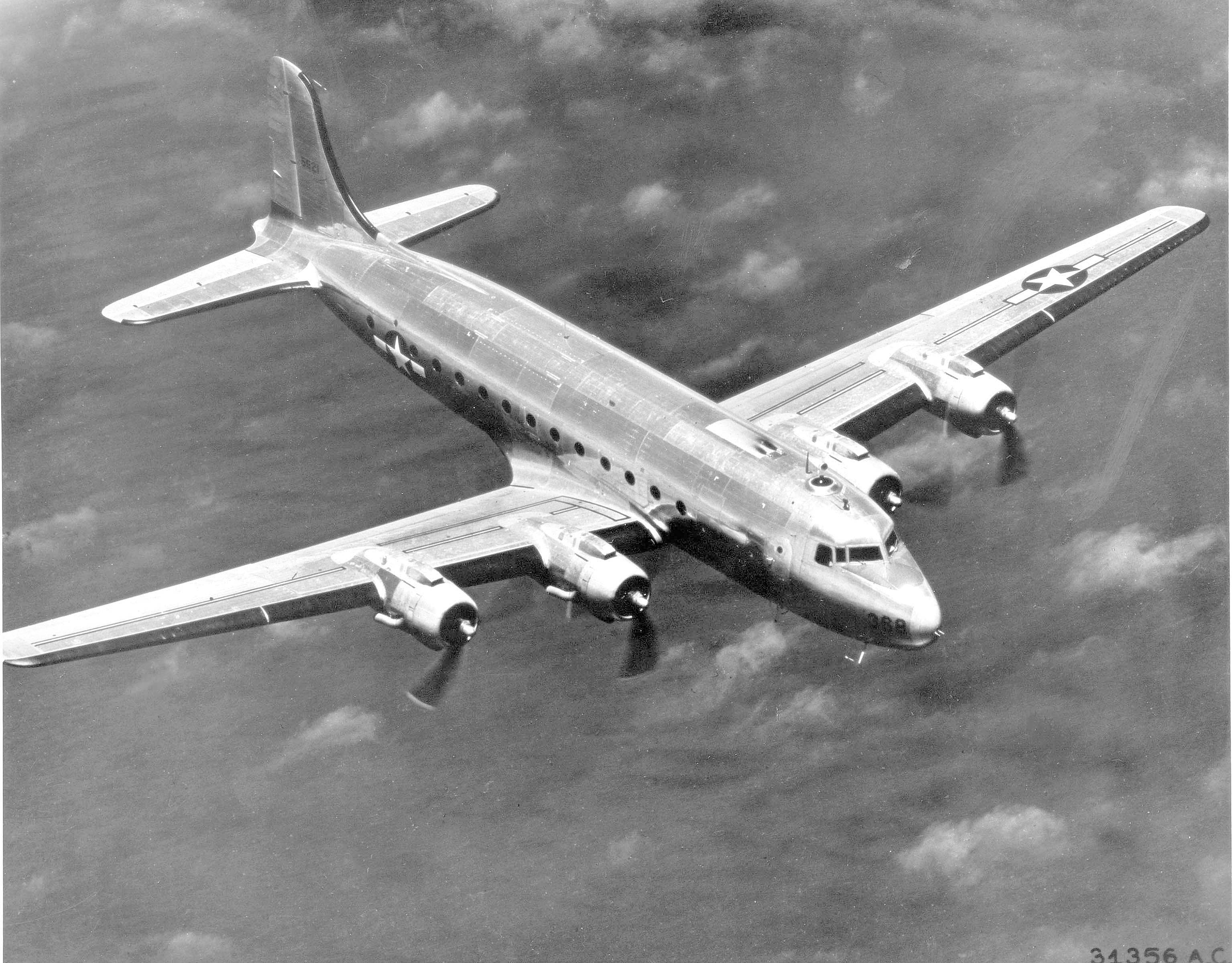
Douglas C-54 Skymaster

Established on 1 June 1948 concurrent with the activation of the Military Air Transport Service; assumed responsibility for mission previously carried out by the Air Transport Command by transporting cargo and personnel to destinations within Far East Air Force and to the Continental United States.

Also operated MATS West Coast's aerial embarkation and debarkation point. C-118 Liftmasters and C-121 Constellations were common sights in the 1950s, while C-135 Stratolifters and C-141 Starlifters were used in the 1960 for passenger transport, mostly to destinations in Southeast Asia or Japan. Many soldiers, sailors, airmen or marines returned to the United States from the Vietnam War via the Travis Aerial Port.

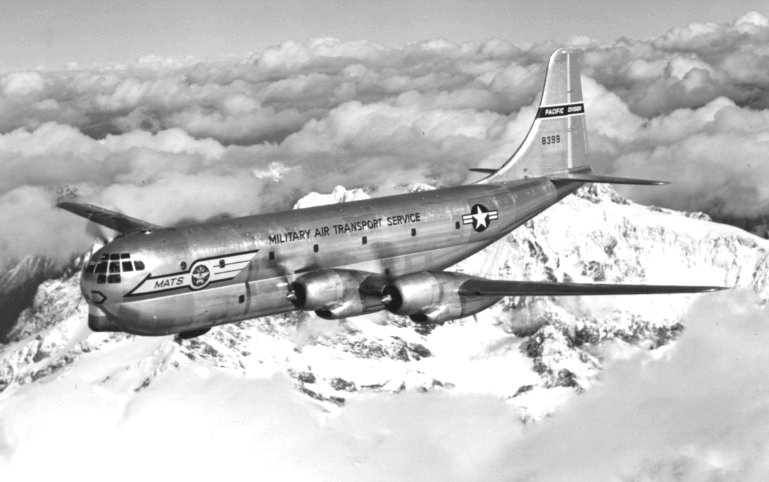
C-97 Stratofreighter

The 530th Air Transport Group was organized from a consolidation of the Air Transport Command (ATC) Eastern Pacific Wing and Naval Air Transport Squadrons. Its first commander was Brigadier General Harold Q. Huglin. It was initially equipped with four squadrons of C-54 Skymasters that could reach the Continental US, but required intermediate stopovers along the Pacific Transport Routes to stations as far as Pakistan. However, the demands of the Berlin Airlift for C-54s led to two of the group's squadrons being deployed to Germany in July 1948. Unit was redesignated as 1501st Air Transport Wing in October 1948 and assigned transport squadrons were also redesignated in a MATS reorganization.

In May 1949, Fairfield-Suisun was realigned from MATS to Strategic Air Command jurisdiction, and all of the Wing's squadrons were reassigned to the 1500 ATW at Hickam AFB on 30 June. Wing was reduced to a group level and operated an Aeromedical Transport Squadron.

In 1953, large-scale MATS operations were resumed when five C-97 Stratofreighter squadrons were activated. Returned to wing status in 1955. C-97 squadrons reduced to four in 1955 due to finding reductions. 75th & 85th ATS replaced C-97s with C-124 Globemaster IIs in 1957. 84th ATS re-equipped with C-133 Cargomasters in 1957. 47th ATS reassigned from Hickam in 1957 with C-97s.

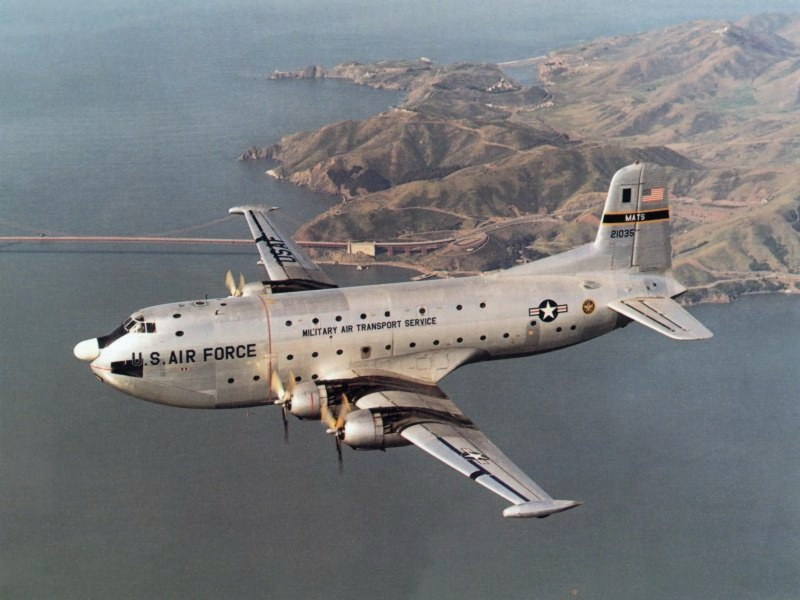
C-124 Globemaster II

22d Air Force arrived from Kelly AFB, TX, 25 June 1958 and the base's primary mission reverted to global airlift activities when MATS resumed jurisdiction. 1501 ATW was also reassigned to the Western Transport Air Force on 1 July 1958. Both 47th and 55th ATS inactivated in 1960, C-97s reassigned to reserves.

44th ATS activated in 1961 with jet C-135 Stratolifters. 86th ATW activated in 1963 with extended-range MATS C-130E Hercules. The 1501st ATW was inactivated on 8 January 1966 as part of the inactivation of MATS, its aircraft, personnel and equipment being assigned to the Military Airlift Command 60th Military Airlift Wing.

=== Major airlifts ===
- In 1956, MATS airlifted iron lungs and other medical equipment to Buenos Aires, Argentina, during a polio epidemic.
- In 1960, when the Ceara and Tiauim areas of Brazil were devastated by floods, MATS C-124's airlifted emergency equipment, medical supplies, and two helicopters to the scene. Also flew 77 mercy missions to Chile when earthquakes literally remade parts of that country. Homeless millions were aided by 877 tons of clothing, food, helicopters, and medical supplies, including two complete Army field hospitals. The longest airlift MATS had flown to that time, average flying time one way was 25 hours to cover 4,500 miles.
- From 1957–1963, MATS C-124 Globemasters conducted six years of seasonal flying as members of the Air Force-Navy team resupplying scientific stations in the Antarctic. During that time the aircraft air-dropped about 4,000 tons of supplies from the main Antarctic base at McMurdo Sound to remote stations near and at the South Pole. Beginning in 1963, Lockheed C-130E Hercules, newer, faster, and longer range, picked up the MATS portion of the mission. The performance of the C-124's in the Antarctic cold strengthened the concept of airlift flexibility by doing in a few weeks (each year) a job that would have taken surface transportation several months. During Deep Freeze III, a C-124 air-dropped a seven-ton tractor to an isolated site, and during Deep Freeze 62 (October–December 1961), three C-124's made the longest flight in Antarctic history, a 3,100-mile round trip to airdrop supplies. Also during Deep Freeze 62, Lt. Gen. Joe W. Kelly became the first MATS commander to visit the operation. MATS vice commander, Maj. Gen. Raymond J. Reeves, visited Deep Freeze 63.
- In 1959, a MATS C-133 Cargomaster airlifted, for the first time, an Atlas intercontinental ballistic missile – from Miramar Naval Air Station, San Diego, to ARDC's Ballistic Missile Division at Francis E. Warren Air Force Base, Wyoming.
- In 1960, MATS almost doubled its aircraft flying rate during March in a test of its ability to surge to a wartime pace. As part of this exercise, it joined with the Army in the largest peacetime airlift exercise in military history (Big Slam Puerto Pine), airlifting 21,095 troops and 10,925 tons of their combat equipment from the U.S. to Puerto Rico and back.

== Lineage ==
- Designated as the 530th Air Transport Wing on 14 May 1948

Organized on 1 June 1948
Redesignated 1501st Air Transport Wing on 1 October 1948
Redesignated 1704th Air Transport Wing on 1 January 1950
Redesignated 1501st Air Transport Wing, Heavy on 1 July 1952
Discontinued on 8 January 1966

=== Assignments ===
- Pacific Division, MATS, 1 June 1948
- Continental Division, MATS, 1 January 1950
- Pacific Division, MATS, 1 July 1952
- Western Transport Air Force, 1 Jul 1958 – 8 Jan 1966

=== Components ===
Operational Group

- 530th Air Transport Group (later 1501st Air Transport Group, 1704th Air Transport Group, 1501st Air Transport Group), 1 June 1948 – 18 January 1963

Operational Squadrons

- 44th Air Transport Squadron, 18 January 1963 – 8 January 1966
- 75th Air Transport Squadron, 18 January 1963 – 8 January 1966
- 84th Air Transport Squadron, 18 January 1963 – 8 January 1966
- 85th Air Transport Squadron, 18 January 1963 – 8 January 1966
- 86th Air Transport Squadron, 18 January 1963 – 8 January 1966

=== Stations ===
- Fairfield-Suisun Air Force Base (later Travis Air Force Base), California, 1 June 1948 – 8 January 1966

=== Aircraft ===
- C-54 Skymaster
- C-97 Stratofreighter
- C-124 Globemaster II
- C-133 Cargomaster
- C-135 Stratolifter
- C-130E Hercules
- Convair C-131 Samaritan
