= 44th Military Airlift Squadron =

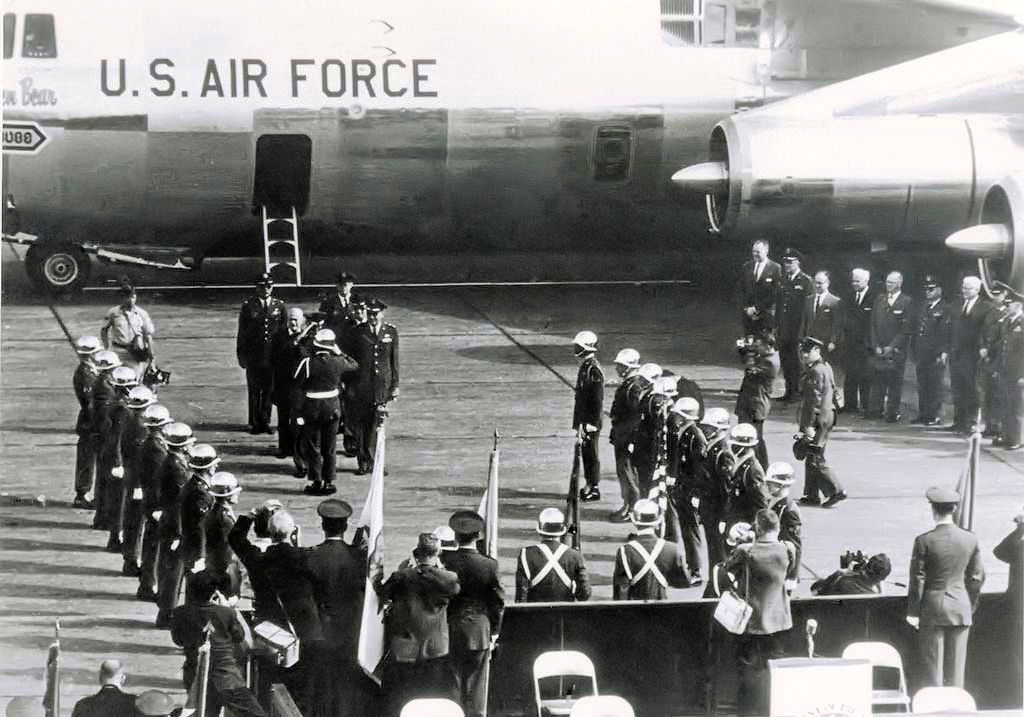
- Arrival ceremony for Lockheed C-141A-10-LM Starlifter(Tail 63-8088) at Travis Air Force Base, CA on 23 April 1965. Known as the "Golden Bear", This plane was the first production C-141 Starlifter to see active service. It was assigned to the 44th Air Transport Squadron, 1501st Air Transport Wing at Travis
- Active: 1955-1972
- Country: United States
- Branch: United States Air Force
- Type: Strategic Airlift

Insignia
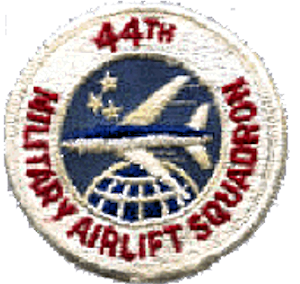
- Patch with 44th Military Airlift Squadron emblem

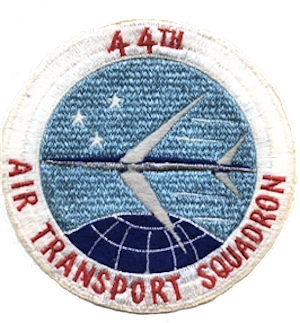
- Patch with 44th Air Transport Squadron emblem

The 44th Military Airlift Squadron is an inactive United States Air Force unit. Its last assignment was with the 60th Military Airlift Wing of Military Airlift Command at Travis Air Force Base, California.

In 1965, the 44th was the first USAF squadron to receive the Lockheed C-141 Starlifter. It was inactivated on 1 March 1972.

== History ==
=== World War II ===
The squadron was first organized during World War II in the Mediterranean Theater of Operations as a ferrying unit. It was disbanded in September 1943 and replaced by Station 10, North African Wing, Air Transport Command in a general reorganization of Air Transport Command.

=== Cold War ===
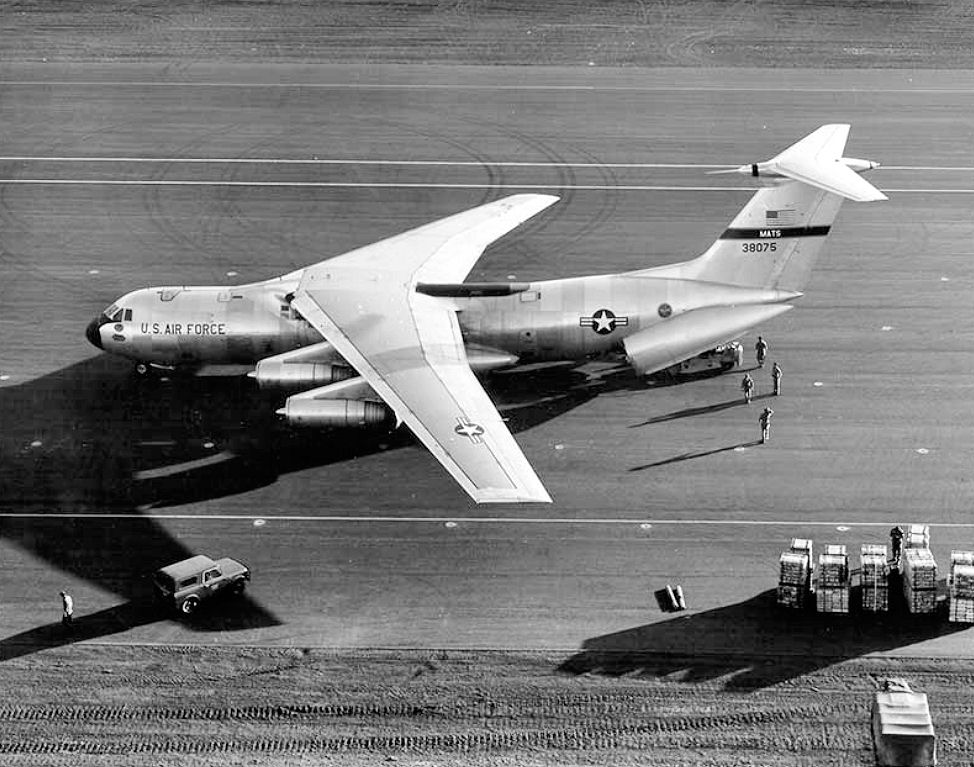
A C-141A 63-6075 60th MAW on the ramp at Tan Son Nhut AB, South Vietnam, July 1966

The squadron was reconstituted as the 44th Air Transport Squadron in 1953 at Grenier Air Force Base, New Hampshire, when Military Air Transport Service (MATS) assumed responsibility for the base from Air Defense Command. MATS operations at Grenier were short-lived, however and in November 1955 the squadron moved to McGuire Air Force Base, New Jersey, where it was inactivated.

Reactivated in 1961 at Travis Air Force Base, California as a Boeing C-135 Stratolifter strategic airlift squadron, it operated these aircraft over the Pacific and around the world transport routes under MATS. It became the first organization to use jets while airlifting Bob Hope Christmas tours to the Far East in 1963. On 23 April 1965, the squadron received the first operational Lockheed C-141 Starlifter, which it operated over MATS and later Military Airlift Command routes on a worldwide basis, 1965–1972. The squadron frequently flew cargo and personnel to United States bases in South Vietnam and Thailand during the Vietnam War. It was inactivated in 1972 due to budget restrictions as part of the post-Vietnam drawdown of the USAF.

== Lineage ==
- Constituted as the 44th Ferrying Squadron

Activated on 15 September 1942
Redesignated 44th Transport Squadron on 24 March 1943
Disbanded on 30 September 1943

- Reconstituted as the 44th Air Transport Squadron, Heavy on 20 April 1953 and activated

Redesignated 44th Air Transport Squadron, Medium c. 1 July 1953
Inactivated on 14 November 1955

- Redesignated 44th Air Transport Squadron, Heavy

Activated on 1 November 1961
Redesignated 44th Military Airlift Squadron on 8 January 1966
Inactivated on 1 March 1972

=== Assignments ===
- 13th Ferrying Group, 15 September 1942 – 30 September 1943
- Atlantic Division, Military Air Transport Service, 20 April 1953
- 1610th Air Transport Group, c. 1 July 1953
- 1611th Air Transport Group, 9–14 November 1955
- 1501st Air Transport Group, 1 November 1961
- 1501st Air Transport Wing, 18 January 1963
- 60th Military Airlift Wing, 8 January 1966 – 1 March 1972 (not operational after 1 January 1972)

=== Stations ===
- Khartoum, Anglo-Egyptian Sudan, 15 September 1942
- Wadi Seidna Air Base, Anglo-Egyptian Sudan, c. 1943 – 30 September 1943
- Grenier Air Force Base, New Hampshire, 20 April 1953
- McGuire Air Force Base, New Jersey, 9 - 14 Nov 1955
- Travis Air Force Base, California, 1 Nov 1961 - 1 Mar 1972

=== Aircraft ===
- C-135B Stratolifter, 1961–1965
- C-141 Starlifter, 1965-1972
