= 11th Airlift Flight =

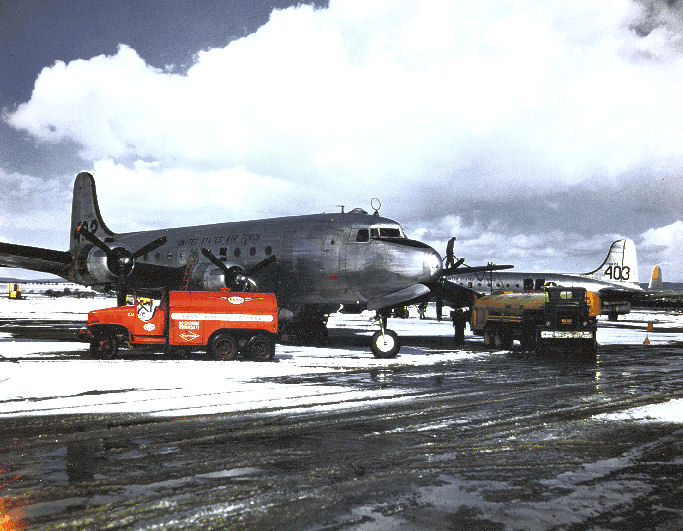
- 11th Troop Carrier Squadron C-54 Skymasters during the Berlin Airlift, 1948
- Active: 1940–1945; 1946–1961; 1993–1997
- Country: United States
- Branch: United States Air Force
- Type: Airlift
- Engagements: American Service World War II European-African-Middle East Campaign World War II: Algeria-French Morocco with Arrowhead; Tunisia; Sicily; Naples-Foggia; Anzio; Rome-Arno; North Apennines; Po Valley

- Decorations: Distinguished Unit Citation: (MTO)

Insignia
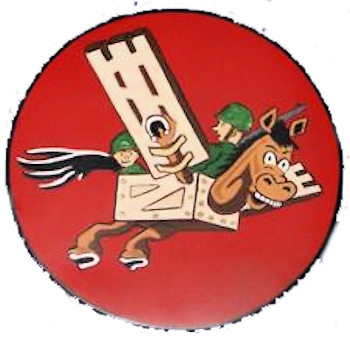
- 11th Troop Carrier Squadron Emblem (approved 14 July 1945)

The 11th Airlift Flight is an inactive United States Air Force unit. It was last active as part of the 55th Operations Group at Offutt Air Force Base, Nebraska, where it was inactivated in April 1997.

== History ==
=== World War II ===
Established as part of the Army Air Corps in January 1938 at Olmsted Field, Pennsylvania but not activated until 1 December 1940. Not equipped or manned. Unit designation transferred to Westover Field, Massachusetts, but not equipped or manned until after the Pearl Harbor Attack. Equipped with Douglas C-47 Skytrain transports and trained for combat resupply and casualty evacuation mission.

Was ordered deployed to England, assigned to Eighth Air Force in June 1942. Assigned fuselage code 7D. Performed intro-theater transport flights of personnel, supply and equipment within England during summer and fall of 1942, reassigned to Twelfth Air Force after Operation Torch invasion of North Africa, stationed at Tafaraoui Airfield, Algeria. In combat, performed resupply and evacuation missions across Morocco, Algeria and Tunisia during North African Campaign. During June 1943, the unit began training with gliders in preparation for Operation Husky, the invasion of Sicily. It towed gliders to Syracuse, Sicily and dropped paratroopers at Catania during the operation. After moving to Sicily, the squadron airdropped supplies to escaped prisoners of war in Northern Italy in October. Operated from Sicily until December until moving to Italian mainland in December.

Supported Italian Campaign during the balance of 1944 supporting partisans in the Balkans. Its unarmed aircraft flew at night over uncharted territory, landing at small unprepared airfields to provide guns, ammunition, clothing, medical supplies, gasoline, and mail to the partisans. It even carried jeeps and mules as cargo. On return trips it evacuated wounded partisans, evadees and escaped prisoners. These operations earned the squadron the Distinguished Unit Citation. It also dropped paratroopers at Megava, Greece in October 1944 and propaganda leaflets in the Balkans in the Mediterranean Theater of Operations until end of combat in Europe, May, 1945.

After hostilities ended, was transferred to Waller Field, Trinidad attached to the Air Transport Command Transported personnel and equipment from Brazil to South Florida along the South Atlantic Air Transport Route. Squadron picked up personnel and equipment in Brazil or bases in Northern South America with final destination being Miami Army Air Field, Boca Raton Army Air Field or Morrison Fields in south Florida.

=== European airlift operations ===
Was reassigned to the United States Air Forces in Europe (USAFE), September 1946, performing intratheater cargo flights based at Munich-Riem Airport. Transferred to Kaufbeuren Air Base when Reim Airport was closed. Was re-equipped with Douglas C-54 Skymaster aircraft and deployed to RAF Fassberg during 1948 Berlin Airlift. Flew continuous missions across hostile Soviet Zone of Germany in Berlin Air Corridor, transporting supplies and equipment to airports in West Berlin, 1948-1949. Later operated from Rhein-Main Air Base and Wiesbaden Air Base in American Zone of Occupation, later West Germany until blockade ended. Remained as part of USAFE until 1961, being upgraded to Fairchild C-82 Packet and later Fairchild C-119 Flying Boxcar transports as part of USAFE 322d Air Division based in West Germany and France. Inactivated as part of downsizing of USAFE bases in France, 1961.

=== Operational support airlift ===
The squadron was redesignated the 11th Airlift Flight and activated at Offutt Air Force Base, Nebraska to provide operational support airlift with Learjet C-21s, primarily for senior members of United States Strategic Command. It was inactivated in April 1997, when Air Mobility Command assumed responsibility for this mission and its mission, personnel and equipment were transferred to the 311th Airlift Flight, which was simultaneously activated.

== Lineage ==
- Constituted as the 11th Transport Squadron on 1 January 1938

Activated on 1 December 1940
Redesignated 11th Troop Carrier Squadron on 5 July 1942
Inactivated on 31 July 1945

- Activated on 30 September 1946

Redesignated: 11th Troop Carrier Squadron, Medium on 1 July 1948
Redesignated: 11th Troop Carrier Squadron, Heavy on 5 November 1948
Redesignated: 11th Troop Carrier Squadron, Medium on 16 November 1949
Discontinued and inactivated, on 8 January 1961

- Redesignated 11th Airlift Flight

Activated on 1 May 1993
Inactivated on 1 April 1997

=== Assignments ===
- Eighth Corps Area, 1 January 1938 (not active)
- 60th Transport Group (later 60th Troop Carrier Group), 1 December 1940 – 31 July 1945
- 60th Troop Carrier Group, 30 September 1946 (attached to 313th Troop Carrier Group 26 November 1948 – 16 May 1949, 60th Troop Carrier Wing after 15 November 1956)
- 60th Troop Carrier Wing, 12 March 1957
- 322d Air Division, 25 September 1958 – 8 January 1961
- 55th Operations Group, 1 May 1993 – 1 April 1997

=== Stations ===
- Olmsted Field, Pennsylvania, 1 December 1940
- Westover Field, Massachusetts, 21 May 1941 – 20 May 1942
- RAF Chelveston, England, 11 June 1942
- RAF Aldermaston, England, 7 August 1942
- Tafaraoui Airfield, Algeria, 8 November 1942
- Relizane Airfield, Algeria, c. 27 November 1942
- Thiersville Airfield, Algeria, c. 14 May 1943
- El Djem Airfield, Tunisia, 26 June 1943
- Gela Airfield, Sicily, 6 September 1943
- Gerbini Airfield, Sicily, c. 7 November 1943
- Pomigliano Airfield, Italy, 12 December 1943
- Brindisi Airfield, Italy, 6 April 1944
- Pomigliano Airfield, Italy, 25 October 1944 – 23 May 1945
- Waller Field, Trinidad, 4 June – 31 July 1945
- AAF Station Munich-Reim, Germany, 30 September 1946
- Kaufbeuren Air Base, Germany, 8 May 1948
- Wiesbaden Air Base, Germany, 10 August 1948
- Kaufbeuren Air Base, Germany, 18 October 1948 (operated from RAF Fassberg, West Germany after 26 November 1948)
- Wiesbaden Air Base, West Germany, 16 May 1949
- Rhein-Main Air Base, West Germany, 26 September 1949
- Wiesbaden Air Base, West Germany, 20 October 1949
- Rhein-Main Air Base, West Germany, 5 July 1950
- Dreux-Louvilliers Air Base, France, 23 September 1955 – 8 January 1961
- Offutt Air Force Base, Nebraska, 1 May 1993 – 1 April 1997

=== Aircraft ===
- Douglas C-47 Skytrain (1942–1945, 1946–1948)
- Douglas C-54 Skymaster (1948–1949)
- Fairchild C-82 Packet (1949–1953)
- Fairchild C-119 Flying Boxcar (1953–1960)
- Learjet C-21 (1993-1997)
