= 12th Airlift Flight =

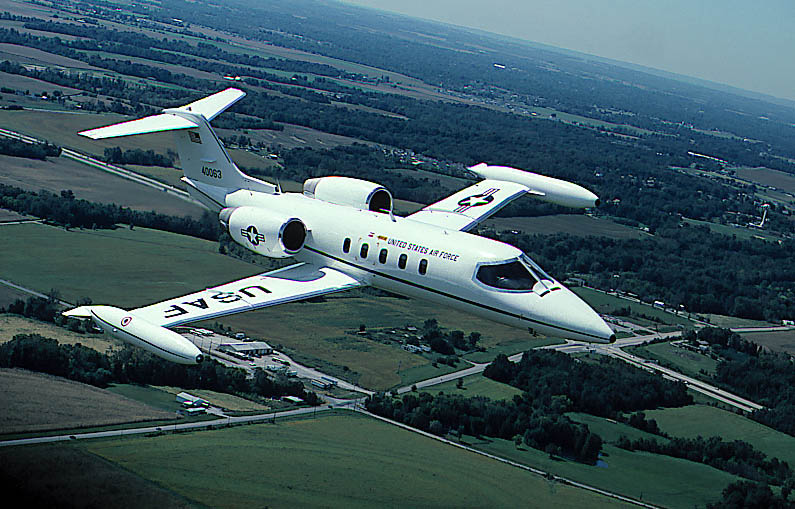
- 375th Operations Group C-21 Learjet
- Active: 1940–1945; 1946-1961; 1993–2005
- Country: United States
- Branch: United States Air Force
- Role: Airlift
- Part of: Air Combat Command
- Engagements: Mediterranean Theater of Operations
- Decorations: Distinguished Unit Citation; Air Force Outstanding Unit Award

Insignia
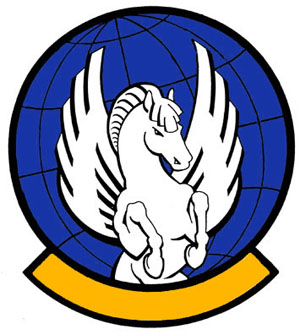
- 12th Airlift Flight emblem (approved 7 February 1994)

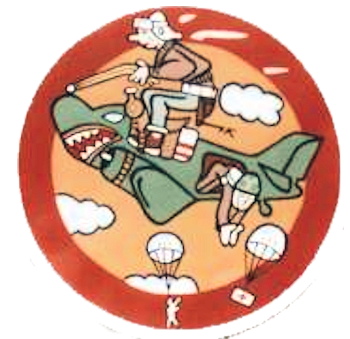
- 12th Troop Carrier Squadron emblem (approved 11 September 1944)

The 12th Airlift Flight is an inactive United States Air Force unit.

As the 12th Troop Carrier Squadron it served with the 322d Air Division stationed at Dreux-Louvilliers Air Base, France, where it was inactivated on 8 January 1961.

== History ==
=== World War II ===
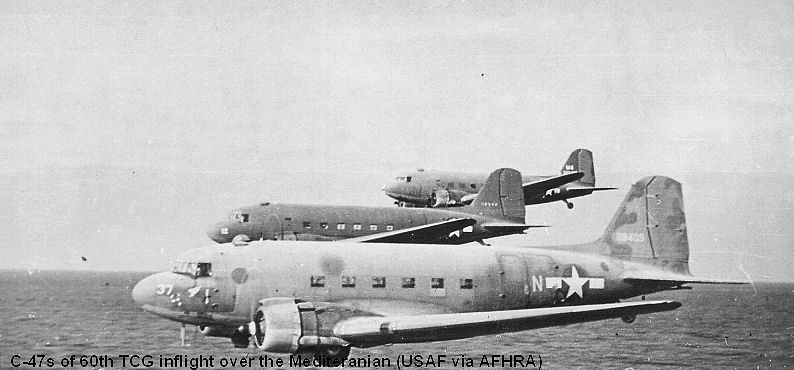
60th Troop Carrier Group C-47s

Established as part of the Army Air Corps in January 1938 at Olmsted Field, Pennsylvania but not activated until 1 December 1940. Unit designation transferred to Westover Field, Massachusetts, but not equipped or crewed until after the Pearl Harbor Attack. Equipped with Douglas C-47 Skytrain transports and trained for combat resupply and casualty evacuation mission.

Was ordered deployed to England, assigned to Eighth Air Force in June 1942. Performed intra-theater transport flights of personnel, supply and equipment within England during summer and fall of 1942, reassigned to Twelfth Air Force after Operation Torch invasion of North Africa, stationed at Tafaraoui Airfield, Algeria. In combat, performed resupply and evacuation missions across Morocco, Algeria and Tunisia during North African Campaign. During June 1943, the unit began training with gliders in preparation for Operation Husky, the invasion of Sicily. It towed gliders to Syracuse, Sicily and dropped paratroopers at Catania during the operation. After moving to Sicily, the squadron airdropped supplies to escaped prisoners of war in Northern Italy in October. Operated from Sicily until December until moving to Italian mainland in December.

Supported Italian Campaign during balance of 1944 supporting partisans in the Balkans. Its unarmed aircraft flew at night over uncharted territory, landing at small unprepared airfields to provide guns, ammunition, clothing, medical supplies, gasoline, and mail to the partisans. It even carried jeeps and mules as cargo. On return trips it evacuated wounded partisans, evadees and escaped prisoners. These operations earned the squadron the Distinguished Unit Citation. It also dropped paratroopers at Megava, Greece in October 1944 and propaganda leaflets in the Balkans in the Mediterranean Theater of Operations until end of combat in Europe, May, 1945.

After hostilities ended, was transferred to Waller Field, Trinidad attached to the Air Transport Command Transported personnel and equipment from Brazil to South Florida along the South Atlantic Air Transport Route. Squadron picked up personnel and equipment in Brazil or bases in Northern South America with final destination being Miami, Boca Raton Army Airfield or Morrison Fields in South Florida.

=== European service ===
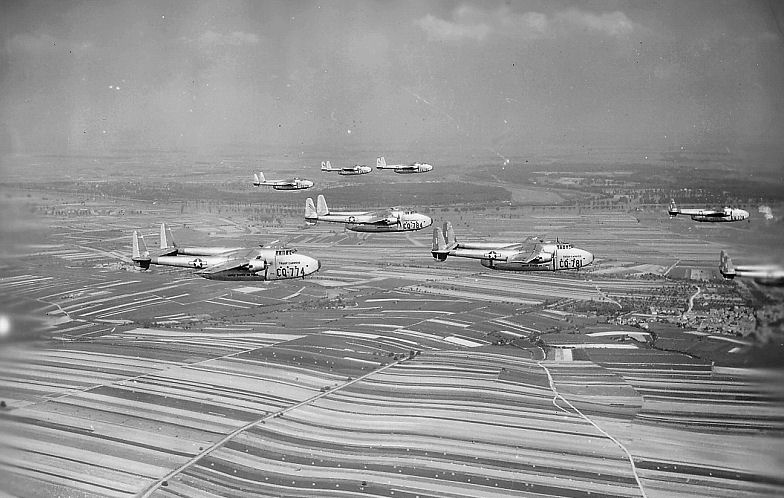
Squadron C-82 Packets over Europe, 1952

Was reassigned to the United States Air Forces in Europe (USAFE), September 1946, performing intro-theater cargo flights based at Munich Air Base. Transferred to Kaufbeuren Air Base when Munich Air Base became a civilian airport. Was re-equipped with Douglas C-54 Skymaster aircraft and deployed to RAF Fassberg during 1948 Berlin Airlift. Flew continuous missions across hostile Soviet Zone of Germany in Berlin Air Corridor, transporting supplies and equipment to airports in West Berlin, 1948-1949. Later operated from Rhein-Main Air Base and Wiesbaden Air Base in American Zone of Occupation, later part of West Germany, until blockade ended. Remained as part of USAFE until 1961, being upgraded to Fairchild C-82 Packet and later Fairchild C-119 Flying Boxcar transports as part of USAFE 322d Air Division based in West Germany and France. Inactivated as part of downsizing of USAFE bases in France, 1961.

=== Executive airlift ===
The squadron was redesignated the 12th Airlift Flight and activated at Langley Air Force Base in May 1993. It was equipped with C-21 Learjets to provide airlift for high ranking officers of Air Combat Command and other headquarters in the Norfolk-Hampron Roads area. In 1997, this mission was transferred to Air Mobility Command. The flight continued the mission until it was inactivated at the end of July 2005.

== Lineage ==
- Constituted as the 12th Transport Squadron on 1 January 1938

Activated on 1 December 1940
Redesignated 12th Troop Carrier Squadron on 5 July 1942
Inactivated on 31 July 1945

- Activated on 30 September 1946

Redesignated: 12th Troop Carrier Squadron, Medium on 1 July 1948
Redesignated: 12th Troop Carrier Squadron, Heavy on 5 November 1948
Redesignated: 12th Troop Carrier Squadron, Medium on 16 November 1949
Discontinued and inactivated on 8 January 1961

- Redesignated 12th Airlift Flight on 1 April 1993

Activated on 1 May 1993
Inactivated on 31 July 2005

=== Assignments ===
- 60th Transport Group (later 60th Troop Carrier) Group), 1 December 1940 – 31 July 1945
- 60th Troop Carrier Group, 30 September 1946
- 60th Troop Carrier Wing, 12 March 1957
- 322d Air Division, 25 September 1958 – 8 January 1961
- 1st Operations Group, 1 May 1993
- 457th Airlift Squadron, 1 April 1997 – 31 July 2005

=== Stations ===
- Olmsted Field, Pennsylvania, 1 December 1940
- Mitchel Field, New York, 20 May 1941
- Westover Field, Massachusetts, 16 December 1941 – 20 May 1942
- RAF Chelveston (Sta 105), England, 10 June 1942
- RAF Aldermaston (Sta 467), England, 7 August 1942
- Tafaraoui Airfield, Algeria, 8 November 1942
- Relizane Airfield, Algeria, 30 November 1942
- Thiersville Airfield, Algeria, 20 May 1943
- El Diem Airfield, Tunisia, 29 June 1943
- Ponte Olivo Airfield, Sicily, Italy, 6 September 1943 (operated from Comiso Airfield, Sicily after 22 October 1943)
- Gerbini Airfield, Sicily, Italy, 9 November 1943
- Brindisi Airfield, Italy, c. 29 March 1944
- Pomigliano Airfield, Italy, 7 October 1944 – May 1945
- Waller Field, Trinidad, 4 June – 31 July 1945
- Rhein-Main Air Base, Germany, 30 September 1946
- Munich Air Base, Germany, 1 November 1946
- Tempelhof Air Base, Germany, 5 May 1947
- Rhein-Main Air Base, Germany, 20 January 1948
- Kaufbeuren Air Base, Germany, 17 April 1948
- Wiesbaden Air Base, Germany, 24 December 1948
- Rhein-Main Air Base Germany, 26 September 1949
- Wiesbaden Air Base, Germany, 20 October 1949
- Rhein-Main Air Base, Germany, 7 July 1950
- Dreux Air Base, France, 13 September 1955 – 8 January 1961
- Langley Air Force Base, Virginia, 1 May 1993 – 31 July 2005

=== Aircraft ===
- Douglas C-47 Skytrain, 1942–1945; 1946–1948
- Douglas C-54 Skymaster, 1948–1949
- Fairchild C-82 Packet, 1949–1953
- Fairchild C-119 Flying Boxcar, 1953–1960
- Gates Learjet C-21 Learjet, 1997-2005
