= 10th Airlift Squadron =

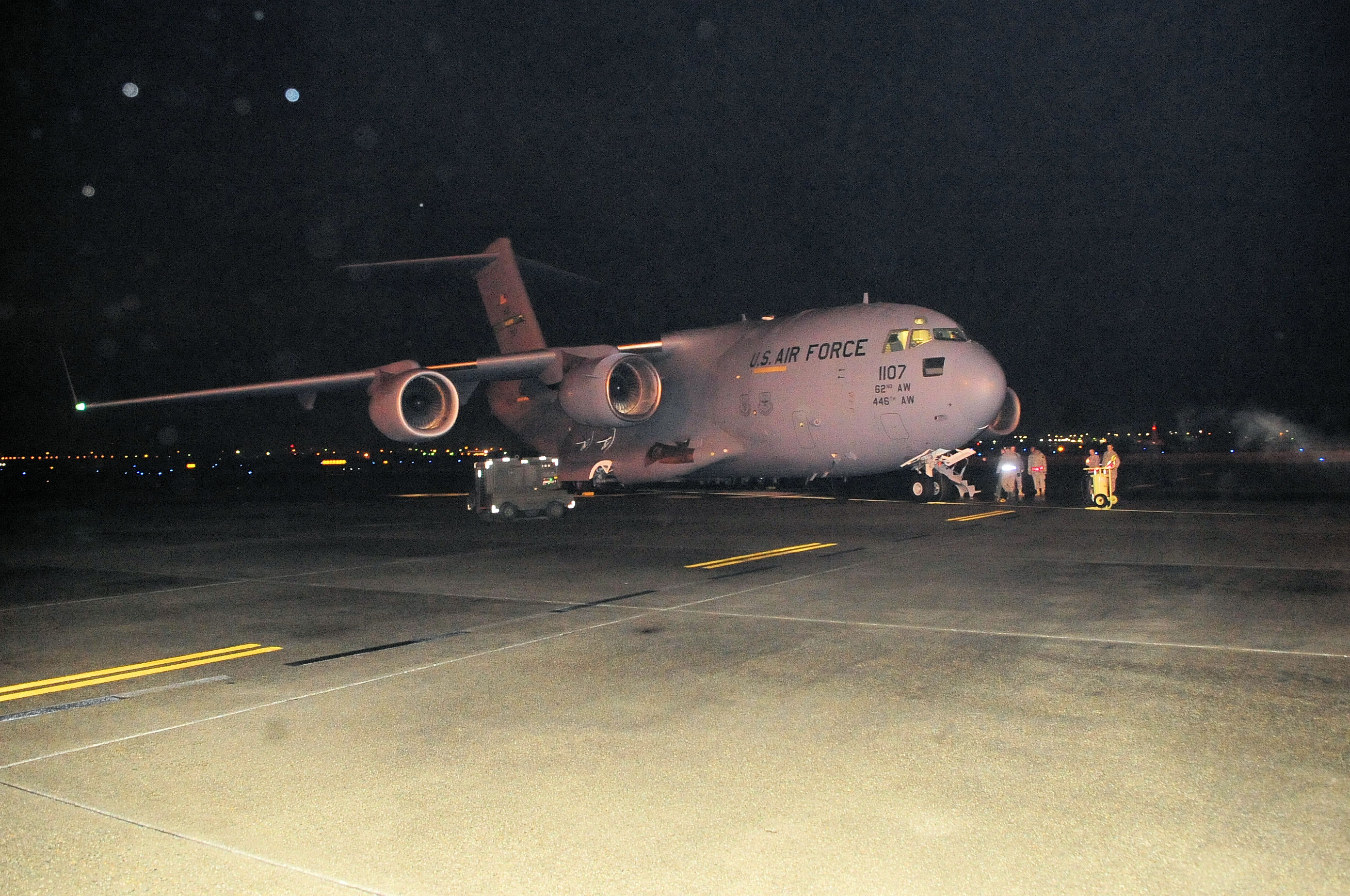
- 10th AS airmen prepare a C-17 Globemaster III for departure from McChord AFB in support of ongoing humanitarian relief efforts in Haiti.
- Active: 1 January 1938 – 6 May 2016
- Country: United States
- Branch: United States Air Force
- Type: Airlift
- Part of: Air Mobility Command
- Garrison/HQ: McChord Air Force Base, Washington
- Engagements: American Service World War II European-African-Middle East Campaign World War II: Algeria-French Morocco with Arrowhead; Tunisia; Sicily; Naples-Foggia; Anzio; Rome-Arno; North Apennines; Po Valley

- Decorations: Distinguished Unit Citation: (MTO) Air Force Outstanding Unit Award (2×)

Insignia
- 10th Airlift Squadron Emblem

The 10th Airlift Squadron (10 AS) was part of the 62d Airlift Wing at McChord Air Force Base, Washington. It operated C-17 Globemaster III aircraft supporting the United States Air Force global reach mission worldwide.

== Mission ==
To train and equip C-17 aircrews for global air-land and airdrop operations.

== History ==
=== World War II ===
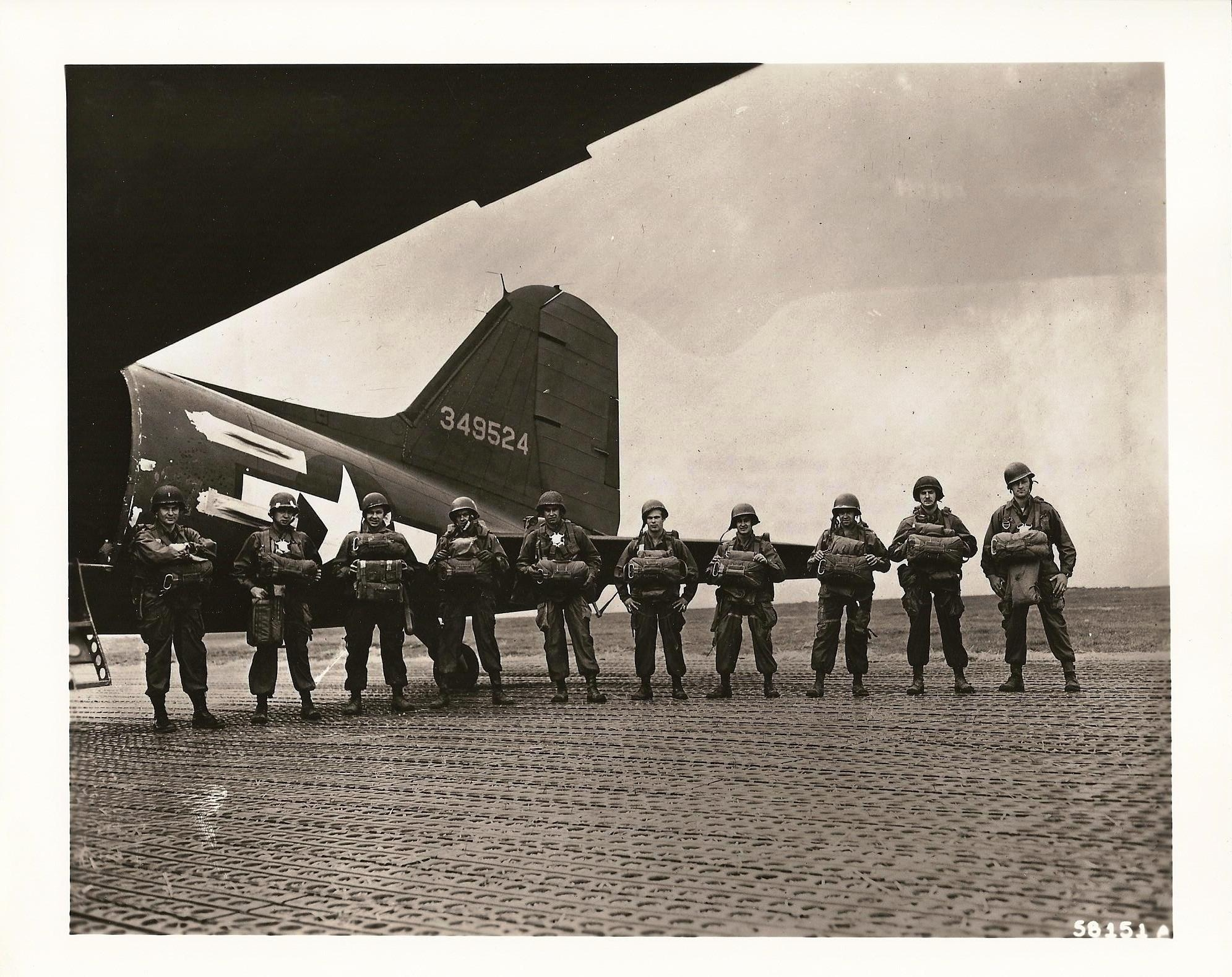
Paratroopers about to board an aircraft of the 10 TCS during World War II

Established as part of the Army Air Corps in January 1938 at Olmsted Field, Pennsylvania but not activated until 1 December 1940. Not equipped or manned. Unit designation transferred to Westover Field, Massachusetts, but not equipped or manned until after the Pearl Harbor Attack. Equipped with C-47 Skytrain transports and trained for combat resupply and casualty evacuation mission.

Was ordered deployed to England, assigned to Eighth Air Force in June 1942. Assigned fuselage code 7D. Performed intro-theater transport flights of personnel, supply and equipment within England during summer and fall of 1942, reassigned to Twelfth Air Force after Operation Torch invasion of North Africa, stationed at Tafaraoui Airfield, Algeria. In combat, performed resupply and evacuation missions across Morocco, Algeria and Tunisia during North African Campaign. During June 1943, the unit began training with gliders in preparation for Operation Husky, the invasion of Sicily. It towed gliders to Syracuse, Sicily and dropped paratroopers at Catania during the operation. After moving to Sicily, the squadron airdropped supplies to escaped prisoners of war in Northern Italy in October. Operated from Sicily until December until moving to Italian mainland in December.

Supported Italian Campaign during balance of 1944 supporting partisans in the Balkans. Its unarmed aircraft flew at night over uncharted territory, landing at small unprepared airfields to provide guns, ammunition, clothing, medical supplies, gasoline, and mail to the partisans. It even carried jeeps and mules as cargo. On return trips it evacuated wounded partisans, evadees and escaped prisoners. These operations earned the squadron the Distinguished Unit Citation. It also dropped paratroopers at Megava, Greece in October 1944 and propaganda leaflets in the Balkans in the Mediterranean Theater of Operations until end of combat in Europe, May 1945.

After hostilities ended, was transferred to Waller Field, Trinidad attached to the Air Transport Command Transported personnel and equipment from Brazil to South Florida along the South Atlantic Air Transport Route. Squadron picked up personnel and equipment in Brazil or bases in Northern South America with final destination being Miami, Boca Raton Army Airfield or Morrison Fields in South Florida.

=== Occupation and Cold War ===
Was reassigned to the United States Air Forces in Europe (USAFE), September 1946, performing intro-theater cargo flights based at Munich-Riem Airport. Transferred to Kaufbeuren AB when Riem Airport was closed. Was re-equipped with C-54 Skymaster aircraft and deployed to RAF Fassberg during 1948 Berlin Airlift. Flew continuous missions across hostile Soviet Zone of Germany in Berlin Air Corridor, transporting supplies and equipment to airports in West Berlin, 1948–1949. Later operated from Rhein-Main AB (where they flew C-82 aircraft on training missions over Europe during the Korean War from 1950-1953, and later C-119 Flying Boxcar transports) and Wiesbaden AB in American Zone of Occupation, later West Germany until blockade ended. Remained as part of USAFE 322d Air Division based in West Germany and France until inactivated in 1961 as part of downsizing of USAFE bases in France.

=== Special airlift ===
Was briefly reactivated in the late 1960s at Chanute AFB, Illinois as a VT-29A VIP transport squadron as part of Tactical Air Command. Conducted airlift tasks in connection with aircraft delivery; in 1970 re-equipped with C-131 Samaritan medical evacuation aircraft. Inactivated September 1970.

=== European shuttle ===
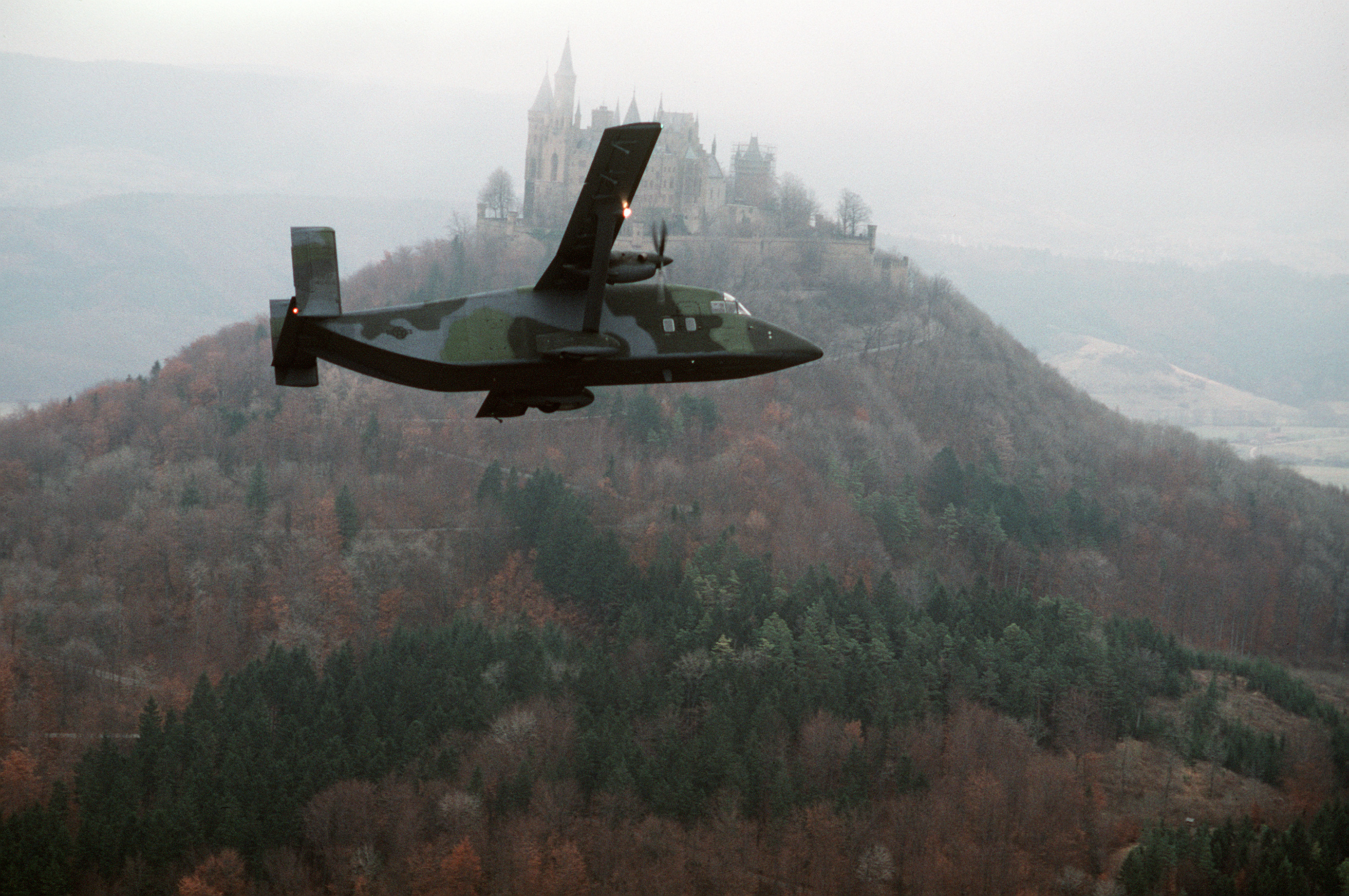
C-23A over the Rhine Valley

Reassigned to USAFE and reactivated in 1984 with C-23 short-range transports for personnel movements within USAFE. Flew scheduled flights from Zweibrücken, Ramstein and other USAFE bases, replacing C-130 European Shuttle flights. Inactivated March 1991 as part of USAFE drawdown at the end of the Cold War.

=== Globemaster training ===
Reactivated in 2003 as C-17 aircrew training squadron at McChord AFB, Washington. On 1 September 2011 more than 100 Airmen from the 10th Airlift Squadron returned from a 120-day deployment at an undisclosed Middle East location in support of Operations Enduring Freedom and New Dawn.

In December 2014 the Air Force announced that the 10th would be inactivated by the summer of 2016. For the fifth time in its 76-year history, the 10th Airlift Squadron was inactivated on 6 May 2016.

== Lineage ==
- Constituted as the 10th Transport Squadron on 1 January 1938

Activated on 1 December 1940
Redesignated 10th Troop Carrier Squadron on 5 July 1942
Inactivated on 31 July 1945

- Activated on 30 September 1946

Redesignated 10th Troop Carrier Squadron, Medium on 1 July 1948
Redesignated 10th Troop Carrier Squadron, Heavy on 5 November 1948
Redesignated 10th Troop Carrier Squadron, Medium on 16 November 1949
Discontinued and inactivated on 8 January 1961

- Redesignated 10th Air Transport Squadron on 5 September 1969

Activated on 15 October 1969
Inactivated on 30 September 1970

- Redesignated 10th Military Airlift Squadron on 1 November 1983

Activated on 15 January 1984
Inactivated on 31 March 1991

- Redesignated 10th Airlift Squadron on 17 December 2002

Activated on 1 October 2003
Inactivated on 6 May 2016

=== Assignments ===
- VIII Corps Area, 1 January 1938 (not active)
- 60th Transport Group (later 60th Troop Carrier Group), 1 December 1940 – 31 July 1945
- 60th Troop Carrier Group, 30 September 1946 (attached to 313th Troop Carrier Group 26 Nov 1948 – 16 May 1949, 60th Troop Carrier Wing after 15 November 1956)
- 60th Troop Carrier Wing, 12 March 1957
- 322d Air Division, 25 September 1958 – 8 January 1961
- 2d Aircraft Delivery Group, 15 October 1969 – 30 September 1970
- 322d Airlift Division, 15 January 1984
- 608th Military Airlift Group, 15 March 1984 – 31 March 1991
- 62d Operations Group, 1 October 2003 – 6 May 2016

=== Stations ===
- Olmsted Field, Pennsylvania, 1 December 1940
- Westover Field, Massachusetts, 21 May 1941 – 20 May 1942
- RAF Chelveston, England, 11 June 1942
- RAF Aldermaston, England, 7 August 1942
- Tafaraoui Airfield, Algeria, 8 November 1942
- Relizane Airfield, Algeria, c. 27 November 1942
- Thiersville Airfield, Algeria, c. 14 May 1943
- El Djem Airfield, Tunisia, 26 June 1943
- Gela Airfield, Sicily, 6 September 1943
- Gerbini Airfield, Sicily, c. 7 November 1943
- Pomigliano Airfield, Italy, 12 December 1943
- Brindisi Airfield, Italy, 6 April 1944
- Pomigliano Airfield, Italy, 25 October 1944 – 23 May 1945
- Waller Field, Trinidad, 4 June – 31 July 1945
- AAF Station Munich-Reim, Germany, 30 September 1946
- Kaufbeuren Air Base, Germany, 8 May 1948
- Wiesbaden Air Base, Germany, 10 August 1948
- Kaufbeuren Air Base, Germany, 18 October 1948 (operated from RAF Fassberg, West Germany after 26 November 1948)
- Wiesbaden Air Base, West Germany, 16 May 1949
- Rhein-Main Air Base, West Germany, 26 September 1949
- Wiesbaden Air Base, West Germany, 20 October 1949
- Rhein-Main Air Base, West Germany, 5 July 1950
- Dreux-Louvilliers Air Base, France, 23 September 1955 – 8 January 1961
- Chanute Air Force Base, Illinois, 15 October 1969 – 30 September 1970
- Zweibrücken Air Base, West Germany, 15 January 1984 – 31 March 1991
- McChord Air Force Base, Washington, 1 October 2003 – 6 May 2016

=== Aircraft ===
- C-47 Skytrain (1942–1945, 1946–1948)
- C-54 Skymaster (1948–1949)
- C-82 Packet (1949–1953)
- C-119 Flying Boxcar (1953–1960)
- VT-29A (1969–1970)
- C-131 Samaritan (1969–1970)
- C-23 (1984–1990)
- C-17 Globemaster III (2003–2016)
