= Ghriss =

- Commune and town
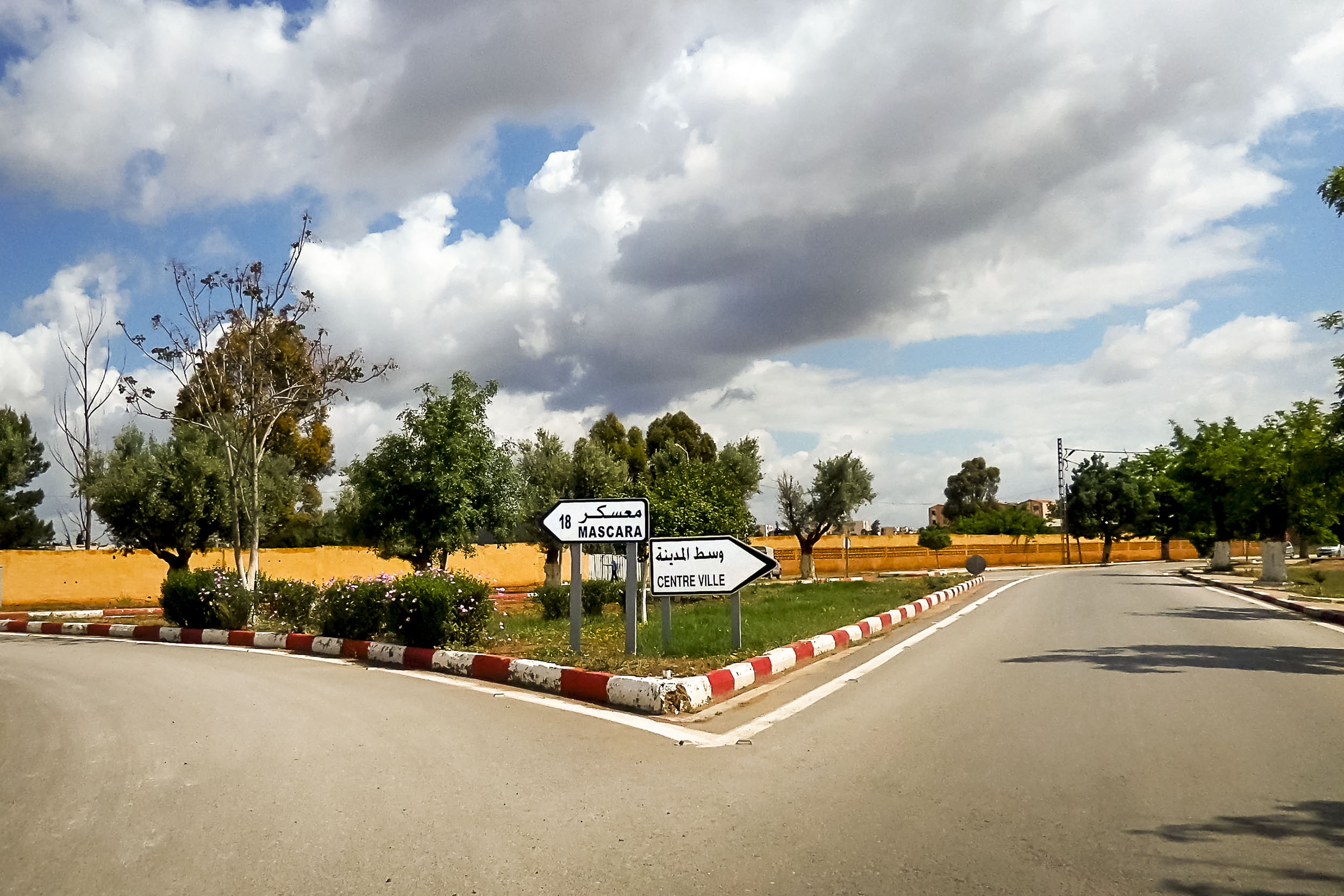

- Location within Algeria
- Country: Algeria
- Province: Mascara Province

Population (1998)
  - Total: 22,151
- Time zone: UTC+1 (CET)

Ghriss (Arabic: غريس) is a town and commune in Mascara Province, Algeria. According to the 1998 census it has a population of 22,151.

It is located 18 kilometres (11 mi) from Mascara and 120 kilometres (75 mi) from Oran, rising to around 500 metres (1,600 ft) in the Ghriss plain. Its name is derived from Aghris (Berber languages: ⴰⵖⵔⵉⵙ) meaning "white frost". During the French colonial period, the town was named "Thiersville" after Adolphe Thiers, and its nearby airport Ghriss Airport was called "Thiersville Airfield" during WWII.

== Famous People ==
Zahia Dehar, 1992, fashion model
