= 60th Operations Group =

Unit of the US Air Force, part of the 60th Air Mobility Wing

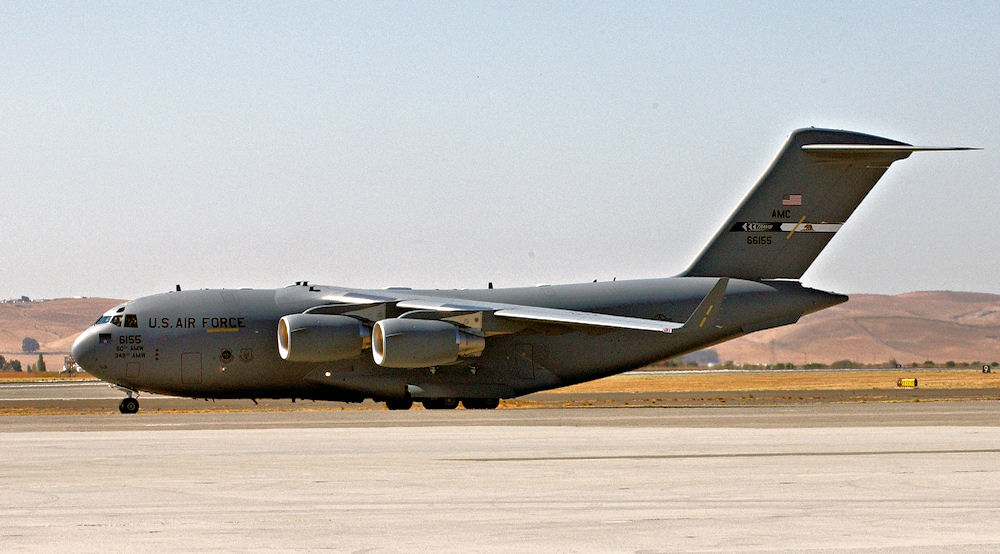
- Boeing C-17A Globemaster III 06-6155 of the 21st Airlift Squadron
- Active: 1940–1946; 1948–1957; 1978–1979; 1991–present
- Country: United States
- Branch: United States Air Force
- Type: Strategic Airlift
- Garrison/HQ: Travis Air Force Base, California
- Engagements: European-African-Middle East Campaign (World War II) Berlin Airlift Kosovo Campaign

- Decorations: Distinguished Unit Citation Meritorious Unit Award Air Force Outstanding Unit Award (11x)

Insignia
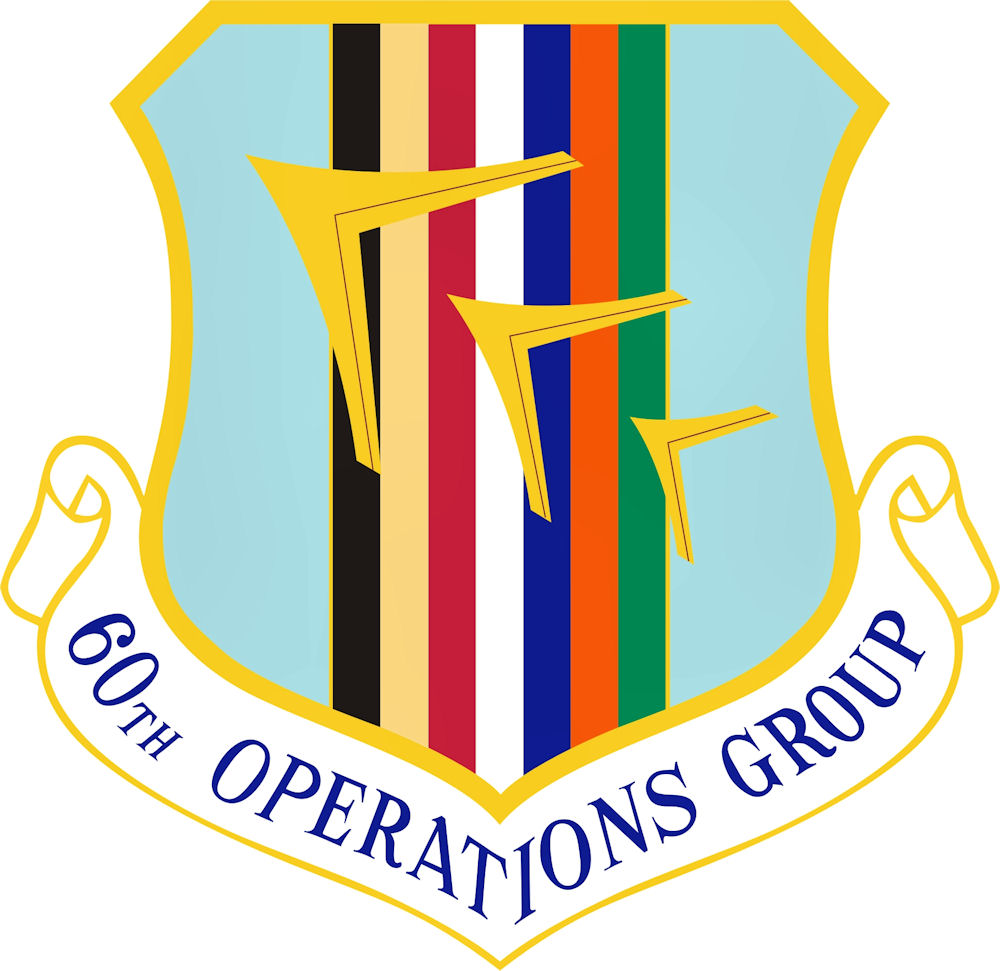
- 60th Operations Group Emblem

Aircraft flown
- Transport: C-17A Globemaster III; C-5M Super Galaxy
- Tanker: KC-46A Pegasus

The 60th Operations Group (60 OG) is a United States Air Force unit assigned to the 60th Air Mobility Wing. It is stationed at Travis Air Force Base, California.

Established prior to World War II, its predecessor unit, the 60th Transport (later Troop Carrier) Group engaged in combat operations, first with the Eighth Air Force and primarily with Twelfth Air Force during the war. It received a Distinguished Unit Citation for its actions in the Mediterranean Theater of Operations, 28 March-15 September 1944. While attempting to organize effective fighting forces in Yugoslavia, Greece, and Albania, the Allies tasked the 60th for an immediate, substantial, and steady flow of desperately needed supplies. Despite poor weather, terrain, enemy night fighters, anti-aircraft fire, and hostile ground action, the 60th flew nearly 3,000 missions, including 600 hazardous landings, delivered more than 7,000 tons of supplies and equipment, and evacuated thousands of military and civilian personnel. The group lost 10 aircraft and 34 members of the 60th were either killed or listed as missing.

== Overview ==
The 60th Operations Group is the flying component of the Air Mobility Command 60th Air Mobility Wing. The 60 OG is the largest Operations Group in Air Mobility Command. It operates and maintains C-5 Galaxy; C-17 Globemaster III transports and KC-10 Extender air refueling aircraft supporting global engagement of troops, supplies, and equipment.

== Components ==
The 60 OG consists of the following squadrons:

- 60th Operations Support Squadron
- 6th Air Refueling Squadron – (KC-46A Pegasus)
- 9th Air Refueling Squadron – (KC-46A Pegasus)
- 21st Airlift Squadron – (C-17A Globemaster III)
- 22d Airlift Squadron – (C-5M Super Galaxy)

== History ==
For additional history and lineage, see 60th Air Mobility Wing

=== World War II ===
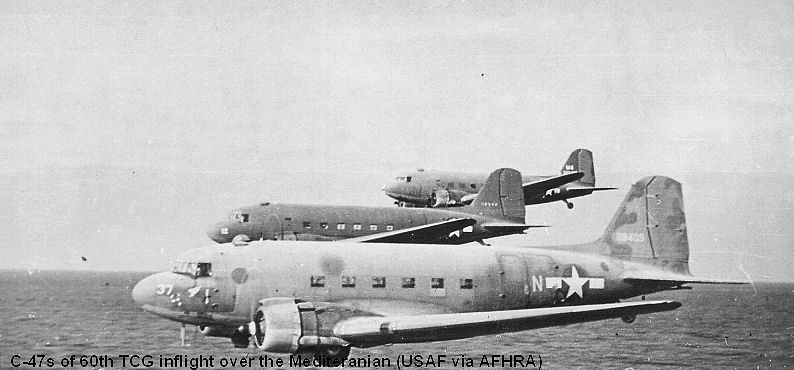
C-47 Skytrains of the 60th Troop Carrier Group during World War II

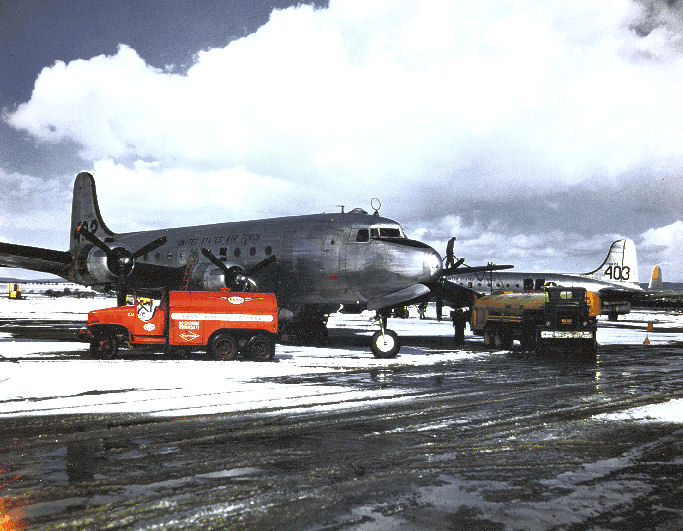
60th TCG C-54 Skymasters during the Berlin Airlift

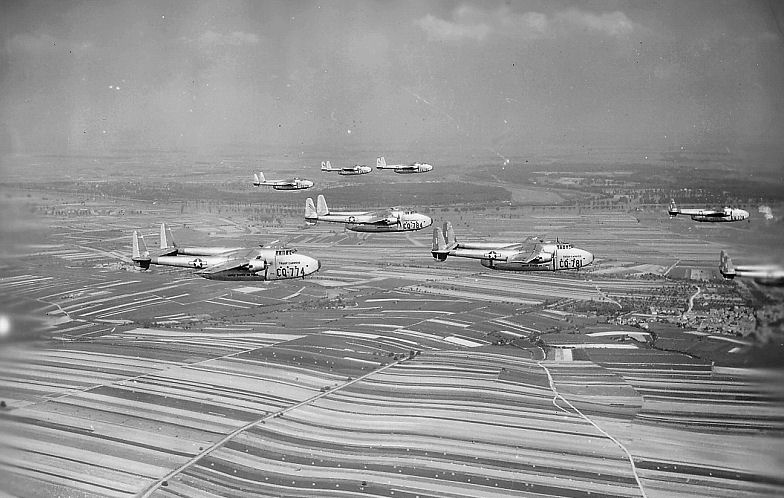
Squadron of 60th TCG C-82 Packets over Europe, 1952

Constituted on 20 November 1940 as the 60th Transport Group, the unit activated at Olmsted Field, Pennsylvania, on 1 December 1940, flying the C-47 aircraft. After a brief stay at Westover Field, Massachusetts (May 1941 – June 1942), the 60th moved to Chelveston, England, and then to Aldermaston, England, in August 1942. The group was redesignated as the 60th Troop Carrier Group on 1 July 1942.

The units next moved to Tafaraoui Airfield, Algeria, and was assigned to Twelfth Air Force. During the war in Europe, the 60 TCG also served from bases in Tunisia, Sicily, and Italy before moving to Waller Field, Trinidad, in June 1945. During World War II, the group participated in the battle for Tunisia; towed gliders and dropped paratroops behind enemy lines when the Allies invaded Sicily; and dropped paratroops at Megara during the airborne element of the liberation of Greece in October 1944. When not engaged in airborne operations, the group transported troops and supplies and evacuated wounded personnel. In October 1943, for instance, the 60th dropped supplies to men who had escaped from prisoner-of-war camps.

Received a DUC for supporting partisans in the Balkans, March–September 1944, making unarmed night missions to provisional airfields in Yugoslavia, Albania, and Greece. On return flights evacuated wounded partisans and escaped Allied personnel.

In June 1945, the 60 TCG moved to Trinidad and came under the command of the Air Transport Command. The group inactivated on 31 July 1945.

=== Cold War ===
After just 15 months on the inactive list, the 60th activated again on 30 September 1946, this time at Munich, Germany. Shortly after moving to Kaufbeuren Air Base, Germany, on 14 May 1948, the 60 TCG and its three squadrons—the 10th, 11th, and 12th Troop Carriers Squadrons—began supporting the Berlin Airlift. From 26 June 1948 to 30 September 1949, the C-47 and C-54-equipped squadrons flew from both Kaufbeuren AB and Wiesbaden AB, Germany, and contributed to the U.S. total of nearly 1.8 million tons of supplies delivered on 189,963 flights.

During the Berlin Airlift, the 60th Troop Carrier Wing, Medium, activated at Kaufbeuren AB on 1 July 1948. At that time the 60 TCG became a subordinate unit assigned to the new wing. Through its subordinate operations group—the 60th Troop Carrier Group, Heavy—the 60 TCW managed three flying squadrons: the 10th, 11th, and 12th Troop Carrier Squadrons.

When the Berlin Airlift ended on 26 September 1949, the 60 TCG began moving without its personnel and equipment to Wiesbaden AB, West Germany, where the wing assumed the resources of the inactivated 7150th Air Force Composite Wing. The 60th became operational at Wiesbaden on 1 October 1949. On 2 June 1951, the wing replaced the 61 TCW at Rhein-Main AB, where the 60 TCG had been stationed on detached service. At this time, the group resumed a tactical role and assumed responsibility for controlling all U.S. tactical airlift resources in Europe. The 60 TCG provided logistic airlift services to U.S. and Allied forces in Europe while maintaining host unit responsibilities at Rhein-Main. Operating the C-82, C-119, and C-47 aircraft, the wing participated in countless exercises and provided air transportability training to U.S. Army units.

In a major reorganization, the 322 AD reduced the headquarters elements of the 60 TCG, 309 TCG, and the 60 M & S Group to one officer and one airmen each on 15 November 1956. Was inactivated in 1957.

Briefly activated as the 60 Military Airlift Group in March 1978. Until February 979, airlifted personnel and cargo worldwide, controlling the 60 MAW's tactical squadrons. Participated in joint exercises and humanitarian airlift missions, including airlift following the Jonestown, Guyana murder-suicides, November 1978.

=== Modern era ===
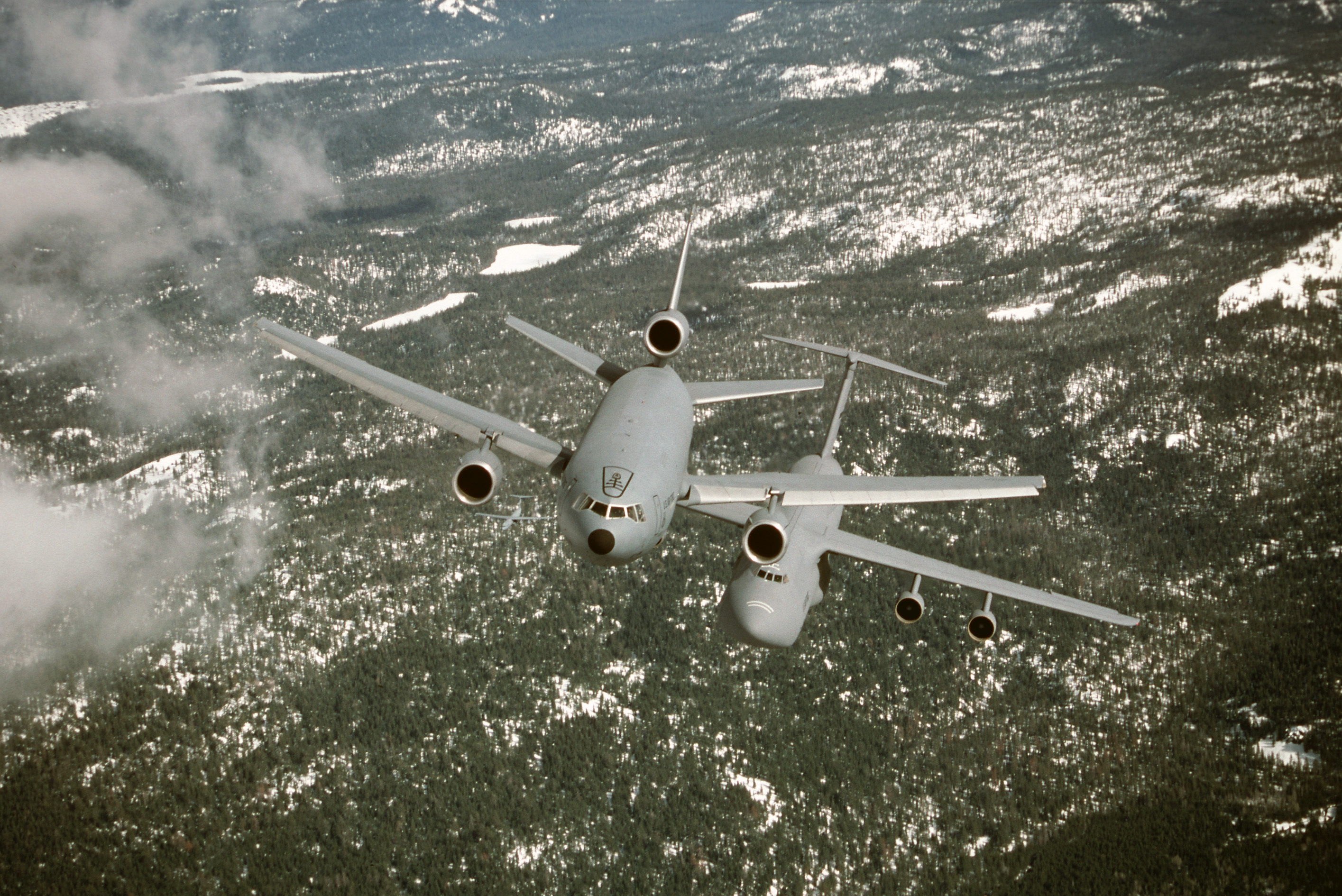
KC-10 refueling a C-5 Galaxy

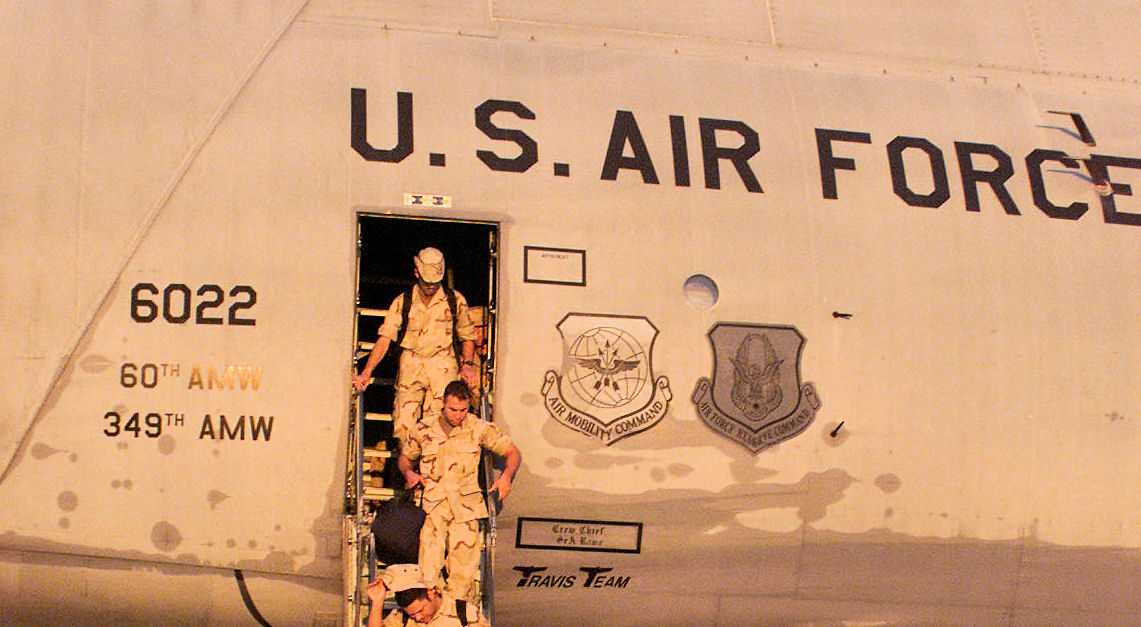
Personnel from the 366th Air Expeditionary Wing arriving in Lockheed C-5B Galaxy in support of the U.S. Central Command execution of Operation Enduring Freedom.

On 28 October 1991, the 60th Operations Group activated under the "Objective Wing" concept adapted by the Air Force as the lines between tactical and strategic forces blurred. The flying components of the 60th Airlift Wing were reassigned to the newly established group. Upon activation, the 60 OG was bestowed the history, lineage and honors of the 60 Military Airlift Group and its predecessor units from the wing.

In 1991, commenced airlift in support of U.S. relief operations in Somalia during Operations PROVIDE RELIEF and RESTORE HOPE. Supported on-going operations in Southwest Asia during Operation SOUTHERN WATCH. Group elements also supported Operation PROVIDE COMFORT that provided relief for Kurdish refugees, assisted in the evacuation of military personnel and their dependents from the Philippines through Operation FIERY VIGIL in 1991, and supplied airlift support to Balkans peacekeeping missions beginning in 1995 with Operation JOINT ENDEAVOR, and continuing under Operations JOINT GUARD and JOINT FORGE. Deployed tanker and support elements to the European theater during Operation ALLIED FORCE from March–June 1999, as well as providing airlift support to other air expeditionary forces deploying to the operation.

=== Global War on Terrorism ===
America began air strikes against the Taliban and Al Qaeda forces on 7 October 2001, but the groundwork for success was laid in the weeks leading up to those attacks. Under Operation Enduring Freedom, a rapid mobilization requiring a tremendous effort from the personnel, supply, medical, security forces, finance, legal and chapel specialists charged with ensuring airmen were ready, trained and equipped to deploy.

The 60th Air Expeditionary Group was designated as a provisional unit under Air Mobility Command to activate or inactivate as necessary for combat operations of the 60th Operations Group. The military build-up at bare base locations on the other side of the globe put the strategic airlift capabilities of the Travis C-5 fleet to the test. In support of one forward operating location alone, Travis C-5s helped deliver more than 8 million tons of cargo and 2,500 passengers in the months of September and October.

When the bombers did launch 7 October, they reached their distant targets in Afghanistan only with the help of aerial refueling from Travis KC-10s of the 60th Air Expeditionary Group. Base tankers have kept up support of the air campaign from two major locations, offloading more than 120 million pounds of fuel to combat aircraft during the height of military operations. Travis KC-10s flew a year's worth of flying hours in less than six months since 11 September. Over 90 percent of these flying hours were flown in combat or in combat support.

In February 2002 C-17 Globemaster IIIs joined the 60th Air Expeditionary Group to carry warfighters and equipment into Afghanistan in support of Operation Enduring Freedom. When U.S. Central Command officials decided to put ground troops in Afghanistan, they called on the 101st Airborne Division from Fort Campbell, Ky. To get the soldiers to the fight, Air Mobility Command used C-17s and C-5 Galaxy airlifters to move the Army's air assault division into Afghanistan.

=== Lineage ===
- Established as 60th Transport Group on 20 November 1940

Activated on 1 December 1940
Re-designated 60th Troop Carrier Group on 7 July 1942
Inactivated on 31 July 1945

- Activated on 30 September 1946

Re-designated: 60th Troop Carrier Group, Medium, on 1 July 1948
Re-designated: 60th Troop Carrier Group, Heavy, on 5 November 1948
Re-designated: 60th Troop Carrier Group, Medium, on 16 November 1949
Inactivated on 12 March 1957

- Re-designated 60th Military Airlift Group, and activated, on 6 March 1978

Inactivated on 15 February 1979

- Re-designated 60th Operations Group on 28 October 1991

Activated on 1 November 1991

- Designated 60th Air Expeditionary Group in September 2001 when group elements deployed to combat areas.

=== Assignments ===
- III Corps Area, 1 December 1940
- 50th Transport Wing, 31 March 1942
- 51st Transport (later, 51st Troop Carrier) Wing, 1 June 1942
- Eighth Air Force, 19 June 1942
- Twelfth Air Force, 14 September 1942
- 51st Troop Carrier Wing, 20 February 1944

Attached to No. 334 Wing RAF, Balkan Air Force, March–September 1944

- Air Transport Command, 26 May – 31 July 1945
- 51st Troop Carrier Wing, 30 September 1946
- 60th Troop Carrier Wing, Medium (later, 60th Troop Carrier Wing, Heavy; 60th Troop Carrier Wing, Medium), 1 July 1948 – 12 March 1957

Attached to: 7320th Air Force Wing, 16–19 January 1949
Attached to: 1st Air Lift Task Force, 20 January-26 September 1949

- 60th Military Airlift Wing, 6 March 1978 – 15 February 1979
- 60th Airlift Wing (later, 60th Air Mobility Wing), 1 November 1991–present

=== Components ===
World War II

- 10th Transport (later, Troop Carrier) Squadron (S6): 1 December 1940 – 31 July 1945; 30 September 1946 – 12 March 1957
- 11th Transport (later, Troop Carrier) Squadron (7D): 1 December 1940 – 31 July 1945; 30 September 1946 – 12 March 1957
- 12th Transport (later, Troop Carrier) Squadron (U5): 1 December 1940 – 31 July 1945; 30 September 1946 – 12 March 1957
- 28th Transport (later, Troop Carrier) Squadron (3D): 20 April 1942 – 31 July 1945

Cold War

- 7th Military Airlift (later Airlift) Squadron: 6 March 1978 – 15 February 1979; 1 November 1991 – 1 October 1993
- 22d Military Airlift (later, Airlift) Squadron: 6 March 1978 – 15 February 1979; 1 November 1991–present
- 75th Military Airlift (later Airlift) Squadron: 6 March 1978 – 15 February 1979; 1 November 1991 – 1 October 1993
- 86th Military Airlift (later, Airlift) Squadron: 6 March 1978 – 15 February 1979; 1 November 1991 – 1 October 1993.

Modern era

- 6th Air Refueling Squadron: 1 August 1995–present
- 9th Air Refueling Squadron: 1 September 1994–present
- 19th Airlift Squadron: 1 October 1993 – 30 September 1996
- 20th Airlift Squadron: 1 October 1993 – 31 December 1997
- 21st Airlift Squadron: 1 October 1993–present
- 55th Weather Reconnaissance Squadron: 1 February-1 October 1993

=== Stations ===
- Olmsted Field, Pennsylvania, 1 December 1940
- Westover Field, Massachusetts, 21 May 1941 – 20 May 1942
- RAF Chelveston (AAF-105), England, 12 June 1942
- RAF Aldermaston (AAF-467), England, 7 August-7 November 1942
- Relizane Airfield, Algeria, 8 November 1942
- Thiersville Airfield, Algeria, 11 May 1943
- El Djem Airfield, Tunisia, 30 June 1943
- Ponte Olivo Airfield, Sicily, 31 August 1943
- Gerbini Airfield, Sicily, 29 October 1943
- Brindisi Airfield, Italy, 26 March 1944
- Pomigliano Airfield, Italy, 8 October 1944 – 23 May 1945
- Waller Field, Trinidad, 4 June – 31 July 1945
- Munich AFB, Germany, 30 September 1946
- Kaufbeuren AFB (later, Kaufbeuren AB), Germany, 14 May 1948
- Wiesbaden AB, Germany, 10 August 1948
- Kaufbeuren AB, Germany, 18 October 1948
- Wiesbaden AB, Germany, 15 December 1948
- Rhein-Main AB, Germany (later West Germany), 26 September 1949
- Dreux AB, France, 23 September 1955 – 12 March 1957
- Travis AFB, California, 6 March 1978 – 15 February 1979; November 1991–present

=== Aircraft ===
- C-52 Skytrain, 1941–1942
- C-47 Skytrain, 1942–1945, 1946–1948
- C-54 Skymaster, 1948–1949
- C-82 Packet, 1949–1953
- C-119 Flying Boxcar, 1953–1957
- C-141 Starlifter, 1978–1979, 1991–1997
- C-5 Galaxy, 1978–1979, 1991–present
- WC-135 Stratolifter, 1993
- KC-10 Extender, 1994–2023
- C-17 Globemaster III, 2006–present
- KC-46A Pegasus, 2023-present
