= 9th Air Refueling Squadron =

US Air Force unit

9th Air Refueling Squadron

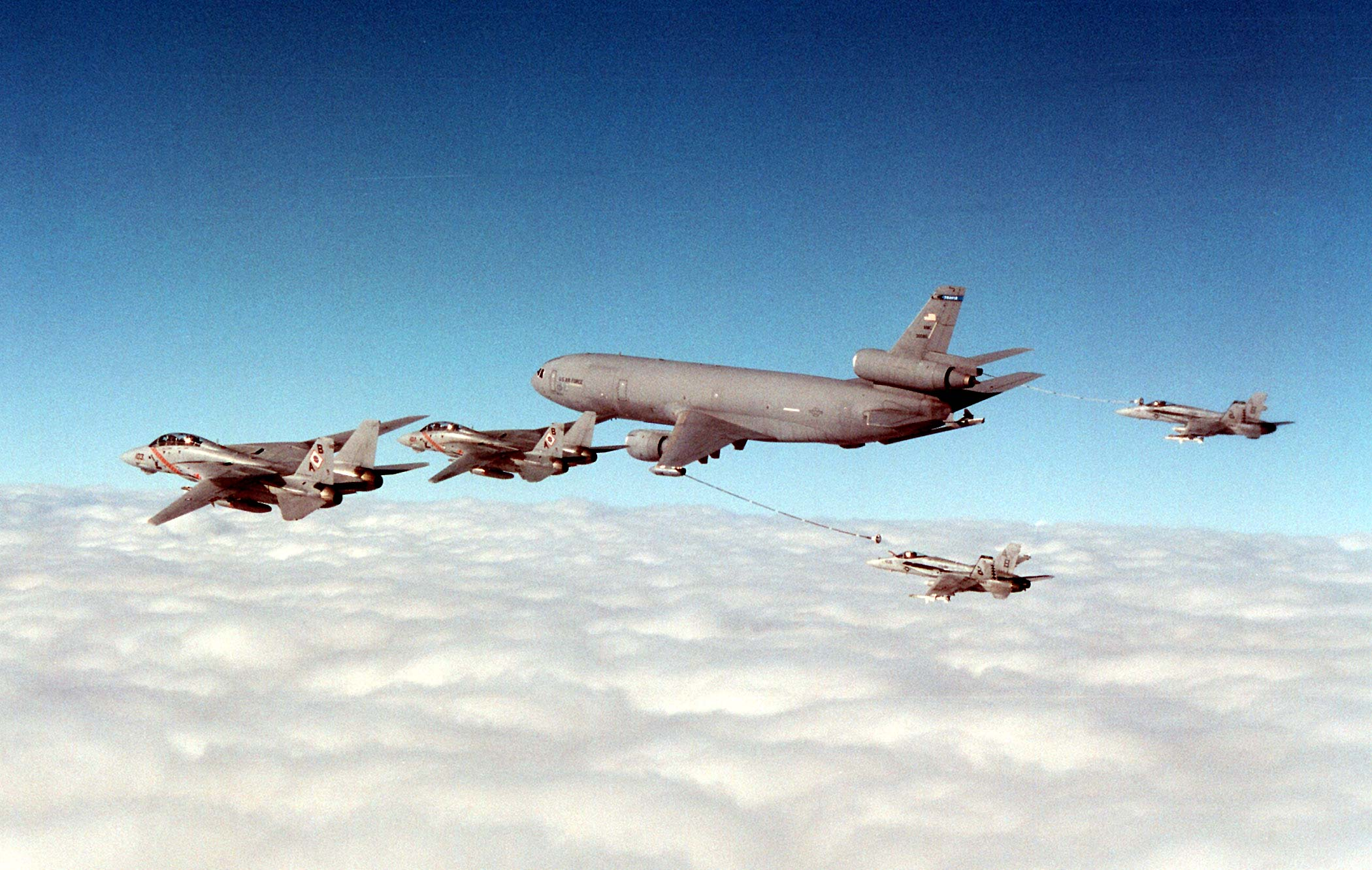
- A Travis KC-10 Extender refuels Navy fighters during a deployment
- Active: 1942–1945; 1951–1965; 1969–1982; 1982–present
- Country: United States
- Branch: United States Air Force
- Role: Aerial refueling
- Size: over 150 personnel
- Part of: Air Mobility Command
- Garrison/HQ: Travis Air Force Base
- Motto: Universal
- Engagements: Southwest Pacific Theater; China-Burma-India Theater; War in Kosovo
- Decorations: Air Force Meritorious Unit Award; Air Force Outstanding Unit Award

Commanders
- Current Commander: Lieutenant Colonel Andrew Baer
- Current Operations Officer: Lt Col(sel) Barrett Meysembourg
- First Sergeant: MSgt Angelica Asaeli
- Current Squadron Superintendent: CMSgt Gerald James
- Notable commanders: General Arthur J. Lichte; General Paul Selva; Lieutenant General Michelle D. Johnson

Insignia
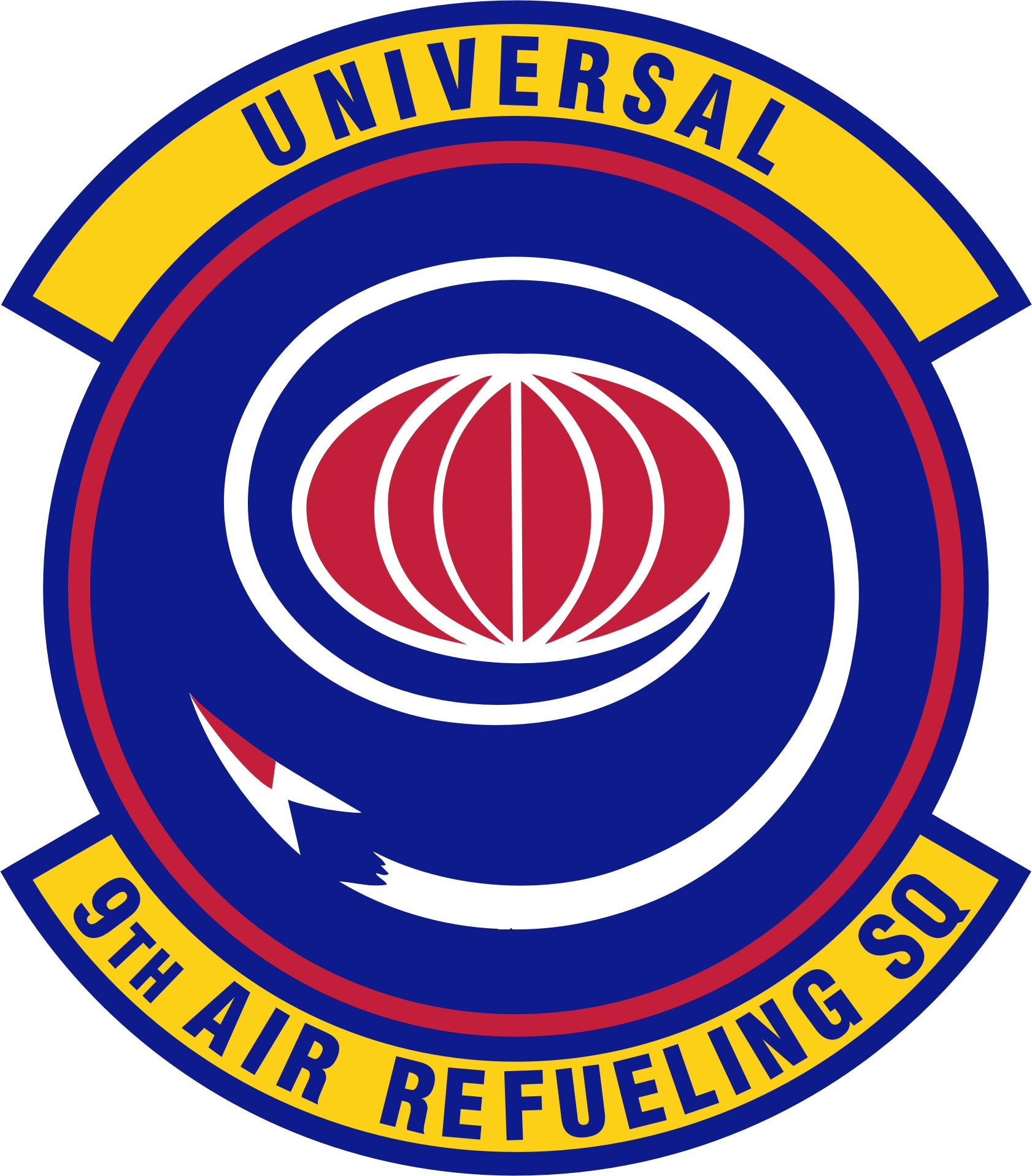
- 9th Air Refueling Squadron emblem (Note: Approved 19 July 1971. Description: On a Blue disc edged with a narrow Blue border fimbriated Red, a Red elliptical globe, rimmed and grid lined White. Issuing from the rim in sinister and arced to form the figure 9, a spiralling White contrail terminating below a Red and White ascending flight symbol. From January 1970 until this emblem was approved, the squadron used the emblem of the 903d Air Refueling Squadron, which it had replaced at Beale AFB.)

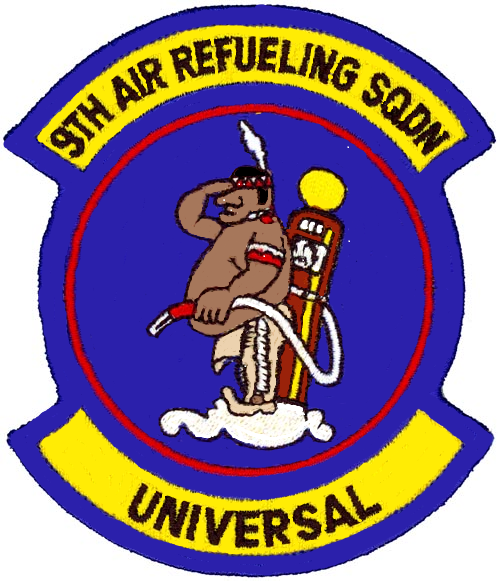
- 9th Air Refueling Squadron emblem (Note: Approved 2 December 1954.)

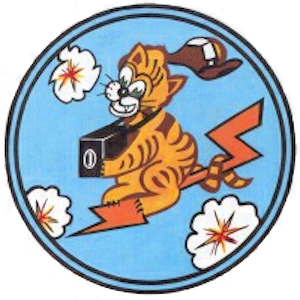
- unofficial 9th Photographic Reconnaissance Squadron emblem (World War II)

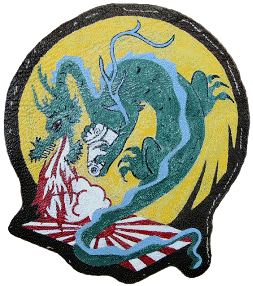
- unofficial 9th Photographic Squadron emblem (early World War II) (Note: This emblem was designed for the squadron by Disney Studios, but not officially approved before the squadron moved overseas. The complexity of the emblem made it difficult to reproduce overseas and it was replaced by the tiger cub emblem, which did not receive official endorsement, either.)

Aircraft flown
- Tanker: KC-10 Extender

The 9th Air Refueling Squadron is an active United States Air Force unit, stationed at Travis Air Force Base, California, where it operates the McDonnell Douglas KC-10 Extender as part of the 60th Operations Group.

The squadron was first active during World War II as the 9th Photographic Reconnaissance Squadron, serving in combat the China-Burma-India Theater from 1942 through 1945, primarily with Lockheed F-4 and F-5 Lightning reconnaissance aircraft.

The 9th Air Refueling Squadron was activated in 1951, and has operated the Boeing KB-29 Superfortress, Boeing KC-97, and Boeing KC-135 Stratotanker, prior to its current air refueling equipment. It has been deployed worldwide, assisting in wartime, humanitarian, and peacekeeping efforts in often remote areas.

== Mission ==
The 9th Air Refueling Squadron mobilizes and deploys twelve KC-10 aircraft and over 140 personnel and equipment to worldwide forward operating locations. It generates 24-hour-a-day strategic airlift and air refueling sorties supporting U.S. and allied forces during contingency operations. It trains aircrews to support and sustain Joint Chiefs of Staff directed missions. The 9th executes an 8,000+ flying hour program and a $580,000 budget.

== History ==
=== World War II ===
==== Training in the United States ====
The first predecessor of the squadron was organized in February 1942 at Mitchell Field, New York, as the 9th Photographic Squadron and was assigned directly to First Air Force. The unit began an intensive period of training for early deployment overseas with Lockheed F-4 Lightning aircraft. By March, its destination had been settled as the China-Burma-India Theater of Operations and it was assigned to Tenth Air Force, which was moving to that theater. The support elements of the squadron departed from the Charleston, South Carolina Port of Embarkation on the SS Mariposa in May.

The squadron's aircrews remained behind to receive additional training at Peterson Field. After The squadron's Lightnings went through modifications at Dallas, Texas, they were delivered to Newark Army Air Base, New Jersey for shipment to India. The pilots then boarded transport planes for flight to India.

==== Combat in China, Burma and India ====
The squadron did not arrive in India until late July, by which time it had been renamed the 9th Photographic Reconnaissance Squadron. Despite the haste with which it had been sent to Karachi, India and its long ocean voyage, it was an even longer voyage for its F-4 Lightnings, which only began to arrive in September. In the interim, the squadron's mechanics helped assemble Republic P-43 Lancer and Vultee P-66 Vanguard fighters for delivery to the Nationalist Chinese Air Force. However, this early in the war, techniques for sea transport of aircraft had not been developed and many of the squadron's aircraft had been damaged in preparing them for shipment. In particular, fuel tanks had not been fully drained causing severe deterioration of the self-sealing features, which resulted in the need for extensive work on the planes by the air depot at Agra.

In October, the squadron sent a detachment to Kunming Airport, China to build and operate a photographic processing laboratory for the China Air Task Force. The detachment was augmented by four Lightnings in November. The same month, the squadron moved to Chakulia Airfield, India, which was already the home of the 7th Bombardment Group, with the idea that the squadron could work with the 7th Group to provide prestrike and poststrike reconnaissance. On 12 December, nearly five months after its official arrival in theater, the squadron flew its first combat reconnaissance mission over Burma. (Note: It is not clear whether the detachment with the China Air Task Force flew earlier combat missions in China.) Flights of squadron reconnaissance aircraft operated over a wide area of Burma, Thailand, and China until VJ Day, obtaining aerial photos and reconnaissance of enemy positions and targets for heavy bomber attacks in support of British and American forces.

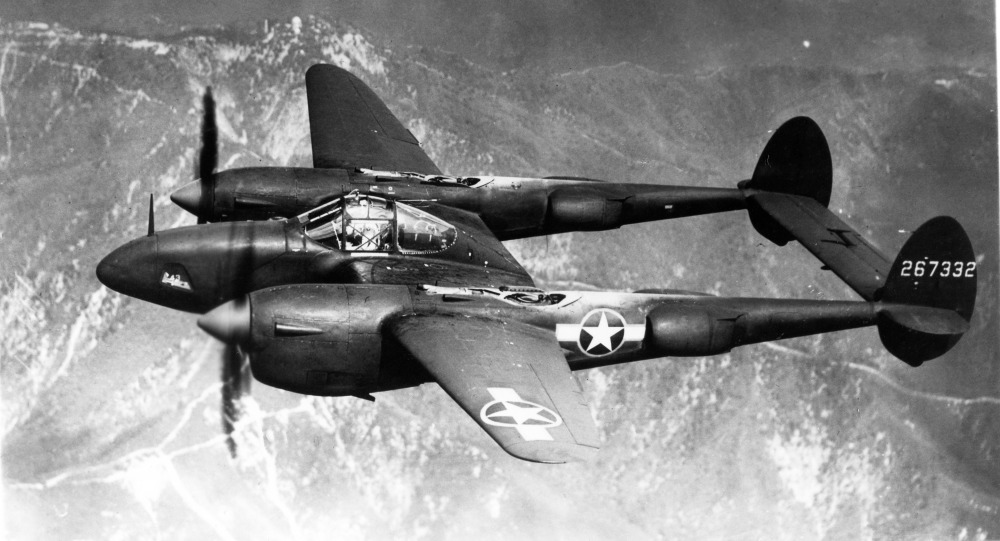
Lightning Lockheed F-5B as flown by the squadron

In March 1943, a single Lightning and supporting personnel and equipment were detached to Dinjan Airfield, India. Combat attrition had seriously reduced the availability of the squadron's F-4s by this time, and two months later, the squadron began to fly a second type of plane, the North American B-25 Mitchell. The first Mitchell, formerly flown by the 7th Bombardment Group, arrived on 27 May. After modifying the B-25s to carry cameras the squadron flew its first combat mission with the B-25 on 10 June. Meanwhile, the squadron had begun receiving the newer F-5 reconnaissance version of the Lightning, (Note: The F-5 had more powerful engines, longer range and better communications equipment.) and the first F-5 mission was flown later the same month. In July, the squadron transferred the personnel and equipment at its detachment at Kunming to the 21st Photographic Squadron, which had just arrived in the theater.

Tenth Air Force formed the provisional 5306th Photographic and Reconnaissance Group in October 1943 and attached the squadron to it. (Note: The other flying squadrons in the 5306th Group were the 20th Tactical Reconnaissance Squadron and the 24th Combat Mapping Squadron.) In December reconnaissance assets in India were centralized under Photo Reconnaissance Force, Eastern Air Command, a combined Army Air Forces and Royal Air Force headquarters. The provisional group was discontinued on 17 January 1944 and its components, including the 9th, returned to the control of Tenth Air Force.

In April 1944, the 8th Photographic Group arrived in theater and the squadron was assigned to it. Next month, the 20th Tactical Reconnaissance Squadron took over the reconnaissance mission at Dinjan, which the 9th had maintained since March 1943 with a brief pause, and squadron assets at Dinjan rejoined the squadron at Barrackpore Airfield. However the squadron maintained detachments at other locations in India and Burma, including Tingkawk Sakan Airfield, Myitkyina Airfield and Chittagong Airport. The Chittagong detachment augmented No. 224 Group RAF. Responsibility for this augmentation began to be transferred to the 40th Photographic Reconnaissance Squadron in November, and all 9th Squadron personnel had been withdrawn by the middle of December.

The squadron remained in India after the Japanese surrender, but left for the United States in mid-November 1945 aboard the USS General M. C. Meigs. Upon its arrival at the port of embarkation in the United States in December 1945, it was inactivated.

=== Strategic Air Command ===
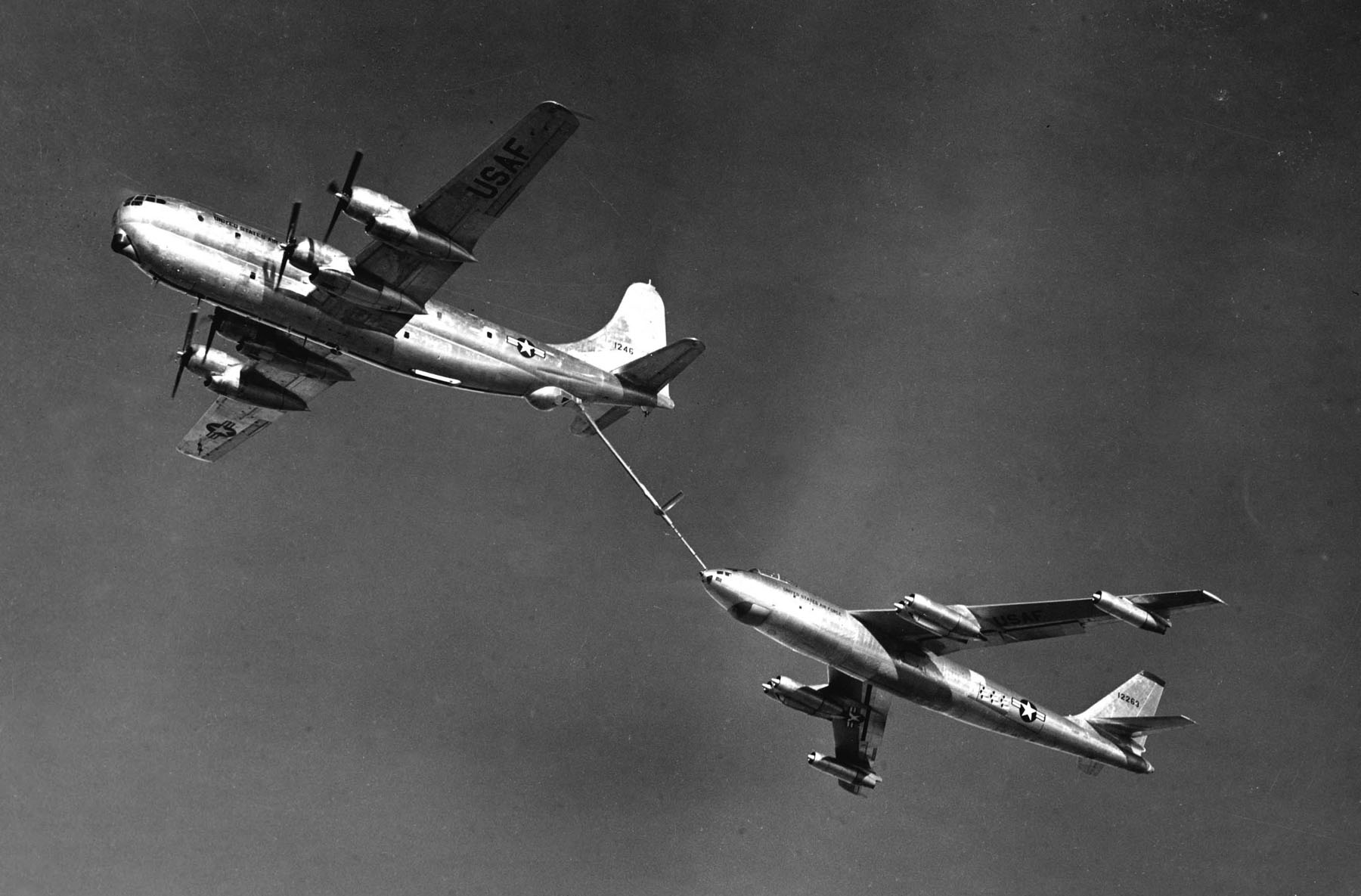
KC-97 refueling a B-47

The 9th Air Refueling Squadron was activated on 1 August 1951 at Davis-Monthan Air Force Base, Arizona and equipped with Boeing KB-29M Superfortress aircraft. It was assigned to the 9th Bombardment Group until June 1952, then to the 9th Bombardment Wing. These headquarters were located at Travis Air Force Base, California, so the squadron was attached to various units at Davis-Monthan, while it trained on air refueling techniques. In 1953, the wing and squadron were finally united, when both moved to Mountain Home Air Force Base, Idaho. In July, the squadron became nonoperational while the wing was becoming a Boeing B-47 Stratojet unit. By early 1954, both the wing and squadron were again operational. By September 1954, the squadron had fully converted to the Boeing KC-97 Stratofreighter

From Mountain Home, the squadron deployed as a unit to Ben Guerir Air Base, French Morocco for three months in 1955 and later to Elmendorf Air Force Base, Alaska in 1956. It also deployed some of its personnel to Anderson Air Force Base, Guam. In 1965, as Strategic Air Command (SAC) began to phase its B-47s and KC-97s out of service, the squadron was inactivated and its planes transferred to storage, while its parent became the 9th Strategic Reconnaissance Wing and moved on paper to Beale Air Force Base, where it took over the resources of the 4200th Strategic Reconnaissance Wing, which was discontinued.

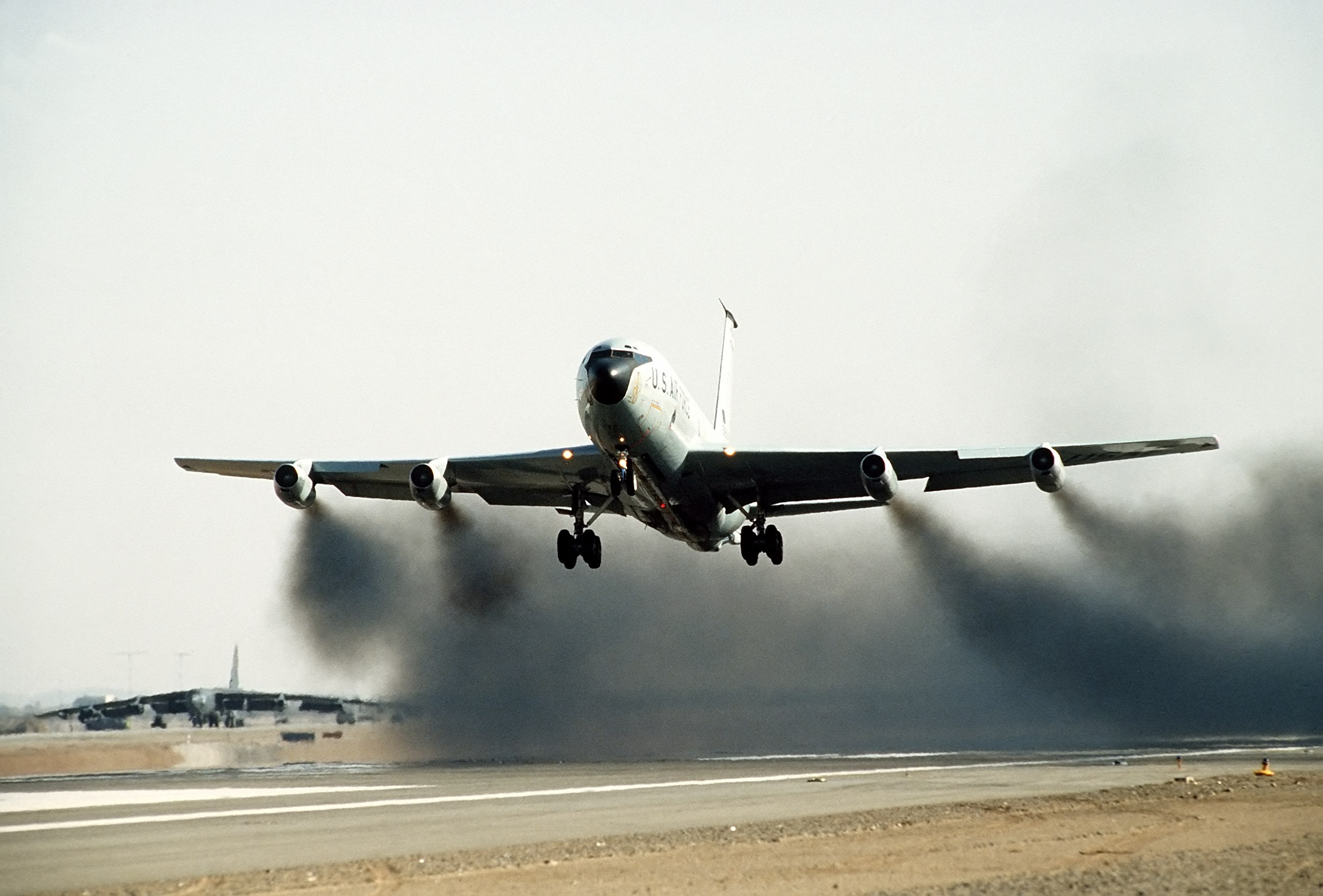
Boeing KC-135 taking off

The squadron was reactivated on 1 January 1970, when it joined the 9th Wing at Beale Air Force Base, as the 456th Strategic Aerospace Wing expanded to include two tanker squadrons to support its own Boeing B-52 Stratofortresses and the Lockheed SR-71 Blackbirds of the 9th Wing. At Beale, the 9th flew the Boeing KC-135 Stratotanker. Twelve years later, in January 1982, the squadron was again inactivated. Its planes and personnel were used to form the 350th Air Refueling Squadron, which was activated at Beale the next day.

The squadron began its current, and longest, active period a few months later, in August, at March Air Force Base, California, where it equipped with the McDonnell Douglas KC-10 Extender as part of the 22d Bombardment Wing. The following year, the squadron provided support for Operation Urgent Fury, the rescue of US students and replacement of the revolutionary government of Grenada with a constitutional one. On 19 September 1985, as part of a program to combine World War II combat units with those formed after the war, the 9th Air Refueling Squadron was consolidated with the 9th Photographic Reconnaissance Squadron.

In 1989, squadron assets assisted in Operation Just Cause, the 1989 incursion into Panama that ended Manuel Noriega's rule. The squadron supported deployments to Southwest Asia from 1990 to 1991 in Operations Desert Shield and Desert Storm. In September 1991, SAC implemented the Objective Wing organizational model and the squadron was transferred from the 22d Wing to its newly activated 22d Operations Group.

=== Air Mobility Command ===
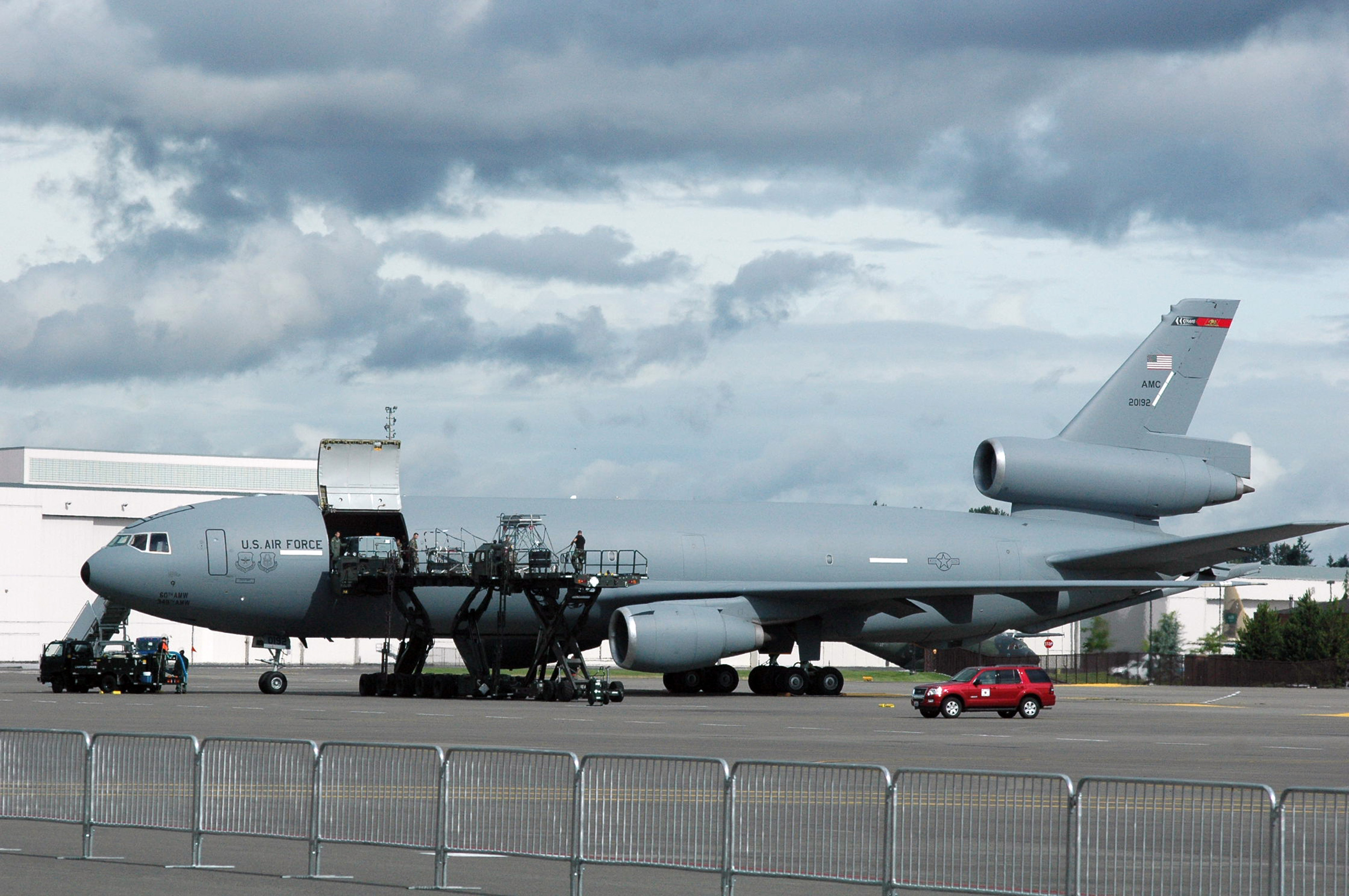
60th Wing KC-10A Extender at McChord AFB

In 1992, the Air Force reorganized its major commands, combining air refueling and airlift units under Air Mobility Command (AMC), with the 22d Air Refueling Wing becoming an element of the new command. Under AMC, the squadron flew humanitarian airlift missions to Somalia in support of Operation Restore Hope during 1992–1993. The 1991 Base Realignment and Closure Commission, meanwhile, recommended that March be transferred to Air Force Reserve Command. As the transfer of the base to the reserves was implemented, the 22d Air Refueling Wing moved without personnel or equipment to McConnell Air Force Base, Kansas, where it became a KC-135R wing. The 722d Air Refueling Wing was activated at March as a holding organization for the remaining regular Air Force units there on 1 January 1994, and the squadron became part of the 722d Wing until September 1994, when it moved to Travis Air Force Base, California and was assigned to the 60th Operations Group.

Although not deployed as a unit, crews and planes from the 9th supported Operation Southern Watch, enforcement of the no fly zone in southern Iraq through the 1990s by refueling marine aircraft deploying to Aviano Air Base, Italy. Its crews provided refueling for B-52s participating in Operation Desert Strike, cruise missile attacks on Iraqi forces in northern Iraq in September 1996 and Operation Desert Fox, later attacks on suspected Iraqi weapons sites. That same year, after terrorists sponsored by Libya struck a nightclub in Berlin, its crews supported Operation El Dorado Canyon, the retaliatory bombing of Libya. It aided Operation Allied Force, the NATO operation against Serbia in Kosovo in 1999 and Operation Deny Flight, enforcement of a no fly zone over Bosnia Herzegovina. It has provided airlift and refueling support for presidential travel.

In 1997, the 9th orchestrated the first sixteen-ship mixed-cell refueling formation in AMC history for Operation Centraz Bat, the longest airdrop mission in aviation history, in which eight Boeing C-17 Globemaster IIIs delivered 540 paratroopers and their supporting equipment over nearly 8,000 miles. Following the events of 9/11, the 9th supported Operation Noble Eagle. Starting in October 2001 and continuing to the present day, the unit has provided logistics support of Operation Enduring Freedom and undertaken support in Operation Iraqi Freedom of 2003. In 2015, the squadron's boom operators were awarded the Albert Evans Trophy as the best refueling section in the USAF.

== Lineage ==
9th Photographic Reconnaissance Squadron

- Constituted as the 9th Photographic Squadron on 19 January 1942

Activated on 1 February 1942
Redesignated 9th Photographic Reconnaissance Squadron on 9 June 1942
Redesignated 9th Photographic Squadron (Light) on 6 February 1943
Redesignated 9th Photographic Reconnaissance Squadron on 13 November 1943
Inactivated on 4 December 1945
Consolidated with the 9th Air Refueling Squadron as the 9th Air Refueling Squadron on 19 September 1985

9th Air Refueling Squadron

- Constituted as the 9th Air Refueling Squadron, Medium on 24 July 1951

Activated on 1 August 1951
Discontinued and inactivated on 15 December 1965

- Redesignated 9th Air Refueling Squadron, Heavy on 12 December 1969

Activated on 1 January 1970
Inactivated on 27 January 1982

- Activated on 1 August 1982
- Consolidated with the 9th Photographic Reconnaissance Squadron on 19 September 1985

Redesignated 9th Air Refueling Squadron on 1 September 1991

=== Assignments ===
- First Air Force, 1 February 1942
- Tenth Air Force, 29 March 1942 (flight attached to Fourteenth Air Force, 10 March – 12 July 1943)
- Army Air Forces, India-Burma Sector, 30 October 1943 (attached to 5306th Photographic and Reconnaissance Group (Provisional), 30 October 1943; Tenth Air Force after 17 January 1944)
- Tenth Air Force, 7 March 1944
- 8th Photographic Group (later 8th Reconnaissance Group), 25 April 1944
- Army Air Forces, India-Burma Theater, c. October–4 December 1945
- 9th Bombardment Group, 1 August 1951 (attached to 43d Bombardment Wing, 1 August 1951; 36th Air Division, 4 September 1951; 303d Bombardment Wing after 15 January 1952)
- 9th Bombardment Wing (later 9th Strategic Aerospace Wing), 16 June 1952 – 15 December 1965 (attached to 303d Bombardment Wing until 30 April 1953; 5th Air Division, 18 April – 16 July 1955; SAC Liaison Team, 2 May – 1 July 1956)
- 456th Strategic Aerospace Wing (later 456th Bombardment Wing), 1 January 1970
- 17th Bombardment Wing, 30 September 1975
- 100th Air Refueling Wing, 30 September 1976 – 27 January 1982
- 22d Bombardment Wing (later 22d Air Refueling Wing), 1 August 1982
- 22d Operations Group, 1 September 1991
- 722d Operations Group, 1 January 1994
- 60th Operations Group, 1 September 1994 – present

=== Stations ===
- Mitchel Field, New York, 1 February 1942
- Bradley Field, Connecticut, 10 March 1942
- Felts Field, Washington, 16 April – 18 May 1942
- Karachi Air Base, India, 24 July 1942

Flight at Kunming Airport, China, November 1942 – 12 July 1943
Detachment operated from Kweilin Airfield, China, c. February–12 July 1943

- Chakulia Airfield, India, 30 November 1942

Detachment operated from Dinjan Airfield, India, 18 March – July 1943

- Pandaveswar Airfield, India, 3 January 1943

Detachment operated from Dinjan Airfield, India, September 1943 – 20 May 1944

- Barrackpore Airfield, India, 29 October 1943

Detachment operated from Tingkawk Sakan Airfield, Burma, 16 August – 30 November 1944
Detachment operated from Myitkyina Airfield, Burma, 27 November–c. 5 December 1944
Detachment operated from Chittagong Airport, India, c. 9 October – 21 December 1944

- Myitkyina Airfield, Burma, c. 5 December 1944
- Piardoba Airfield, India, c. 1 May 1945
- Malir, India, c. October–c. 14 November 1945
- Camp Kilmer, New Jersey, 3–4 December 1945
- Davis-Monthan Air Force Base, Arizona, 1 August 1951
- Mountain Home Air Force Base, Idaho, 1 May 1953 – 15 December 1965

Deployed to Ben Guerir Air Base, French Morocco, 18 April – 16 July 1955; Elmendorf Air Force Base, Alaska, 2 May – 1 July 1956

- Beale Air Force Base, California, 1 January 1970 – 27 January 1982
- March Air Force Base, California, 1 August 1982
- Travis Air Force Base, California, 1 September 1994 – present

=== Aircraft ===
- Lockheed F-4 Lightning, 1942–1944
- Lockheed F-5 Lightning, 1943–1945
- North American B-25 Mitchell, 1943–1945
- Boeing KB-29 Superfortress, 1951–1954
- Boeing KC-97 Stratofreighter, 1954–1965
- Boeing KC-135 Stratotanker, 1970–1982
- McDonnell Douglas KC-10 Extender, 1982–2024

=== Awards and campaigns ===
Award streamer	Award	Dates	Notes
	Air Force Meritorious Unit Award	1 July 2005 – 30 June 2007	9th Air Refueling Squadron
	Air Force Outstanding Unit Award	1 January 1957 – 31 January 1958	9th Air Refueling Squadron
	Air Force Outstanding Unit Award	1 August 1982 – 30 June 1983	9th Air Refueling Squadron
	Air Force Outstanding Unit Award	1 July 1987 – 30 June 1989	9th Air Refueling Squadron
	Air Force Outstanding Unit Award	1 July 1989 – 30 June 1991	9th Air Refueling Squadron
	Air Force Outstanding Unit Award	1 July 1993 – 30 June 1995	9th Air Refueling Squadron
	Air Force Outstanding Unit Award	1 August 1995 – 30 July 1997	9th Air Refueling Squadron
	Air Force Outstanding Unit Award	1 July 1997 – 30 June 1999	9th Air Refueling Squadron
	Air Force Outstanding Unit Award	1 July 1999 – 30 June 2000	9th Air Refueling Squadron
	Air Force Outstanding Unit Award	1 July 2000 – 30 June 2001	9th Air Refueling Squadron
	Air Force Outstanding Unit Award	1 July 2001 – 30 June 2003	9th Air Refueling Squadron
	Air Force Outstanding Unit Award	1 July 2003 – 30 June 2004	9th Air Refueling Squadron
	Air Force Outstanding Unit Award	1 July 2004 – 30 July 2005	9th Air Refueling Squadron
	Air Force Outstanding Unit Award	1 July 2007 – 30 June 2009	9th Air Refueling Squadron
	Air Force Outstanding Unit Award	1 July 2009 – 30 June 2010	9th Air Refueling Squadron
	Air Force Outstanding Unit Award	1 July 2010 – 30 June 2012	9th Air Refueling Squadron
	Air Force Outstanding Unit Award	1 July 2012 – 30 June 2013	9th Air Refueling Squadron
	Air Force Outstanding Unit Award	1 July 2013 – 30 June 2014	9th Air Refueling Squadron
	Air Force Outstanding Unit Award	1 July 2014 – 30 June 2015	9th Air Refueling Squadron
	Air Force Outstanding Unit Award	1 July 2015 – 30 June 2016	9th Air Refueling Squadron
	Air Force Outstanding Unit Award	1 July 2017 – 30 June 2018	9th Air Refueling Squadron
	Air Force Outstanding Unit Award	1 July 2018 – 30 June 2020	9th Air Refueling Squadron

Campaign Streamer	Campaign	Dates	Notes
	Central Pacific	24 July 1942 – 6 December 1943	9th Photographic Reconnaissance Squadron
	China Defensive	24 July 1942 – 4 May 1945	9th Photographic Reconnaissance Squadron
	New Guinea	24 January 1943 – 31 December 1944	9th Photographic Reconnaissance Squadron
	India-Burma	2 April 1943 – 28 January 1945	9th Photographic Reconnaissance Squadron
	Central Burma	29 January 1945 – 15 July 1945	9th Photographic Reconnaissance Squadron
	Kosovo Air Campaign		9th Air Refueling Squadron

== See also ==
- List of United States Air Force air refueling squadrons
- List of B-29 Superfortress operators
- List of Lockheed P-38 Lightning operators
