= RAF Aldermaston =

Former Royal Air Force station in Berkshire, England

RAF Aldermaston USAAF Station 467
- Near Newbury, Berkshire in England
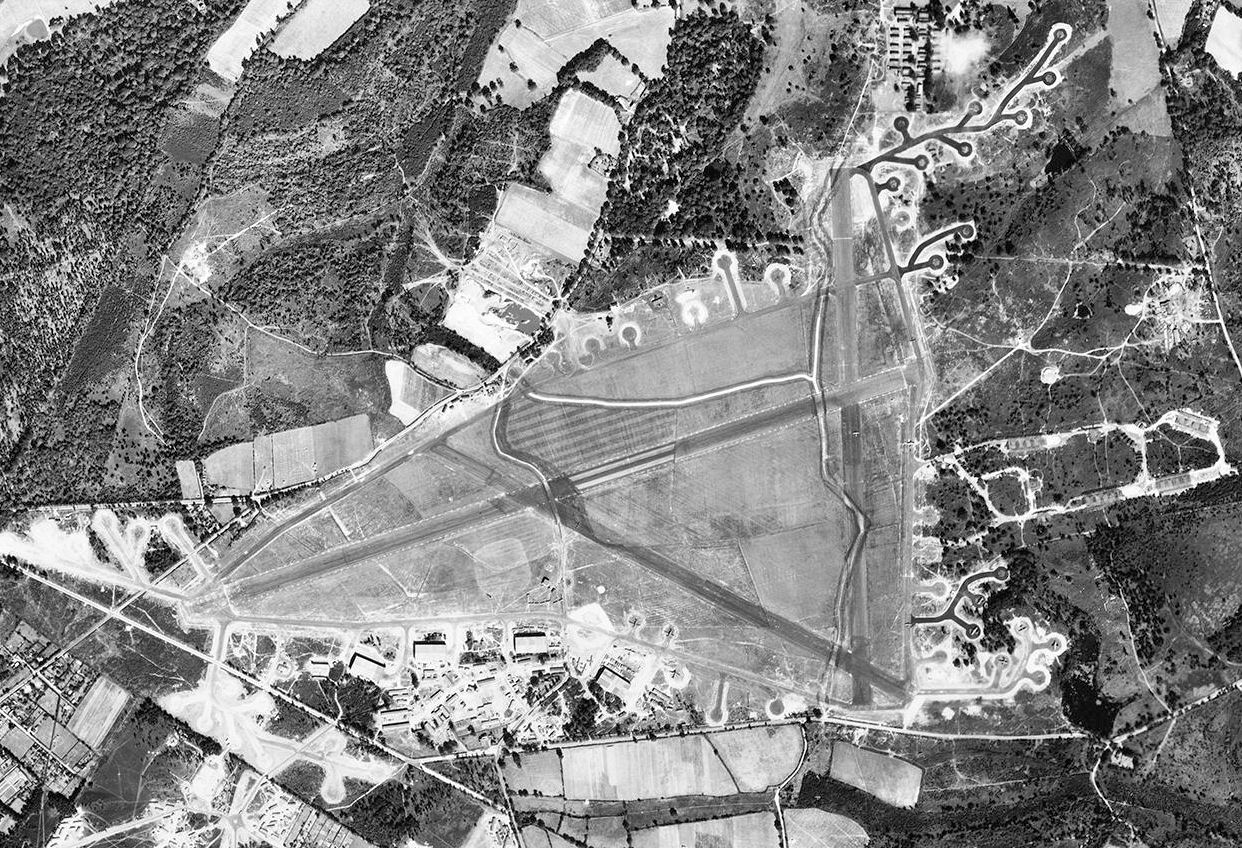
- Aerial photograph of RAF Aldermaston oriented north, taken 19 August 1943. The bomb dump is on the east side of the airfield

Site information
- Type: Royal Air Force station
- Code: AM
- Owner: Air Ministry
- Operator: Royal Air Force; United States Army Air Forces
- Controlled by: Eighth Air Force (1942-1943); Ninth Air Force (1943-1945); RAF Technical Training Command (1945)

Location
- Location in Berkshire RAF Aldermaston (the United Kingdom)
- Coordinates: 51°22′12″N 001°08′38″W

Site history
- Built: 1941-42
- In use: 1942-1945
- Battles/wars: European theatre of World War II: Operation Torch; Operation Overlord; Operation Market

Airfield information
- Elevation: 104 metres (341 ft) AMSL
Runways
Direction	Length and surface
05/23	1,830 metres (6,004 ft) Concrete
10/28	1,280 metres (4,199 ft) Concrete
16/34	1,280 metres (4,199 ft) Concrete

Royal Air Force Aldermaston, or more simply RAF Aldermaston, is a former Royal Air Force station located 8 miles (13 km) east of Newbury and 9.8 miles (15.8 km) southwest of Reading, in Berkshire, England.

Originally built as an RAF Bomber Command airfield during 1941-1942, Aldermaston was transferred to the United States Army Air Forces in August 1942. Placed under the jurisdiction of Eighth Air Force, it was home to several Douglas C-47 Skytrain Troop Carrier Groups. It was transferred to Ninth Air Force in 1943 primarily as a Troop Carrier Command base. Returned to RAF Control at the end of 1945, it was used by Technical Training Command before being placed on Care and Maintenance. In 1946, it was transferred to the Ministry of Civil Aviation and used by BOAC aircraft for training.

Also used by the Ministry of Aircraft Production for Supermarine Spitfire assembly and flight testing, the airfield closed in 1950 and the site became home of the Atomic Weapons Research Establishment (later the Atomic Weapons Establishment) from 1950.

== History ==
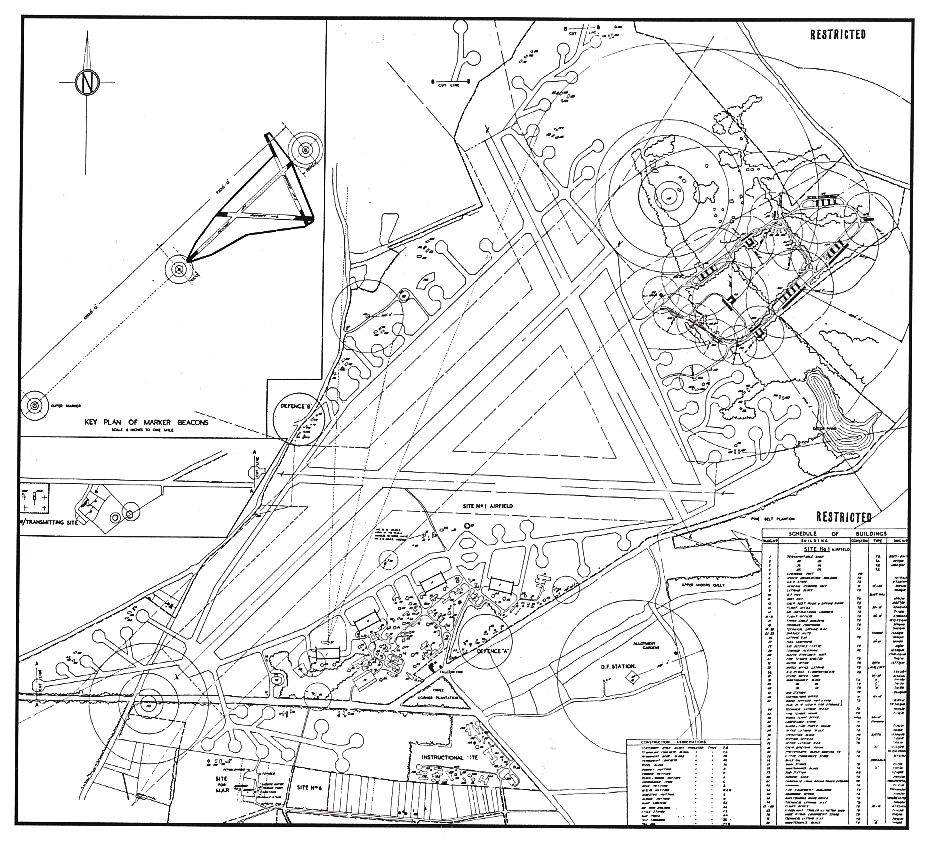
1945 Aldermaston site map

Aldermaston was initially planned as an RAF Bomber Command airfield, being constructed in 1941-1942. RAF 92 Group was programmed to occupy the facility with Vickers Wellington bombers. The facility was constructed as a "Class A" bomber airfield with three concrete runways. The main was 1,830m aligned 06/24, with two crosswind secondary runways of 1,280m aligned 11-29 and 17-35. The airfield had an encircling perimeter track with both the pan and loop-type aircraft hardstands for aircraft parking. The technical site was on the south side of the airfield, consisting of various administrative buildings, maintenance shops and four large T-2 hangars.

=== United States Army Air Forces use ===
However, to support the United States Army Air Forces (USAAF) Eighth Air Force in August 1942, jurisdiction of Aldermaston was transferred from RAF Bomber Command to the USAAF. The USAAF assigned station No. 467 to the facility. USAAF Station Units assigned to RAF Aldermaston were:

- 318th Service Group (53d Troop Carrier Wing)

458th, 459th Service Squadron; HHS 318th Service Group

- 21st Weather Squadron
- 40th Mobile Communications Squadron
- 819th Medical Air Evacuation Transportation Squadron (53d Troop Carrier Wing)
- 97th Station Complement Squadron

Regular Army Station Units included:

- 1052nd Quartermaster Company
- 1068th Quartermaster Company
- 1075th Signal Company
- 1229th Military Police Company
- 1465th Ordnance Medium Maintenance Company
- 2249th Quartermaster Truck Company
- 2142nd Engineer Fire Fighting Platoon
- Detachment ZB (40th Mobile Communications Squadron)
- Weather Detachment ZB

Aldermaston Court

A non-flying facility located about one-half mine north of the airfield. It is a large country house which was purchased from the Keyser family by the British Government at the outbreak of World War II. Taken over by the USAAF, it became the headquarters of the XIX Tactical Air Command (formerly XIX Air Support Command). It was given the designation of AAF-476.

==== Eighth Air Force ====
60th Troop Carrier Group

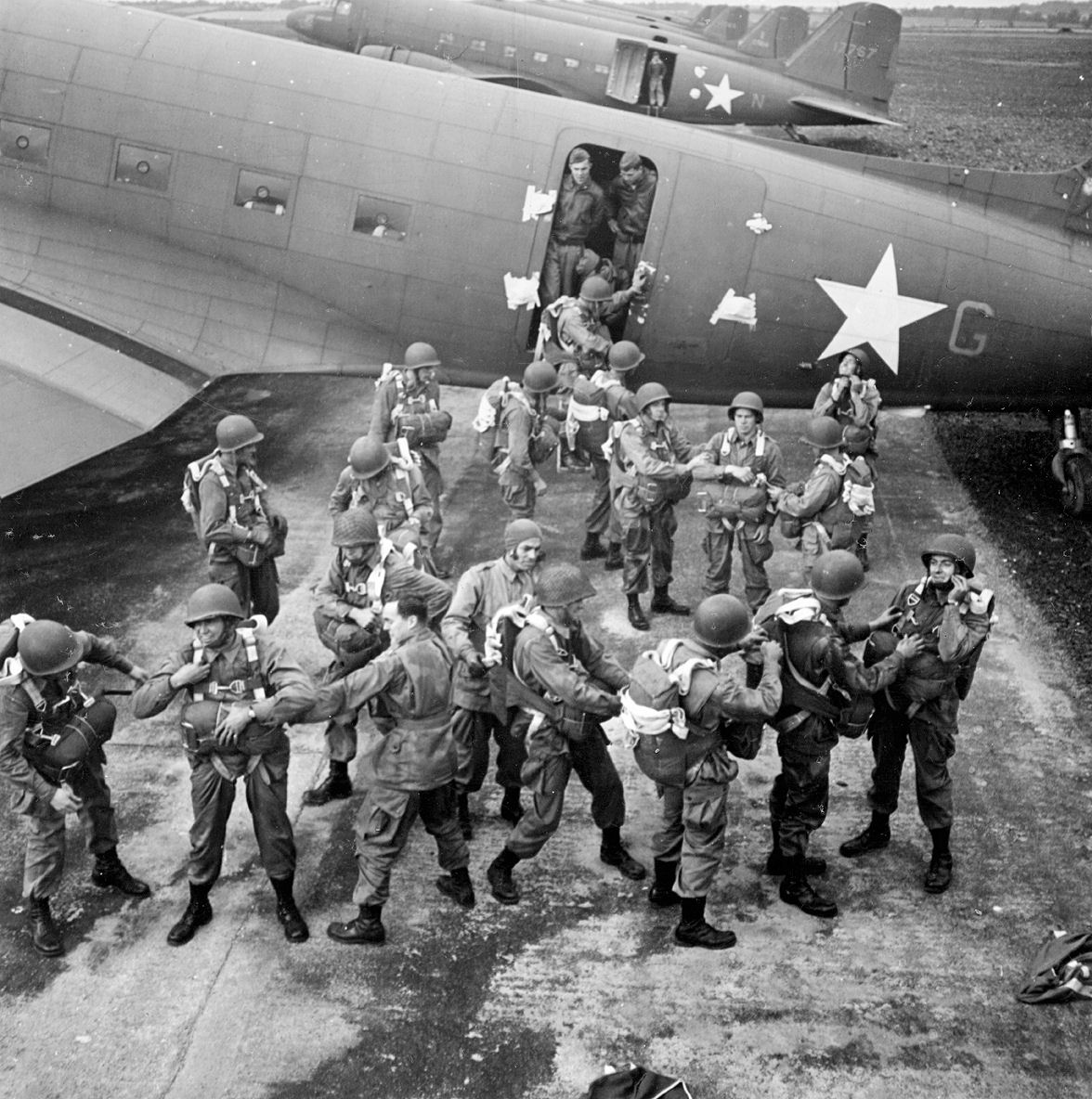
Paratroopers of the 503rd US Parachute Infantry Regiment prepare to board a C-47 Skytrain of the 60th Troop Carrier Group at Aldermaston, 23 September 1942

Due to Aldermaston's location in Berkshire, Eighth Air Force decided to use the base to station as a C-47 Troop Carrier base. Upon completion of construction in August, the 60th Troop Carrier Group (60th TCG) was transferred from its temporary locations at RAF Chelveston and RAF Podington in East Anglia, which became heavy bomber bases. The operational squadrons of the 60th TCG were:

- 10th Troop Carrier Squadron (S6) (Arrived 7 August from Chelveston)
- 11th Troop Carrier Squadron (7D) (Arrived 15 August from Chelveston)
- 12th Troop Carrier Squadron (U5) (Arrived 15 August from Podington)
- 28th Troop Carrier Squadron (3D) (Arrived 7 August from Podington)

The unit trained with Army paratroop units during the fall of 1942, preparing for combat operations in North Africa as part of the Operation Torch invasion of French North Africa. It flew its only combat mission on 8 November 1942 when it transported airborne paratroopers from Aldermaston, and dropping them at Oran, Algeria during the early hours of the invasion.

With the successful operation, the group moved to Relizane Airfield, Algeria on 8 November 1942. There, it was transferred to the new Twelfth Air Force where it continued combat operations as part of the Mediterranean Theater of Operations until the end of the war.

107th Observation Squadron

With the 60th's move to North Africa, the 107th Reconnaissance Squadron, 67th Observation Group, was moved to Aldermaston on a temporary basis from RAF Membury in Berkshire. It flew a mixture of light observation L-4 Grasshopper single engine and Douglas A-20 Havoc two-engine reconnaissance aircraft. It also had several Supermarine Spitfires. The squadron remained only until 8 January 1943 when it was moved back to Membury.

315th Troop Carrier Group

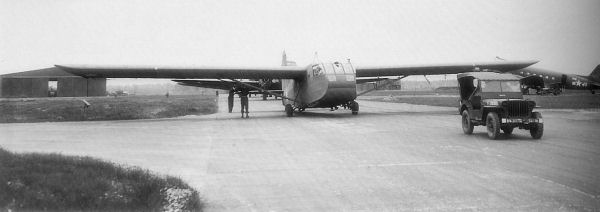
CG-4A Waco Glider of the 315th Troop Carrier Group, 1943.

Replacing the 60th TCG was the 315th Troop Carrier Group, which was deployed from the Florence Army Airfield, South Carolina in December 1942. Also equipped with C-47s, operational squadrons of the group at Aldermaston were:

- 34th Troop Carrier Squadron (NM)
- 43d Troop Carrier Squadron (UA)

Prior to its arrival, two of the group's squadrons were reassigned to Twelfth Air Force in North Africa, and the group only had 24 aircraft assigned while at Aldermaston. On 25 May 1943, twenty-one of the 315th's aircraft left for Algeria to support combat operations in North Africa. Although not participating in the airborne phase of the invasions of Sicily and Italy, the aircraft did support those operations by transporting supplies in the theater.

==== Ninth Air Force ====
With the reassignment of Ninth Air Force from Libya to the United Kingdom in October 1943, the 315th, along with all of the Eighth's Troop Carrier groups were transferred to the Ninth. The remaining components of the 315th TCG were moved to RAF Welford (AAF 474) in Berkshire. Jurisdiction of Aldermaston Airfield was also transferred to the Ninth,

15th Tactical Reconnaissance Squadron

In December 1943 the 15th Tactical Reconnaissance Squadron arrived in England from Key Field, Mississippi, It was initially assigned directly to Ninth Air Force, but the squadron arrived un-equipped. Ninth Air Force attached the squadron to the 67th Reconnaissance Group at RAF Middle Wallop (AAF-449) in late December. At Aldermaston, the squadron received Supermarine Spitfires from the Ministry of Aircraft assembly plant and trained with the aircraft until 1 May, when it was moved to RAF Chilbolton (AAF-404) in Hampshire.

370th Fighter Group

Delays in base construction and equipment delivery from the United States meant that the 370th Fighter Group arrived at Aldermaston in early February 1944 from Bradley Field, Connecticut un-equipped. Upon its arrival, the group expected to receive Republic P-47 Thunderbolts, however due to a lack of equipment in the United Kingdom, the unit was instead equipped with available Lockheed P-38 Lightnings. Also, Aldermaston was only a way-station for the unit, as the base was already programmed for Troop Carrier units to support the upcoming invasion of Normandy. After receiving the P-38s, the group was moved to RAF Andover (AAF-106) in Hampshire at the end of February.

434th Troop Carrier Group

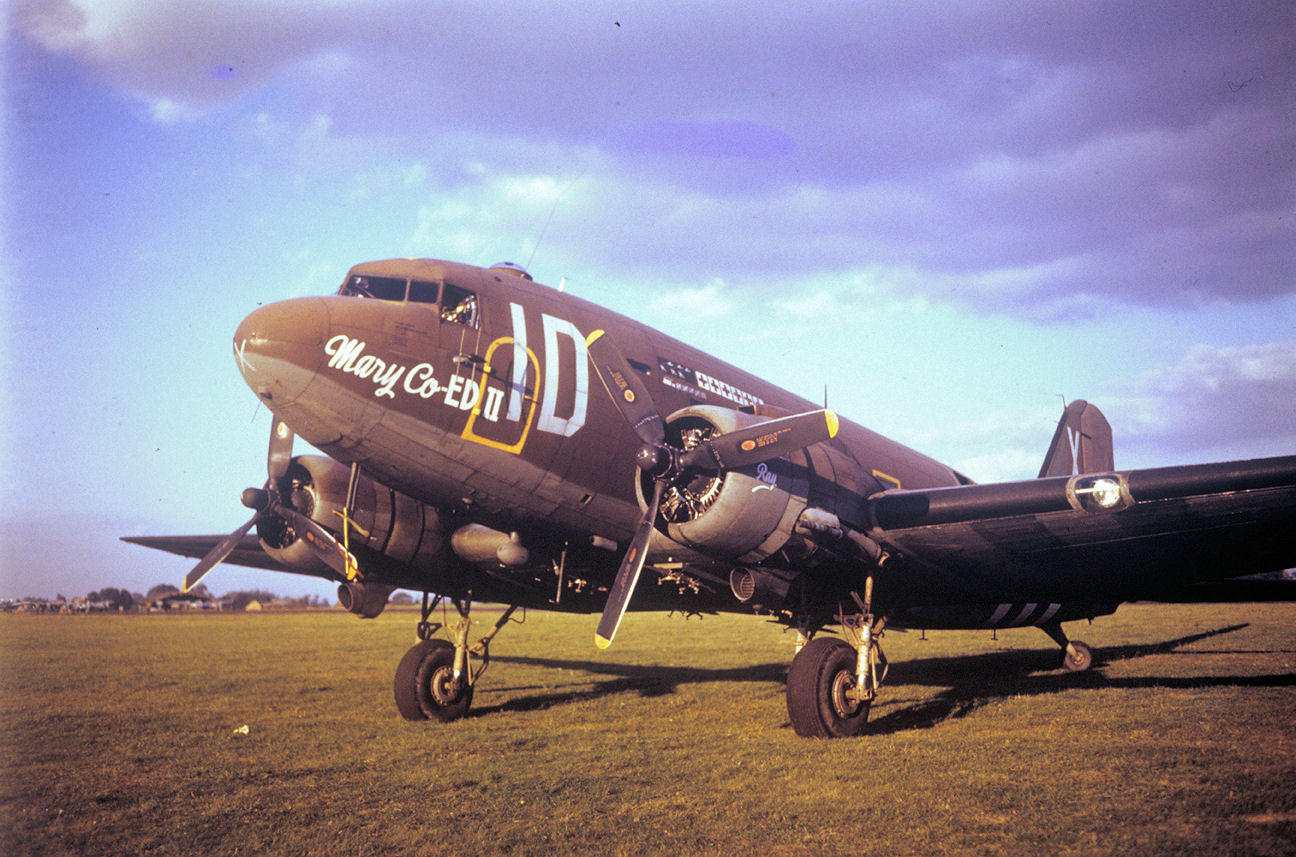
Douglas C-47 of the 74th Troop Carrier Squadron.

With the transfer of the 370th FG, the 434th Troop Carrier Group was moved to Aldermaston from RAF Fulbeck (AAF-488) in Lincolnshire on 3 March 1944. Its operational squadrons were:

- 71st Troop Carrier Squadron (CJ)
- 72d Troop Carrier Squadron (CU)
- 73d Troop Carrier Squadron (CN)
- 74th Troop Carrier Squadron (ID)

The 434th was programmed to drop the 101st Airborne Division in preparation for the invasion of northern France, and it was located with the 101st. The 434th was one of the groups trained and designated to deliver gliders on D-Day. As the assigned delivery group for Mission Chicago, the 52 C-47s of the 434th TCG each towed a Waco CG-4A glider to Normandy, losing one aircraft to flak in the darkness. For this, and two follow-up missions with gliders and supplies, the group was later awarded the coveted Distinguished Unit Citation.

After the invasion of France, the mission of the 435th became resupply and casualty evacuation of Allied ground forces on the continent. Supplies transported were, for the most part, critically needed items such as communications equipment and special ammunition In September, the 434th was again assigned the 101st Airborne Division which it transported into the Nazi-Occupied Netherlands as part of Operation Market, the airborne component of Operation Market-Garden. For the balance of 1944, the group returned to conducting resupply and casualty evacuation transport missions.

The 434th remained at Aldermaston until 12 February 1945 when the group moved to an Advanced Landing Ground (ALG) at Mourmelon-le-Grand Airfield (ALG A-80) in France.

With no further USAAF requirement for the station, Aldermaston was returned to the Air Ministry on 15 June 1945.

=== Ministry of Aircraft Production use ===
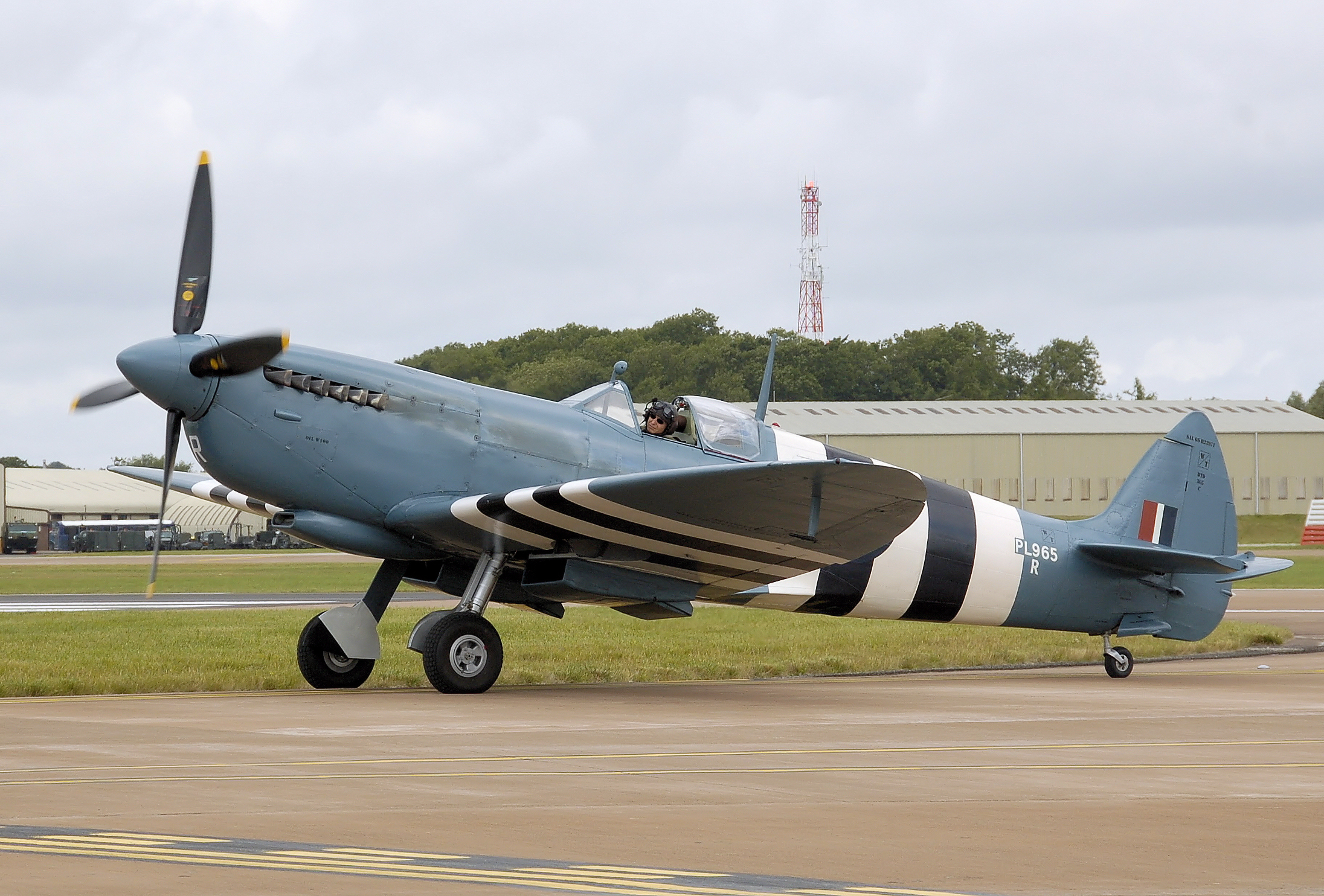
This Spitfire P.R Mk XI (PL965) was built at RAF Aldermaston

In July 1943 Vickers erected a large assembly facility and took over Hangar 5 for Supermarine Spitfire production. Components produced in the Southampton area were sent to the facility for assembly and final aircraft production. This was part of the dispersal program aimed at minimizing aircraft production due to the possibly of German bombing raids. It was co-located in the airfield technical site, and used the airfield along with the USAAF for test-flying newly produced aircraft. It remained in operation at Aldermaston until the Royal Air Force received operational control of the facility in 1946.

In 1949, Fairey Aviation used Aldermaston airfield for the first flight of the first prototype Fairey Gannet, serialled VR546, which was built in its factory at Hayes, Middlesex then taken by road to Aldermaston, reassembled and successfully test flown by the company's chief test pilot Gp/Capt R G Slade on 19 September.

=== Other units assigned ===
United States Army Air Forces

- HQ, IX Air Support Command (November 1943 - 1 February 1944)
- HQ, 71st Fighter Wing
- HQ, XIX Air Support Command (1 February 1944 - 15 June 1945)
- 370th Fighter Group (12–29 February 1944)
- 434th Troop Carrier Group (3 March 1944 - 12 February 1945)

== Postwar use ==
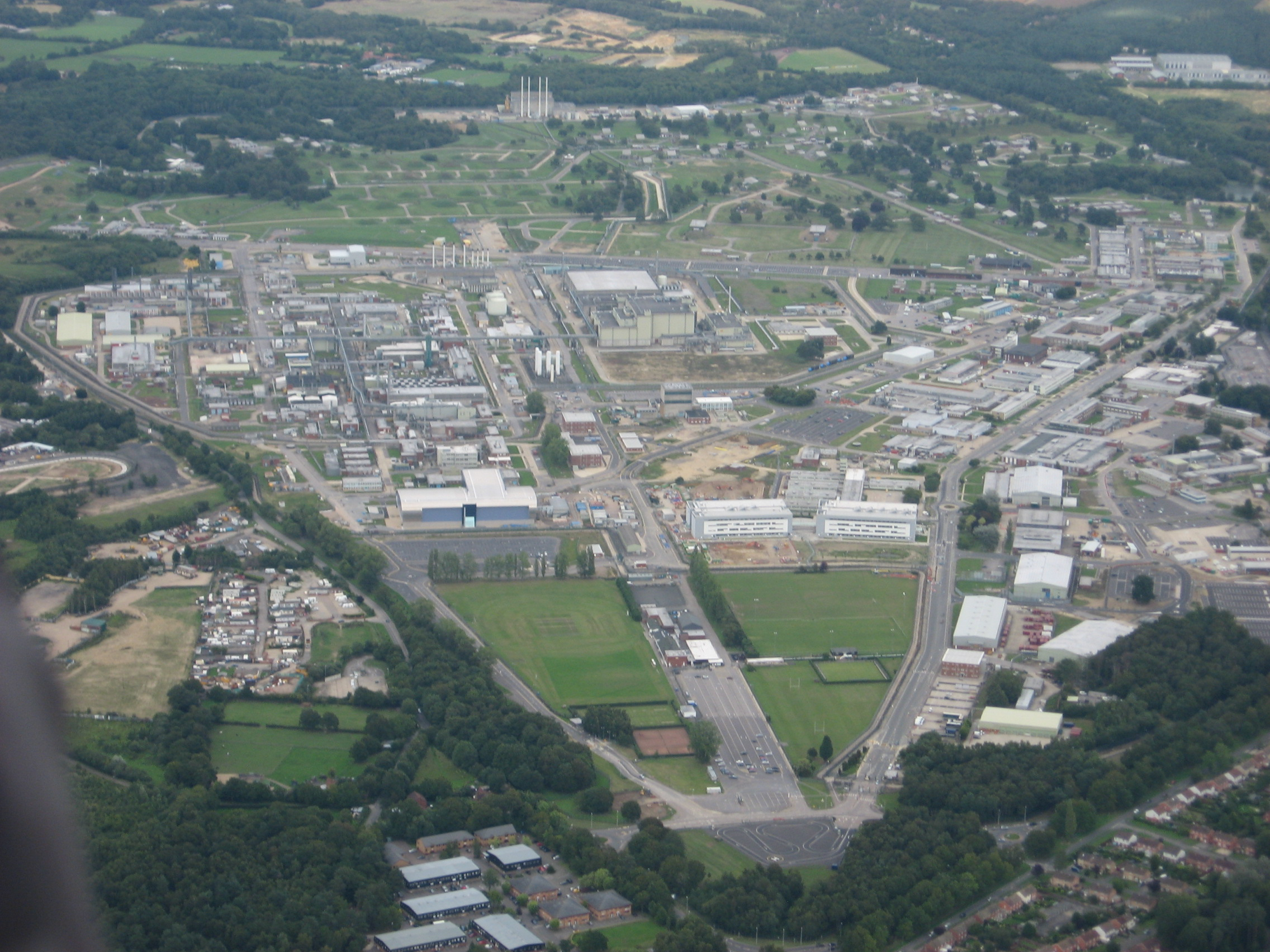
Atomic Weapons Establishment in 2009. Despite all the redevelopment since 1950, the alignment of the runways of RAF Aldermaston are still discernable.

The airfield was relinquished to the Air Ministry on 15 June 1945. It was to be the site for a flying school, where more than 1,000 former RAF pilots would be retrained to fly civil aircraft. Many of the buildings were refurbished and improved runway lights were installed.

From 15 June 1945 the following organisations used the airfield:

- No. 25 (RCAF) Air Crew Holding Unit (25 June - 1 December 1945)
- BOAC Training HQ (9 May 1946 - 1 January 1947)
- Airways Training Ltd (1 January 1947 - November 1948)

In 1950 the airfield was taken over by the Ministry of Supply to house the Atomic Weapons Research Establishment (A.W.R.E.).

== See also ==
- List of former Royal Air Force stations
