= Gerbini Airfield =

World War II airfield in Sicily, Italy

Gerbini Airfield
- Part of Twelfth Air Force
- Plain of Catania

Site information
- Type: Military airfield
- Code: 505
- Controlled by: United States Army Air Forces

Location
- Coordinates: 37°27′52.36″N 014°52′22.00″E

Site history
- Built: 1940
- In use: 1943-1944

Location of Gerbini Airfield, Sicily

Gerbini Airfield is a series of abandoned World War II military airfields in Paternò, Sicily, located 23 kilometres (14 mi) west of Catania, near the intersection of the A19 and SP24 highways. The airfields consisted of a series of flat agricultural fields, used for runways and parking areas. First used by Italian Regia Aeronautica:

- 37º Stormo, 1941-1942, Savoia-Marchetti SM. 81 P
- 132º Gruppo Autonomo Aerosiluranti 1942-1943, Savoia-Marchetti SM.79 S

It also housed German Luftwaffe forces during the Battle of Sicily, they were attacked on several occasions by United States Army Air Force Twelfth Air Force bomber aircraft.

Later, they were seized by Allied ground forces and used by the USAAF during the battle. Army engineers compacted the earth and improved the field for use by light and medium bombers. Also a tent encampment was established for ground support and for station infrastructure. Twelfth Air Force units stationed at Gerbini were:

- 47th Bombardment Group, 20–24 August 1943, A-20 Havoc
- 12th Bombardment Group, 22 August-2 November 1943, B-25 Mitchell
- 60th Troop Carrier Group, 20 October 1943 – 5 March 1944, C-47 Skytrain

When the C-47s moved out at the end of 1944, the airfield was dismantled and returned to its owners. A runway is still present, though the cement is broken up in many places by weeds. The outline of the runway is visible on Google satellite view.
