= Ghriss Airport =

- IATA: MUW; ICAO: DAOV

Summary
- Airport type: Public
- Serves: Mascara, Algeria
- Location: Ghriss, Algeria
- Elevation AMSL: 1,686 ft (514 m)
- Coordinates: 35°12′28″N 000°08′50″E

Map
- Location of airport in Algeria

Runways
Direction	Length		Surface
Direction	ft	m	Surface
08/26	5,577	1,700	Asphalt
- Source:World Aero Data

Ghriss Airport (IATA: MUW, ICAO: DAOV) is a civilian airport in Ghriss, Mascara Province, Algeria, located 5.0 km southwest of the town of Ghriss, Algeria.

== World War II ==
During World War II, the facility was known as "Thiersville Airfield". It was a Twelfth Air Force base of operations during the North African Campaign used by the 60th Troop Carrier Group, which flew C-47 Skytrain transports from the airfield between May and June 1943.

== Airlines and destinations ==
Airlines	Destinations
Tassili Airlines	Algiers
