= Relizane Airport =

- IATA: none; ICAO: DAAZ

Summary
- Airport type: Public
- Location: Algeria
- Elevation AMSL: 282 ft (86 m)
- Coordinates: 35°45′10″N 000°37′30″E

Map
- Location within Algeria

Runways
Direction	Length		Surface
Direction	ft	m	Surface
07/25	4,265	1,300	Asphalt
- Source:World Aero Data Google Maps

Relizane Airport (ICAO: DAAZ) is a civilian airport in Algeria, located 12.5 kilometres (7.8 mi) west-northwest of Zemmora (Relizane); about 235 kilometres (146 mi) west-southwest of Algiers. It is used by general aviation, with no scheduled commercial air service.

== World War II ==
During World War II, it was a major Twelfth Air Force base of operations during the North African Campaign against the German Afrika Korps, used by the 60th Troop Carrier Group, flying C-47 Skytrain aircraft from the field between 27 November 1942 and May 1943.
