= 365th Bombardment Squadron =

Inactive US Air Force unit

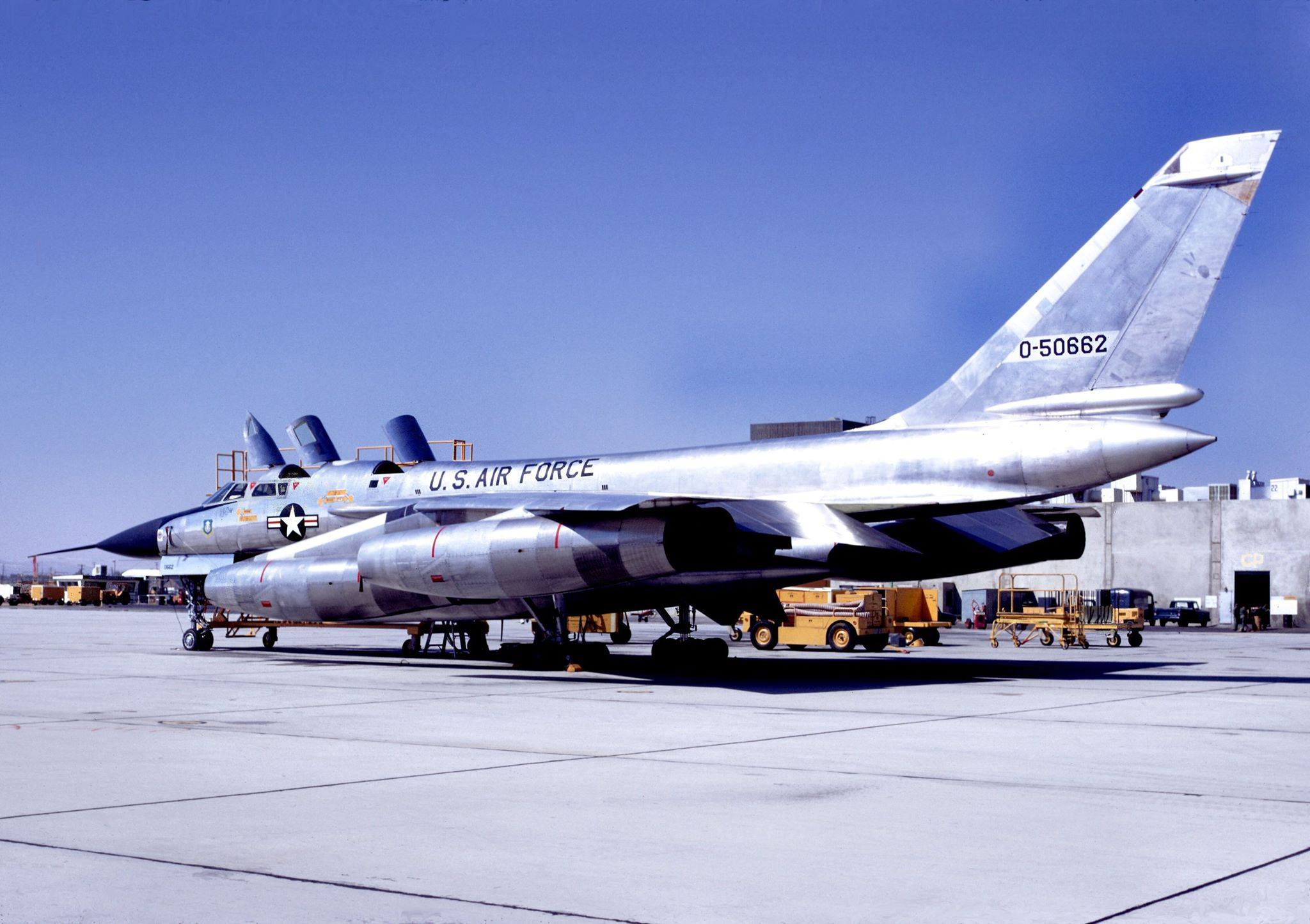
- B-58A Hustler, last type flown by the squadron (Note: The aircraft is Convair TB-58A-CF Hustler, serial 55-662. It was originally a YB-58A, converted to TB-58A and used as chase plane at Edwards AFB for the XB-70 project; then assigned to the 305th Bombardment Wing and set record by flying 256 sorties without a late or missed takeoff. It was sent to Military Aircraft Storage and Disposition Center on 17 January 1970 and scrapped on 21 July 1977. Brewer, Alex P.; Brewer, Randy A. "B-58.com, The B-58 Hustler Page: Inventory". B-58.com..)
- Active: 1942-1946; 1947-1948; 1951-1970
- Country: United States
- Branch: United States Air Force
- Role: Bombardment
- Engagements: European Theater of Operations
- Decorations: Distinguished Unit Citation; Air Force Outstanding Unit Award

Insignia
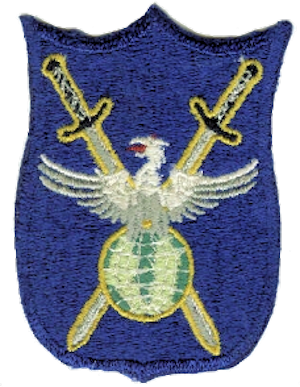
- Patch with 365th Bombardment Squadron emblem (Note: Approved 20 June 1952. Description: On a shield, blue, two swords, natural colors crossed horizontally, bordered golden yellow, over which is an eagle, natural colors, facing to the right, wings spread horizontally, perched on top of a globe, natural colors, bordered golden yellow, and with latitude and longitude lines white.)

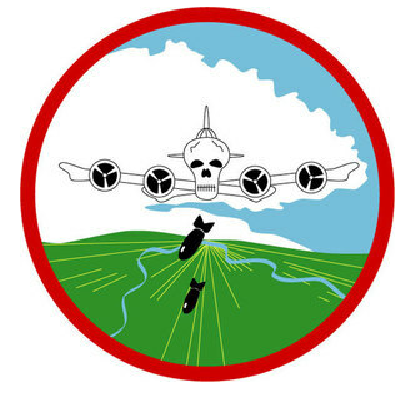
- 365th Bombardment Squadron emblem(World War II)
- World War II fuselage code: XK

The 365th Bombardment Squadron is an inactive United States Air Force unit. It was first activated in March 1942. After training with Boeing B-17 Flying Fortress bombers in the United States, the squadron deployed to the European Theater of Operations, where it participated in the strategic bombing campaign against Germany. The squadron was twice awarded the Distinguished Unit Citation for its combat actions. Following V-E Day, it moved to the continent of Europe and engaged in photographic mapping until inactivating in December 1946.

The squadron was briefly active on paper from 1947 to 1949. It was activated again in 1951 as a strategic bomber unit, flying Boeing B-47 Stratojets. In 1959, it moved to Indiana, where it converted to the Convair B-58 Hustler. It was inactivated in 1970, when the Hustler was phased out of service.

== History ==
=== World War II ===
==== Initial organization and training ====
The squadron was first activated at Salt Lake City Army Air Base, Utah on 1 March 1942 as one of the original squadrons of the 305th Bombardment Group. and began training on the Boeing B-17 Flying Fortress. In June, it moved to Geiger Field, Washington, and in July, to Muroc Army Air Field, California for more intensive training. On 23 August, its ground echelon left for Fort Dix, New Jersey and sailed for the European Theater of Operations on the RMS Queen Mary on 5 September, landing in Scotland on 12 September. The air echelon received additional training at Hancock Field, New York, before taking the North Atlantic ferrying route to Prestwick in September and October.

==== Combat in Europe ====
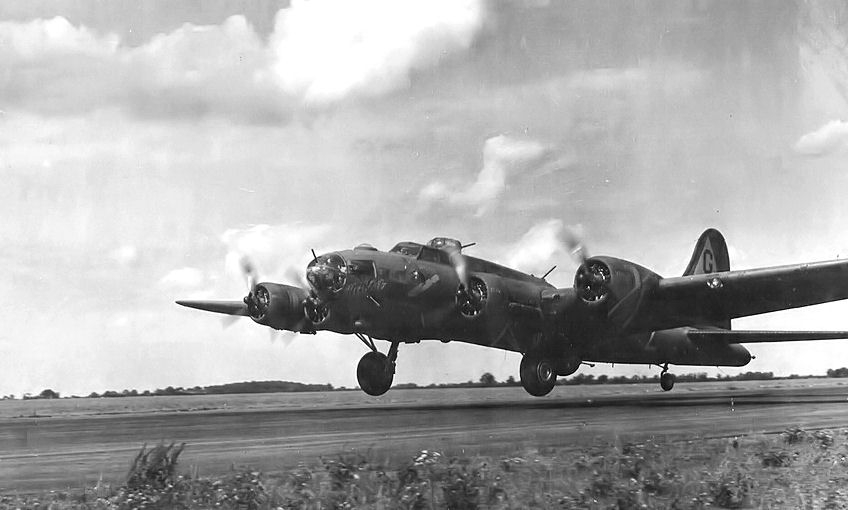
Squadron B-17 Flying Fortress Hell Cat (Note: Aircraft is Lockheed Vega built Boeing B-17F-35-VE Flying Fortress, serial 42-5910. Hell Cat. This aircraft was originally assigned to the 326th Bombardment Squadron and named Ruthie. It was badly shot up by fighters on the 4 July 1943, mission to Nantes but managed to return to RAF Alconbury. After being repaired she was transferred to the 365th and renamed Hell Cat. It ran out of fuel and crash landed at Hawkinge, England on 15 September 1943 and was scrapped two days later. Photo taken at RAF Chelveston.)

The ground echelon arrived at RAF Grafton Underwood in September. The squadron flew its first mission on 17 November 1942. In December it moved to RAF Chelveston, which would be its combat station for the remainder of the war.

The squadron primarily engaged in the strategic bombing campaign against Germany. It attacked targets in Belgium, France and Germany, including Kriegsmarine targets such as submarine pens, docks, harbors and shipyards. This included the attack on the naval yards at Wilhelmshaven on 27 January 1943, when heavy bombers of VIII Bomber Command made their first combat strike in German airspace.

It also attacked automotive factories and marshalling yards on the continent. On 4 April 1943, it made a precision strike on the Renault automotive factory in Paris in the face of devastating fighter attacks by an estimated 50 to 75 Focke-Wulf Fw 190s, which attacked the squadron's formation for fifty minutes, and heavy flak, (Note: Maurer describes the flak as heavy, but Freeman describes it as light, at least until the unit reached its target.) for which it was awarded the Distinguished Unit Citation (DUC). Missions included attacks on Berlin, oil refineries at Merseburg, aircraft factories at Anklam, shipping at Gdynia and the ball bearing factories at Schweinfurt.

On 11 January 1944, the squadron participated in an attack on an aircraft plant in central Germany, near Brunswick. Extensive cloud cover had resulted in the recall of two of the three bombardment divisions involved in the mission and made the rendezvous of the fighter groups scheduled to provide cover in the target area difficult. In contrast, clear weather to the east of the target permitted the Germans to assemble one of the largest fighter formations since October 1943, with 207 enemy fighters making contact with the strike force. For this mission, it was awarded a second DUC. Between 20 and 25 February 1944, it took part in Big Week, the intensive campaign by Eighth Air Force against the German aircraft manufacturing industry.

The squadron was occasionally diverted from its strategic mission to carry out interdiction and air support missions. Prior to Operation Overlord, the invasion of Normandy, it helped neutralize enemy forces with attacks on airfields, V-1 flying bomb and V-2 rocket launch facilities and repair shops. On D Day, it struck enemy strongholds near the landing beaches. In July 1944 it attacked enemy positions in advance of ground forces in Operation Cobra, the breakout at Saint Lo. It attacked antiaircraft batteries to support Operation Market Garden, the airborne attacks near Arnhem attempting to secure a bridgehead across the Rhine. In December 1944 and January 1945, it attacked enemy installations near the Battle of the Bulge. In March 1945, it supported Operation Varsity, airborne assault across the Rhine in Germany.

The squadron flew its last combat mission on 25 April 1945. Following V-E Day, the squadron moved to Sint-Truiden Airfield in Belgium, from which it conducted photographic mapping flights over Europe and North Africa which came under the name Project Casey Jones. On 15 December 1945 it became part of the occupation force, when it moved to Lechfeld Airfield, Germany which it had bombed on 18 March 1944, and which it now used as an occupation base. The squadron was reduced in both personnel and equipment during 1946. It flew mapping flights, mostly from airfields in North Africa. It was inactivated on 25 December 1946.

=== Strategic Air Command ===
The squadron, along with a number of other units, was activated at Andrews Field in 1947 as a paper unit. It was not manned or equipped before inactivating on 6 September 1948

The squadron was reactivated at MacDill Air Force Base, Florida under Strategic Air Command (SAC) in January 1951. However, SAC's mobilization for the Korean War highlighted that SAC wing commanders focused too much on running the base organization and were not spending enough time on overseeing actual combat preparations. To allow wing commanders the ability to focus on combat operations, the air base group commander became responsible for managing the base housekeeping functions. Under the plan implemented the month after the squadron activated and finalized in June 1952, the wing commander focused primarily on the combat units and the maintenance necessary to support combat aircraft, and the squadron was attached directly to the 305th Bombardment Wing. The squadron initially equipped with the obsolescent Boeing B-29 Superfortress.

==== B-47 operations ====
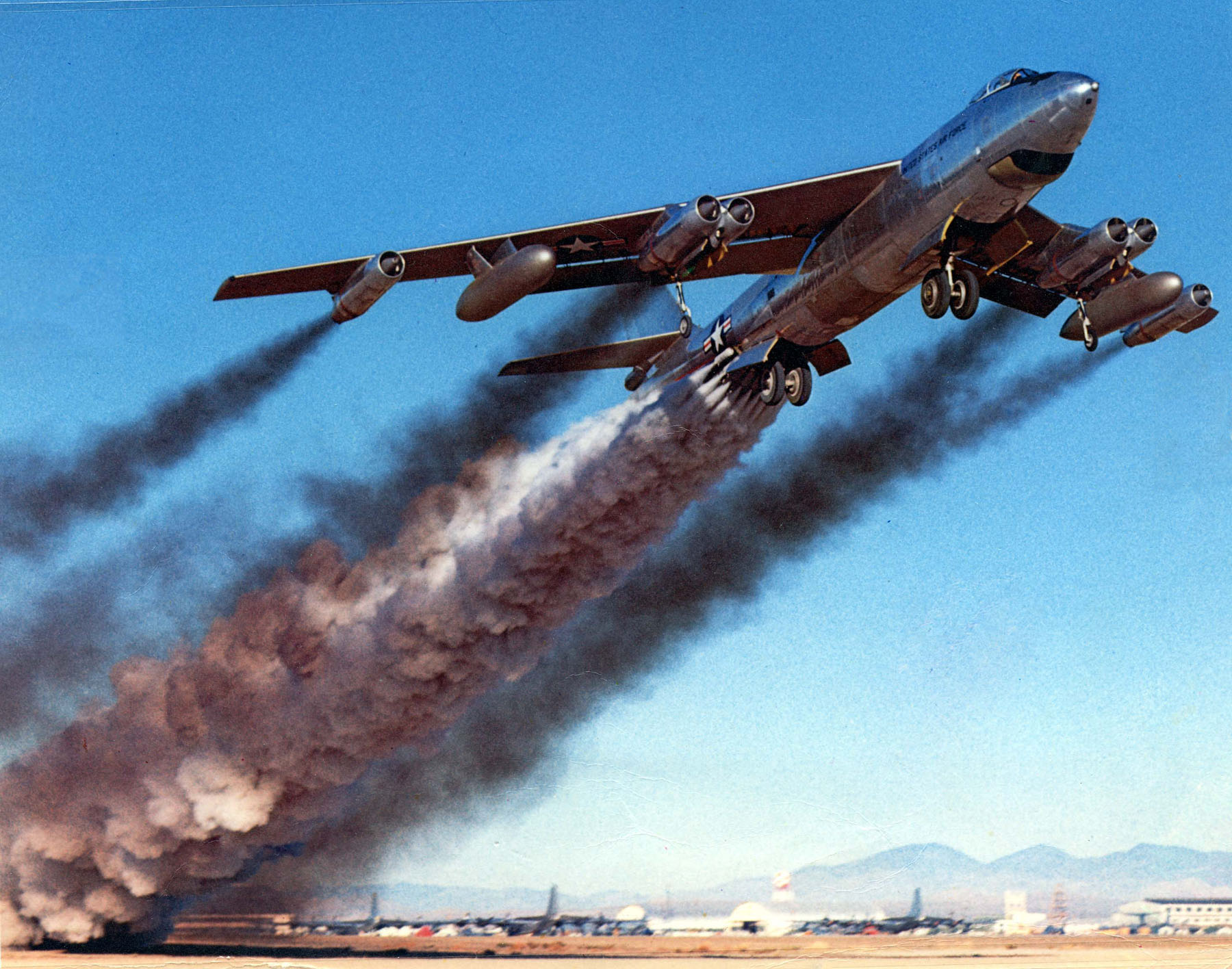
Boeing B-47B taking off with rocket assist

In 1952, the squadron began to equip with Boeing B-47 Stratojet medium jet bombers, and all B-29s had left the squadron by 1953. The squadron was one of the first to equip with the B-47B. Once equipped with the Stratojet, the squadron deployed with the 305th Wing to RAF Brize Norton from September to December 1953, relieving the 306th Bombardment Wing, which had been the first B-47 wing to deploy to England. The squadron would deploy with the wing twice more, from November 1955 to June 1956 and from January to March 1957, both times to Morocco. In 1955, SAC upgraded the squadron to the B-47E, the major production version of the Stratojet.

From 1958, the Boeing B-47 units of SAC began to assume an alert posture at their home bases, reducing the amount of time spent on alert at overseas bases. General Thomas S. Power’s initial goal was to maintain one third of SAC's planes on fifteen minute ground alert, fully fueled and ready for combat to reduce vulnerability to a Soviet missile strike. The squadron moved to Bunker Hill Air Force Base, Indiana in May 1959.

==== B-58 operations ====
The squadron began training crews on the Convair B-58 Hustler in 1961, replacing its Stratojets. The squadron also was equipped with training models of the Hustler.

At the beginning of the Cuban Missile Crisis in October 1962, Only six B-58s in the entire SAC inventory were on alert. Even these aircraft were "second cycle" (follow on) sorties. Training was suspended, and the squadron, along with SAC's other B-58 squadrons, began placing its bombers on alert. By the first week of November, 84 B-58s were standing nuclear alert, and as SAC redeployed its Boeing KC-135 Stratotankers, 20 of these were "first cycle" sorties. (Note: The availability of KC-135s to refuel the B-58s was the main factor in relegating them to the second cycle of the war plan. KC-135s were primarily dedicated to refueling B-52s. See Kipp et al. p. 30 and following for SAC bomber actions during the Cuban Crisis.) Within a short time, this grew to 41 bombers. By 20 November, SAC resumed its normal alert posture, and half the squadron's aircraft were kept on alert.

In December 1965, Robert S. McNamara, Secretary of Defense announced a phaseout program that would further reduce SAC's bomber force. This program called for the mid-1971 retirement of all B-58s and some Boeing B-52 Stratofortress models. With the removal of the B-58 from SAC's bomber force, the squadron was inactivated at the end of January 1970.

== Lineage ==
- Constituted as the 365th Bombardment Squadron (Heavy) on 28 January 1942

Activated on 1 March 1942
Redesignated 365th Bombardment Squadron, Heavy c. 20 August 1943
Inactivated on 25 December 1946
Redesignated 365th Bombardment Squadron, Very Heavy on 11 June 1947
Activated on 1 July 1947
Inactivated on 6 September 1948
Redesignated 365th Bombardment Squadron Medium on 20 December 1950
Activated on 2 January 1951
Inactivated on 1 January 1970 (Note: This squadron is not related to the Bombardment Squadron, Provisional, 365, that was designated and activated on 1 July 1972 at Andersen Air Force Base, Guam and assigned to the Strategic Wing, Provisional, 72. It moved U-Tapao Royal Thai Navy Airfield, Thailand on 1 January 1973, where it was attached to the 307th Strategic Wing. The squadron served as headquarters for Boeing B-52D Stratofortress crews and aircraft deployed to Southeast Asia until it was inactivated on 30 June 1975.)

=== Assignments ===
- 305th Bombardment Group, 1 March 1942
- XII Tactical Air Command, 1 November 1946 – 25 December 1946
- 305th Bombardment Group, 1 July 1947 – 6 September 1948
- 305th Bombardment Group, 2 January 1951 (attached to 305th Bombardment Wing after 10 February 1951)
- 305th Bombardment Wing, 16 June 1952 – 1 January 1970

=== Stations ===
- Salt Lake City Army Air Base, Utah, 1 March 1942
- Geiger Field, Washington, 11 June 1942
- Muroc Army Air Field, California, 4 July 1942
- RAF Grafton Underwood (AAF-106), England, 11 September 1942
- RAF Chelveston (AAF-105), England, 11 December 1942
- Sint-Truiden (Saint-Trond) Airfield (A-92), Belgium, 25 July 1945
- AAF Station Lechfeld (R-71), Germany, c. 19 December 1945 – 25 December 1946 (operated primarily from Tripoli, Libya January – October 1946 and Port Lyautey Morocco thereafter)
- Andrews Field (later Andrews Air Force Base), Maryland, 1 July 1947 – 6 September 1948
- MacDill Air Force Base, Florida, 2 January 1951
- Bunker Hill Air Force Base (later Grissom Air Force Base), Indiana, 1 June 1959 – 1 January 1970

=== Aircraft ===
- Boeing B-17 Flying Fortress, 1942–1946
- Boeing B-29 Superfortress, 1951–1953
- Boeing B-47 Stratojet, 1952–1960
- Convair B-58 Hustler, 1960–1970

=== Awards and campaigns ===
Award streamer	Award	Dates	Notes
	Distinguished Unit Citation	4 April 1943	France,
	Distinguished Unit Citation	11 January 1944	Germany,
	Air Force Outstanding Unit Award	1 January 1954 – 1 March 1957	

Campaign Streamer	Campaign	Dates	Notes
	Air Combat, EAME Theater	13 September 1942–11 May 1945	
	Air Offensive, Europe	13 September 1942–5 June 1944	
	Normandy	6 June 1944–24 July 1944	
	Northern France	25 July 1944–14 September 1944	
	Rhineland	15 September 1944–21 March 1945	
	Ardennes-Alsace	16 December 1944–25 January 1945	
	Central Europe	22 March 1944–21 May 1945	

== See also ==
- B-17 Flying Fortress units of the United States Army Air Forces
- List of B-29 Superfortress operators
- List of B-47 units of the United States Air Force
