= Edward Michael =

Edward Michael may refer to:

- Edward S. Michael (1918–1994), United States Army Air Forces officer and Medal of Honor recipient
- Edward Salim Michael (1921–2006), composer of symphonic music
