= 364th Bombardment Squadron =

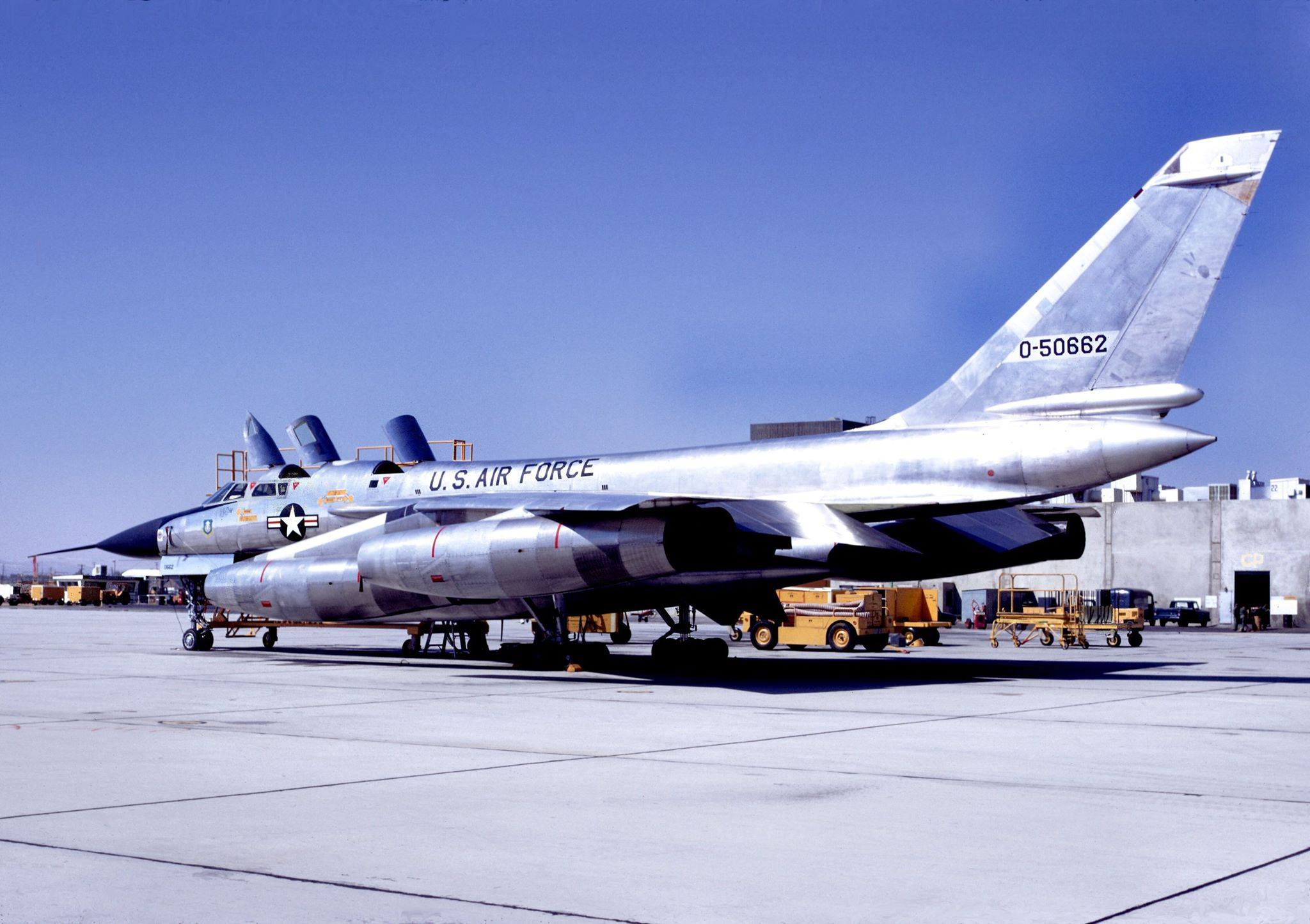
- B-58A Hustler, last type flown by the squadron (Note: This aircraft is Convair TB-58A-CF Hustler, serial 55-662. Originally a YB-58A, it was converted to TB-58A and used as chase plane at Edwards Air Force Base for the North American XB-70 Valkyrie project; then was assigned to the 305th Bombardment Wing and set a record by flying 256 sorties without a late or missed takeoff. It was sent to Military Aircraft Storage and Disposition Center on 17 January 1970 and scrapped on 21 July 1977. Brewer, Alex P.; Brewer, Randy A. "B-58.com, The B-58 Hustler Page: Inventory". B-58.com.)
- Active: 1942–1946; 1947–1948; 1951–1970
- Country: United States
- Branch: United States Air Force
- Role: Medium bomber
- Engagements: European Theater of Operations
- Decorations: Distinguished Unit Citation; Air Force Outstanding Unit Award

Insignia
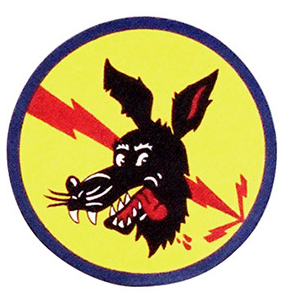
- 364th Bombardment Squadron emblem (Note: Approved 18 October 1944. Description: On a yellow disc, wide border blue, a caricatured black wolf's head with white teeth, red tongue, and red mark in eft ear in front of a large red, jagged lightning flash bendwise, striking to sinister base, and having two small red flashes converging chevronwise inverted at the point of impact.)
- World War II fuselage code: WF

The 364th Bombardment Squadron is an inactive United States Air Force unit. Its last assignment was with the 305th Bombardment Wing at Grissom Air Force Base, Indiana, where it was inactivated on 1 January 1970. The squadron was first activated in March 1942. After training in the United States, it moved to England in the fall of 1942, where it participated in the strategic bombing campaign against Germany, earning two Distinguished Unit Citations for its actions. Following V-E Day, the squadron moved to Germany, where it formed part of the occupation forces until inactivating in December 1946.

The squadron was reactivated in 1947, but does not seem to have been equipped or manned before it was inactivated in 1948. It was activated under Strategic Air Command (SAC) in 1951 as Boeing B-47 Stratojet unit. In 1961, it converted to the Convair B-58 Hustler, which it flew until inactivating.

== History ==
=== World War II ===
==== Initial organization and training ====
The squadron was first activated at Salt Lake City Army Air Base, Utah on 1 March 1942 as one of the original squadrons of the 305th Bombardment Group. and began training on the Boeing B-17 Flying Fortress. In June, it moved to Geiger Field, Washington, and in July, to Muroc Army Air Field, California for more intensive training. On 23 August, its ground echelon left for Fort Dix, New Jersey and sailed for the European Theater of Operations on the RMS Queen Mary on 5 September, landing in Scotland on 12 September. The air echelon received additional training at Hancock Field, New York, before taking the North Atlantic ferrying route to Prestwick in September and October.

==== Combat in Europe ====
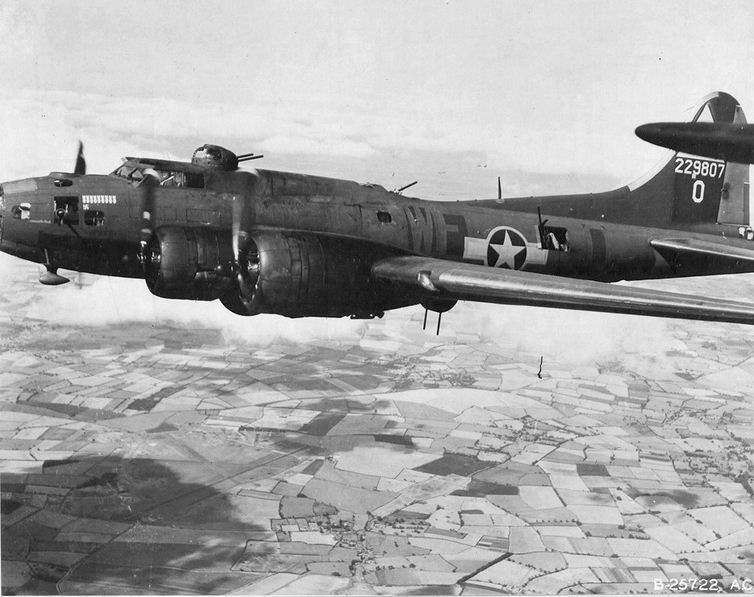
Squadron B-17F Flying Fortress (Note: Aircraft is Boeing B-17F-70-BO Flying Fortress, serial 42-29807, Lady Liberty. It was originally assigned to the 334th Bombardment Squadron and named Patsy Ann III.)

The ground echelon arrived at RAF Grafton Underwood in September. The squadron flew its first mission on 17 November 1942. In December it moved to RAF Chelveston, which would be its combat station for the remainder of the war.

The squadron primarily engaged in the strategic bombing campaign against Germany. It attacked targets in Belgium, France and Germany, including Kriegsmarine targets such as submarine pens, docks, harbors and shipyards. This included the attack on the naval yards at Wilhelmshaven on 27 January 1943, when heavy bombers of VIII Bomber Command made their first combat strike in German airspace.

It also attacked automotive factories and marshalling yards on the continent. On 4 April 1943, it made a precision strike on the Renault automotive factory in Paris in the face of devastating fighter attacks by an estimated 50 to 75 Focke-Wulf Fw 190s, which attacked the squadron's formation for fifty minutes, and heavy flak, (Note: Maurer describes the flak as heavy, but Freeman describes it as light, at least until the unit reached its target.) for which it was awarded the Distinguished Unit Citation (DUC). Missions included attacks on Berlin, oil refineries at Merseburg, aircraft factories at Anklam, shipping at Gdynia and the ball bearing factories at Schweinfurt.

On 11 January 1944, the squadron participated in an attack on an aircraft plant in central Germany, near Brunswick. Extensive cloud cover had resulted in the recall of two of the three bombardment divisions involved in the mission and made the rendezvous of the fighter groups scheduled to provide cover in the target area difficult. In contrast, clear weather to the east of the target permitted the Germans to assemble one of the largest fighter formations since October 1943, with 207 enemy fighters making contact with the strike force. For this mission, it was awarded a second DUC. Between 20 and 25 February 1944, it took part in Big Week, the intensive campaign by Eighth Air Force against the German aircraft manufacturing industry.

On the first day of Big Week, the B-17 flown by Lt William R. Lawley was attacked head on by German fighters as it turned away from the target. A cannon shell exploded in the cockpit, killing the copilot and seriously wounding Lt Lawley, the pilot. Seven other aircrew were wounded and an engine was set on fire. Lt Lawley forced the copilot's body off the controls, which had put the aircraft in an out of control dive and recovered control. Because of the fire and the inability of the plane to release it bombs, Lt Lawley ordered the crew to bail out because of the danger of an explosion. However, several wounded crew members could not bail out, so he continued home. Further attacks took out a second engine. On the long flight home Lawley lost consciousness and the bombardier, who had finally managed to jettison the bombs, flew the plane until Lawley could land the plane. A third engine failed as he successfully crash landed without further injury to the crew remaining aboard the bomber. For this action, Lt Lawley was awarded the Medal of Honor.

Less than two months later, on 11 April 1944, a squadron bomber flown by Lt Edward S. Michael was hit by cannon shells, causing the aircraft to enter a spin. Enemy fighters followed the bomber on its spiral down and wounded both Lt Michael and his copilot. Recovering from the spin, the pilots found that part of the plane's incendiary bomb load had caught fire. The emergency jettison lever failed and Lt Michael ordered the crew to bail out. However, the bombardier's parachute had been damaged by enemy fire, and Lt Michael decided to return to England. Although loss of blood rendered him periodically unconscious, Lt Michael was able to make a successful crash landing. For this action, he was also awarded a Medal of Honor

The squadron was occasionally diverted from its strategic mission to carry out interdiction and air support missions. Prior to Operation Overlord, the invasion of Normandy, it helped neutralize enemy forces with attacks on airfields, V-1 flying bomb and V-2 rocket launch facilities and repair shops. On D Day, it struck enemy strongholds near the landing beaches. In July 1944 it attacked enemy positions in advance of ground forces in Operation Cobra, the breakout at Saint Lo. It attacked antiaircraft batteries to support Operation Market Garden, the airborne attacks near Arnhem attempting to secure a bridgehead across the Rhine. In December 1944 and January 1945, it attacked enemy installations near the Battle of the Bulge. In March 1945, it supported Operation Varsity, airborne assault across the Rhine in Germany.

The squadron flew its last combat mission on 25 April 1945. Following V-E Day, the squadron moved to Sint-Truiden Airfield in Belgium, from which it conducted photographic mapping flights over Europe and North Africa which came under the name Project Casey Jones. On 15 December 1945 it became part of the occupation force, when it moved to Lechfeld Airfield, Germany which it had bombed on 18 March 1944, and which it now used as an occupation base. The squadron was reduced in both personnel and equipment during 1946. Its mapping operations ended in June and by the end of October, it had stopped all operations. It was inactivated on 25 December 1946.

=== Strategic Air Command ===
Strategic Air Command (SAC) activated the squadron in July 1947 at Andrews Field, Maryland, but was inactivated the following September, apparently never having been manned or equipped for operations.

The squadron was reactivated at MacDill Air Force Base, Florida under Strategic Air Command (SAC) in January 1951. However, SAC’s mobilization for the Korean War highlighted that SAC wing commanders focused too much on running the base organization and not spending enough time on overseeing actual combat preparations. To allow wing commanders the ability to focus on combat operations, the air base group commander became responsible for managing the base housekeeping functions. Under the plan implemented the month after the squadron activated and finalized in June 1952, the wing commander focused primarily on the combat units and the maintenance necessary to support combat aircraft, and the squadron was attached directly to the 305th Bombardment Wing. The squadron initially equipped with the obsolescent Boeing B-29 Superfortress.

==== B-47 operations ====
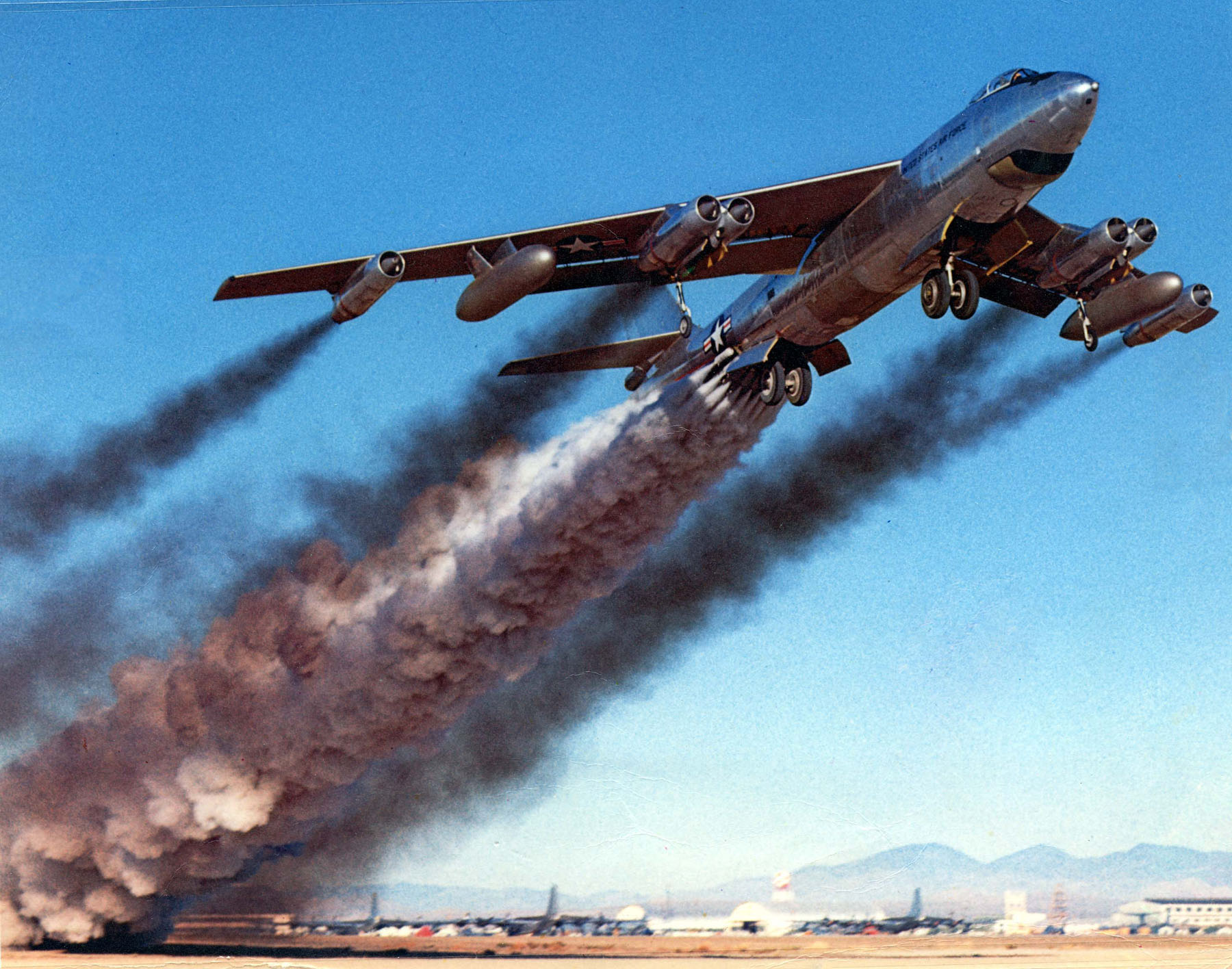
Boeing B-47B taking off with rocket assist

In 1952, the squadron began to equip with Boeing B-47 Stratojet medium jet bombers, and all B-29s had left the squadron by 1953. The squadron was one of the first to equip with the B-47B. Once equipped with the Stratojet, the squadron deployed with the 305th Wing to RAF Brize Norton from September to December of 1953, relieving the 306th Bombardment Wing, which had been the first B-47 wing to deploy to England. The squadron would deploy with the wing twice more, from November 1955 to June 1956 and from January to March 1957, both times to Morocco. In 1955, SAC upgraded the squadron to the B-47E, the major production version of the Stratojet.

From 1958, the Boeing B-47 units of SAC began to assume an alert posture at their home bases, reducing the amount of time spent on alert at overseas bases. General Thomas S. Power’s initial goal was to maintain one third of SAC’s planes on fifteen minute ground alert, fully fueled and ready for combat to reduce vulnerability to a Soviet missile strike. The squadron moved to Bunker Hill Air Force Base, Indiana in May 1959.

==== B-58 operations ====
The squadron began training crews on the Convair B-58 Hustler in 1961, replacing its Stratojets. The squadron also was equipped with training models of the Hustler.

At the beginning of the Cuban Missile Crisis in October 1962, Only six B-58s in the entire SAC inventory were on alert. Even these aircraft were "second cycle" (follow on) sorties. Training was suspended, and the squadron, along with SAC's other B-58 squadrons, began placing its bombers on alert. By the first week of November, 84 B-58s were standing nuclear alert, and as SAC redeployed its Boeing KC-135 Stratotankers, 20 of these were "first cycle" sorties. (Note: The availability of KC-135s to refuel the B-58s was the main factor in relegating them to the second cycle of the war plan. KC-135s were primarily dedicated to refueling B-52s. See Kipp et al. p. 30 and following for SAC bomber actions during the Cuban Crisis.) Within a short time, this grew to 41 bombers. By 20 November, SAC resumed its normal alert posture, and half the squadron's aircraft were kept on alert.

In December 1965, Robert S. McNamara, Secretary of Defense announced a phaseout program that would further reduce SAC’s bomber force. This program called for the mid-1971 retirement of all B-58s and some Boeing B-52 Stratofortress models. With the removal of the B-58 from SAC's bomber force, the squadron was inactivated at the beginning of January 1970.

== Lineage ==
- Constituted as the 364th Bombardment Squadron (Heavy) on 28 June 1942

Activated on 1 March 1942
Redesignated 364th Bombardment Squadron, Heavy on 20 August 1943
Inactivated on 29 June 1946
Redesignated 364th Bombardment Squadron, Very Heavy on 11 June 1947
Activated on 1 July 1947
Inactivated on 6 September 1948
Redesignated 364th Bombardment Squadron, Medium on 20 December 1950
Activated on 2 January 1951
Inactivated on 1 January 1970 (Note: Despite the similar name, this squadron is not related to the Bombardment Squadron, Provisional, 364th, which was designated and organized at Anderson Air Force Base, Guam on 1 June 1972 and assigned to the Strategic Wing, Provisional, 72d and moved to U-Tapao Royal Thai Navy Airfield, Thailand on 1 July, where it was attached to the 307th Strategic Wing. This unit served to manage Boeing B-52 Stratofortress crews on temporary duty at U Tapao, flying Operation Arc Light combat missions over Indochina until 15 August 1973 when combat missions ended. It continued training operations until it stood down 30 June 1974, when it was discontinued.)

=== Assignments ===
- 305th Bombardment Group, 1 March 1942 – 29 June 1946
- 305th Bombardment Group, 1 July 1947 – 6 September 1948
- 305th Bombardment Group, 2 January 1951 (attached to 305th Bombardment Wing after 14 February 1951)
- 305th Bombardment Wing, 16 June 1952 – 1 January 1970

=== Stations ===
- Salt Lake City Army Air Base, Utah, 1 March 1942
- Geiger Field, Washington, 11 June 1942
- Muroc Army Air Field, California, 4 July 1942
- Fort Dix Army Air Base, New Jersey, 29 August-4 September 1942
- RAF Grafton Underwood (AAF-106), England, 13 September 1942
- RAF Chelveston (AAF-105), England, 11 December 1942
- Sint-Truiden Airfield (A-92), Belgium, 25 July 1945
- AAF Station Lechfeld (R-71), Germany, 19 December 1945 – 25 December 1946
- Andrews Field (later Andrews Air Force Base), Maryland, 1 July 1947 – 6 September 1948
- MacDill Air Force Base, Florida, 2 January 1951
- Bunker Hill Air Force Base (Later Grissom Air Force Base), Indiana, 1 June 1959 – 1 January 1970

=== Aircraft ===
- Boeing B-17 Flying Fortress, 1942–1946
- Douglas B-18 Bolo, 1942
- Consolidated B-24 Liberator, 1942
- Boeing B-29 Superfortress, 1951-1953
- Boeing B-47 Stratojet, 1952–1960
- Convair B-58 Hustler, 1960–1970

=== Awards and campaigns ===
Award streamer	Award	Dates	Notes
	Distinguished Unit Citation	4 April 1943	France,
	Distinguished Unit Citation	11 January 1944	Germany,
	Air Force Outstanding Unit Award	1 January 1954 – 1 March 1957	

Campaign Streamer	Campaign	Dates	Notes
	Air Combat, EAME Theater	13 September 1942–11 May 1945	
	Air Offensive, Europe	13 September 1942–5 June 1944	
	Normandy	6 June 1944–24 July 1944	
	Northern France	25 July 1944–14 September 1944	
	Rhineland	15 September 1944–21 March 1945	
	Ardennes-Alsace	16 December 1944–25 January 1945	
	Central Europe	22 March 1944–21 May 1945	

== See also ==
- B-17 Flying Fortress units of the United States Army Air Forces
- List of B-29 Superfortress operators
- List of B-47 units of the United States Air Force
