= 305th Operations Group =

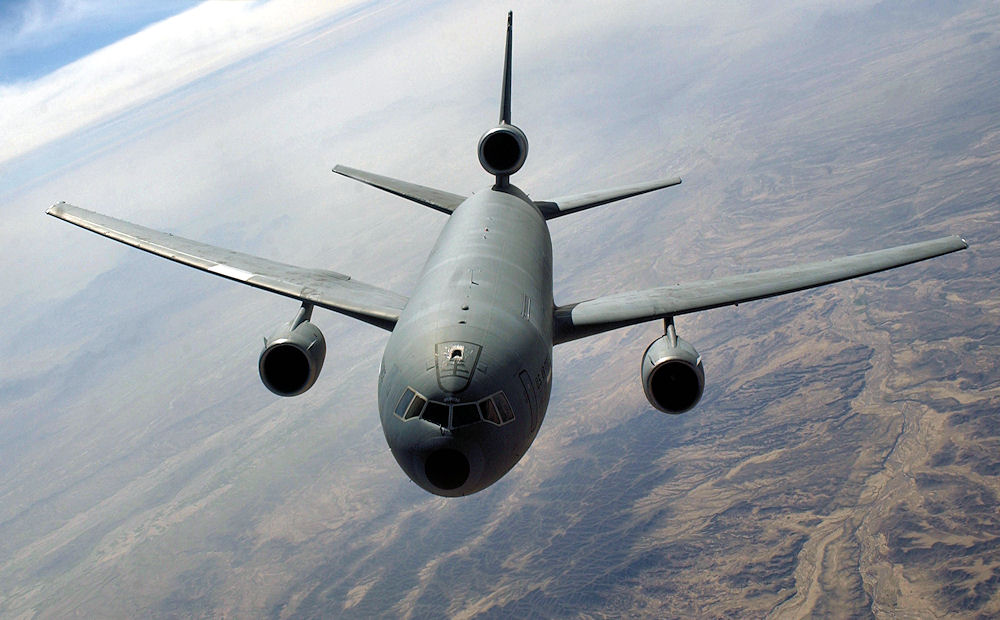
- Group KC-10 Extender after receiving fuel from a KC-135 Stratotanker over Afghanistan
- Active: 1942–1946; 1947–1948; 1950–1952; 1991–1993; 1994–present
- Country: United States
- Branch: United States Air Force
- Role: Airlift and Air Refueling
- Part of: Air Mobility Command
- Garrison/HQ: McGuire Air Force Base
- Motto(s): Can Do
- Engagements: European Theater of Operations
- Decorations: Distinguished Unit Citation; Air Force Outstanding Unit Award

Commanders
- Notable commanders: Curtis LeMay

Insignia
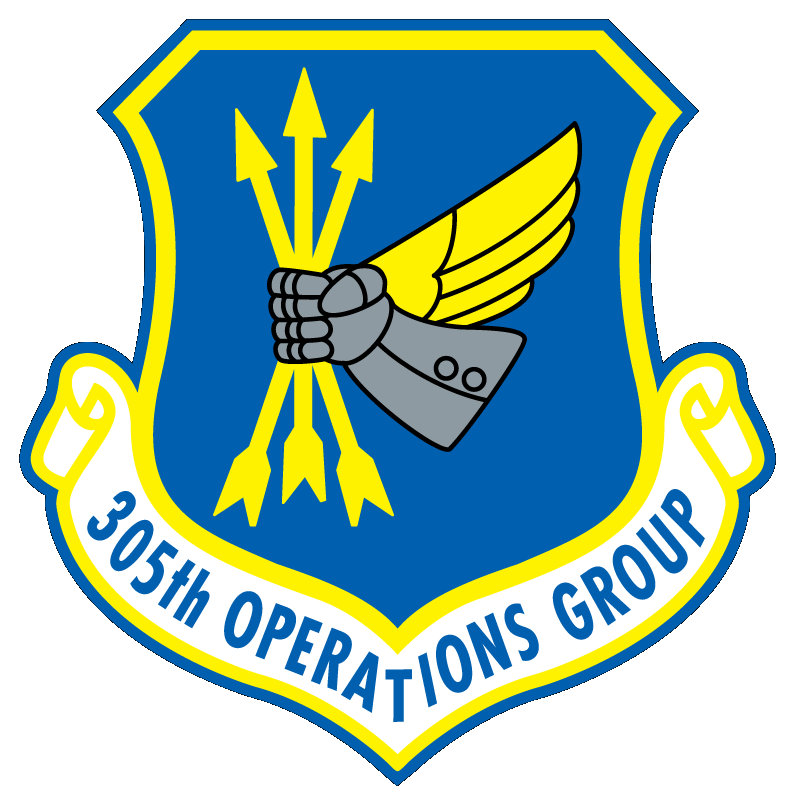
- 305 Operations Gp emblem (Note: The group uses the 305th Air Mobility Wing emblem with the group designation on the scroll. Kane, Factsheet, 305 Operations Group.)

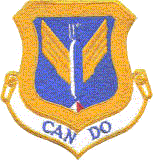
- 305th Bombardment Group emblem (approved 23 April 1951)

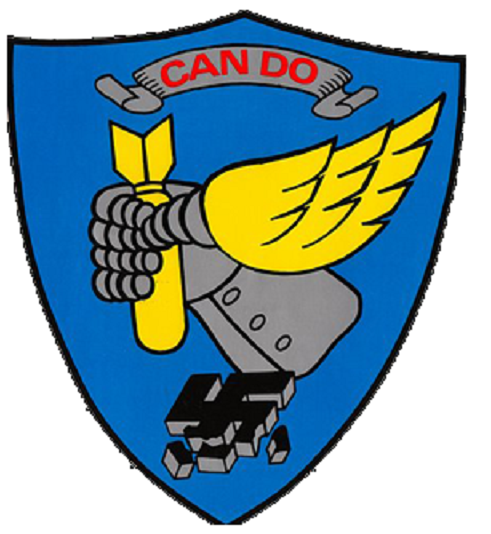
- 305th Bombardment Group emblem (World War II)

The 305th Operations Group is a United States Air Force unit assigned to the 305th Air Mobility Wing. It is stationed at the McGuire AFB entity of Joint Base McGuire-Dix-Lakehurst, New Jersey.

During World War II, the group's predecessor unit, the 305th Bombardment Group was one of the first VIII Bomber Command Boeing B-17 Flying Fortress units in England, and, was one of the most-decorated USAAF heavy-bombardment groups in the European Theater. 1st Lt William R. Lawley, Jr. and 1st Lt Edward S. Michael, pilots in the 364th Bomb Squadron, each received the Medal of Honor.

While commanded by Colonel Curtis LeMay the 305th Bomb Group pioneered many bomber flying formations and bombing procedures that became the standard operating procedures in the Eighth Air Force.

The group lost thirteen aircraft during the 14 October 1943 Schweinfurt mission, the heaviest loss of any group on the mission, and for this reason was given a Nazi flag found flying in the city as a war trophy when it was captured by U.S. troops in April 1945.

== Overview ==
The mission of the 305th Operations Group is to deploy worldwide from Air Mobility Command's Eastern Gateway, Joint Base McGuire-Dix-Lakehurst (JB MDL), to perform aerial-refueling and airlift missions, in support of tactical, strategic, reconnaissance, transport, and bombardment forces in high-threat and chemical-warfare environments.

The group flies the C-17 Globemaster III, KC-10 Extender, and KC-46 Pegasus in support of worldwide operations.

== Components ==
The group comprises the following squadrons:

- 2d Air Refueling Squadron (KC-46)
- 6th Airlift Squadron (C-17)

The 6th Airlift Squadron is the oldest airlift squadron in the Air Force, having served since 1 October 1933.

- 32d Air Refueling Squadron (KC-10)

The 32nd ARS can generate, mobilize and deploy KC-10 aircraft with more than 180 aircrew, maintenance and support people to fulfill a wide variety of worldwide mobility taskings.

- 305th Operations Support Squadron

The mission of the 305th OSS is to provide information, support, and equipment to allow aircrews to accomplish their global mobility mission.

== History ==
For additional history and lineage, see 305th Air Mobility Wing

=== World War II ===
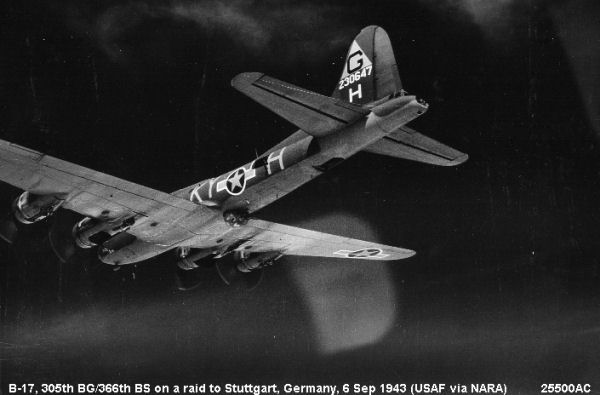
B-17F Flying Fortress of the 366th Bomb Squadron on a mission to Stuttgart, 6 September 1943 (Note: Aircraft is Boeing B-17F-115-BO Flying Fortress serial 42-30647. On 23 September 1943, this aircraft crashed at Chevelston returning from a mission, killing all on board.)

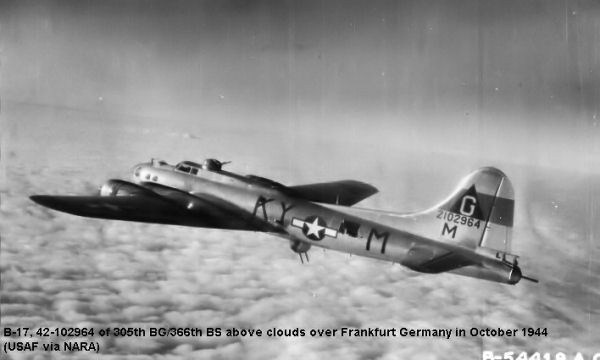
B-17G Flying Fortress of the 366th Bomb Squadron on a mission to Frankfurt in October 1944 (Note: Aircraft is Boeing B-17G-60-BO Flying Fortress serial 42-102964. This aircraft survived the war and was sent to Kingman Army Air Field Arizona on 4 December 1945 for storage.)

The 305th Bombardment Group was activated 1 March 1942 at Salt Lake City Army Air Base, Utah. The unit trained there before moving to Geiger Field, Washington on 11 June 1942. Received intensive training at Muroc Army Air Field, California beginning in July 1942.

The ground unit went by train to at Fort Dix Army Air Base, New Jersey. The ground unit sailed on the Queen Mary on 5 September 1942, and disembarked from Greenock on 12 September 1942. The aircraft assembled at Hancock Field, New York, and spent six weeks in advanced flight training. The unit received new Boeing B-17F Flying Fortress bombers, and left for the United Kingdom in October 1942 via Presque Isle Army Air Field and Gander Airport, to Prestwick Airport Scotland.

The 305th Bomb Group deployed to England in September 1942 and formed at RAF Grafton Underwood as part of VIII Bomber Command's 40th Bombardment Wing. Was assigned group tail code "Triangle-G". From Grafton Underwood, the group began combat on 17 November 1942 and attacked such targets as submarine pens, docks, harbours, shipyards, motor works, and marshalling yards in France, Germany, and the Low Countries. During December 1942, the group was transferred to RAF Chelveston.

On 27 January 1943, the group participated in the Eighth Air Force's first raid on Germany. During the winter of 1942–1943, the 305th was commanded by Colonel Curtis LeMay and pioneered many of the techniques of daylight bombing used by the USAAF over Nazi-controlled Europe.

The 305th Bomb Group bombed the navy yards at Wilhelmshaven on 27 January 1943 when heavy bombers of Eighth Air Force made their first penetration into Germany. Through mid-1943, the group attacked strategic targets such as submarine pens, docks, harbors, shipyards, motor works, and marshaling yards in France, Germany, and the Low Countries.

The 305th received the Distinguished Unit Citation for a mission in April 1943 when an industrial target in Paris was bombed with precision in spite of pressing enemy fighter attacks and heavy flak.

During the second half of 1943, the unit began deeper penetration into enemy territory to strike heavy industry. Significant objectives included aluminum, magnesium, and nitrate works in Norway, industries in Berlin, oil plants at Merseburg, aircraft factories at Anklam, shipping at Gdynia, and ball-bearing works at Schweinfurt.

A second Distinguished Unit Citation was awarded to the 305th for withstanding severe opposition to bombing aircraft factories in central Germany on 11 January 1944. The unit participated in the intensive campaign of heavy bombers against the German aircraft industry during "Big Week," 20–25 February 1944.

In addition to bombardment of strategic targets, the 305th Bomb Group often flew tactical interdictory missions and supported infantry units. Prior to the Normandy invasion in June 1944, it helped to neutralize enemy installations such as V-weapon sites, airfields, and repair shops. On D-Day, 6 June, the unit bombed enemy strongholds near the battle area. During the Battle of Normandy the 305th attacked enemy positions in advance of ground forces at Saint-Lô in July 1944 and struck antiaircraft batteries to cover the airborne invasion of the Netherlands in September.

After "Victory in Europe Day" (V-E Day), the 305th moved to Saint Trond Airfield, Belgium in July 1945 where it conducted photo-mapping flights which was called Project Casey Jones over Europe and North Africa. On 15 December 1945, the 305th moved to Lechfeld Airfield, Germany which it had bombed on 18 March 1944. The 364th Bomb Squadron was inactivated on 1 July 1946. The 423d Bombardment Squadron of the 306th Bombardment Group was attached to the group after this date but, by the end of October 1946, the group ceased all operations. Officially the unit was inactivated on 25 December 1946. On the Continent it was assigned to Ninth Air Force and inactivated on 15 November 1945.

=== Cold War ===
Not operational from 16 October to 25 December 1946. During two periods of activation (between July 1947 and September 1948, and, between January 1951 and June 1952), the group was manned only from 2 January to 9 February 1951 when SAC reorganized its wings into the dual deputate system.

=== Reactivation ===
On 1 September 1991, the 305th Operations Group activated under the "Objective Wing" concept adapted by the Air Force as the lines between tactical and strategic forces blurred. The flying components of the 305th Air Refueling Wing were reassigned to the newly established group.

The 1993 Base Realignment and Closure Commission directed realignment of Grissom Air Force Base, Indiana to the Air Force Reserve and the 305th OG phased out operations there in 1993. The Boeing KC-135R Stratotanker equipped 70th and 305th Air Refueling Squadrons were inactivated. In addition, the EC-135G/L radio relay aircraft as part of the PACCS system were also retired.

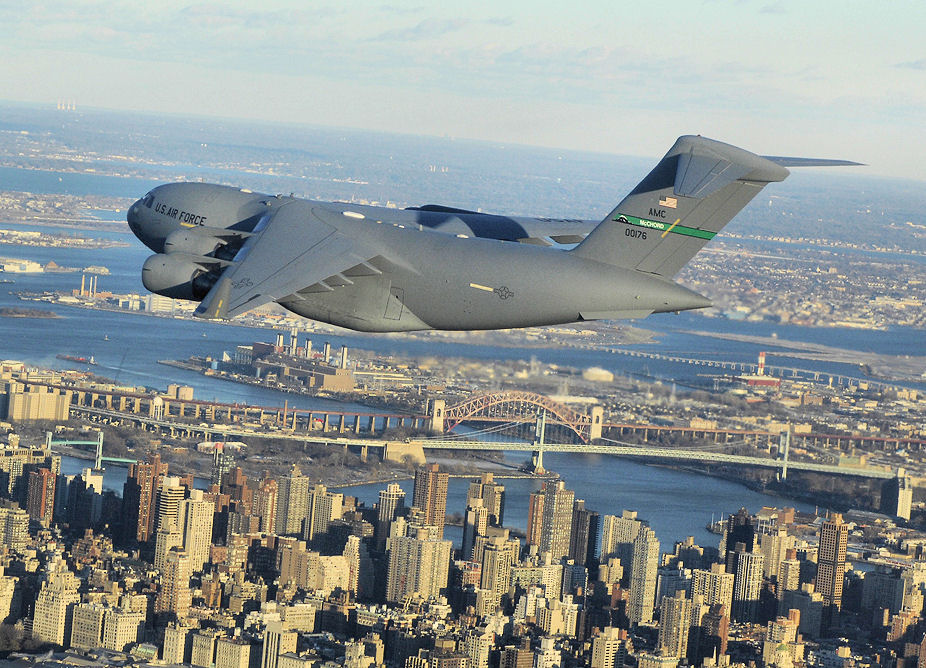
C-17 Globemaster III from McChord AFB flies over New York City after completing the first transcontinental flight on synthetic fuel to McGuire AFB

The 305th was reactivated at McGuire Air Force Base, New Jersey, replacing the 438th Operations Group on 1 October 1994. At McGuire, the group controls three squadrons of Boeing C-17A Globemaster III transports and McDonnell Douglas KC-10A Extender air refueling aircraft.

== Lineage ==
- Established as 305th Bombardment Group (Heavy) on 28 January 1942

Activated on 1 March 1942
Redesignated 305th Bombardment Group, Heavy on 20 August 1943
Inactivated on 25 December 1946

- Redesignated 305th Bombardment Group, Very Heavy on 11 June 1947

Activated on 1 July 1947
Inactivated on 6 September 1948

- Redesignated 305th Bombardment Group, Medium on 20 December 1950

Activated on 2 January 1951
Inactivated on 16 June 1952

- Redesignated 305th Operations Group on 29 August 1991

Activated on 1 September 1991
Inactivated on 15 October 1993

- Activated on 1 October 1994

=== Assignments ===
- II Bomber Command, 1 March 1942
- 16th Bombardment Wing, c. July – c. 23 August 1942
- VIII Bomber Command, 10 September 1942
- 1st Bombardment Wing (later 1 Combat Bombardment Wing), c. 12 September 1942 (attached to 102d Provisional Heavy Combat Bombardment Wing after 13 December 1942)
- 40th Combat Bombardment Wing, 16 September 1943
- 9th Air Division, 16 May 1945 (attached to Ninth Air Force for operational control)
- 98th Bombardment Wing, 15 September 1945
- 40th Bombardment Wing, c. 15 November 1945
- IX Air Force Service Command (later European Air Materiel Command), 20–25 December 1946
- Strategic Air Command, 1 July 1947 – 6 September 1948
- 305th Bombardment Wing, 2 January 1951 – 16 January 1952
- 305th Air Refueling Wing, 1 September 1991 – 15 October 1993
- 305th Air Mobility Wing, 1 October 1994 – present

=== Components ===
- 2d Air Refueling Squadron: 1 July 1995 – present
- 6th Airlift Squadron: 1 October 1994 – present
- 13th Airlift Squadron: 1 October 1994 – 31 March 2000
- 18th Airlift Squadron: 1 October 1994 – 1 July 1995
- 32d Air Refueling Squadron: 1 July 1995 – present
- 33d Reconnaissance Squadron (later 422d Bombardment Squadron): 1 March 1942 – 25 December 1946
- 46th Air Refueling Squadron: 1 June 1992 – 8 October 1993
- 70th Air Refueling Squadron: 1 September 1991 – 1 April 1993
- 305th Air Refueling Squadron: 2 July 1951 – 16 June 1952 (attached to 305th Bombardment Wing); 1 September 1991 – 20 August 1993
- 305th Operations Support Squadron, 1 September 1991 – 15 October 1993, 1 October 1994 – present
- 364th Bombardment Squadron: 1 March 1942 – 29 June 1946; 1 July 1947 – 6 September 1948; 2 January 1951 – 16 June 1952 (attached to 305th Bombardment Wing after 10 February 1951)
- 365th Bombardment Squadron: 1 March 1942 – 31 October 1946; 1 July 1947 – 6 September 1948; 2 January 1951 – 16 June 1952 (attached to 305th Bombardment Wing after 10 February 1951)
- 366th Bombardment Squadron: 1 March 1942 – 25 December 1946; 1 July 1947 – 6 September 1948; 2 January 1951 – 16 June 1952 (attached to 305th Bombardment Wing after 10 February 1951)
- 422nd Bombardment Squadron: attached 16 July – 25 December 1946
- 905th Air Refueling Squadron: 1 June 1992 – 1 July 1993
- 920th Air Refueling Squadron: 1 June – 30 September 1992

=== Stations ===
- Salt Lake City Army Air Base, Utah, 1 March 1942
- Geiger Field, Washington, 11 June 1942
- Muroc Army Air Field, California, 4 July 1942
- Fort Dix Army Air Base, New Jersey, 29 August – 4 September 1942
- RAF Grafton Underwood (AAF 106), England, 13 September 1942
- RAF Chelveston (AAF 105), England, 11 December 1942
- Saint Trond Airfield (A-92), Belgium, 25 July 1945
- Lechfeld Airfield (R-71), Germany, 19 December 1945 – 25 December 1946
- Andrews Field (later Andrews Air Force Base), Maryland, 1 July 1947 – 6 September 1948
- MacDill Air Force Base, Florida, 2 January 1951 – 16 June 1952
- Grissom Air Force Base, Indiana, 1 September 1991 – 15 October 1993
- McGuire Air Force Base (part of Joint Base McGuire-Dix-Lakehurst), New Jersey, 1 October 1994 – present

=== Aircraft assigned ===
- Boeing B-17 Flying Fortress, 1942–1946
- Douglas B-18 Bolo, 1942
- Consolidated B-24 Liberator, 1942
- Boeing B-29 Superfortress, 1951
- Boeing KC-135 Stratotanker, 1991–1993
- Boeing EC-135, 1991–1992
- Lockheed C-141 Starlifter, 1994–2004
- McDonnell Douglas KC-10 Extender, 1995–present
- Beechcraft C-12 Huron, 1994–1995
- Boeing C-17 Globemaster III, 2004–present
