= RAF Chelveston =

British Royal Air Force station (1940–1962)

RAF Chelveston USAAF Station 105
- Chelveston, Northamptonshire in England
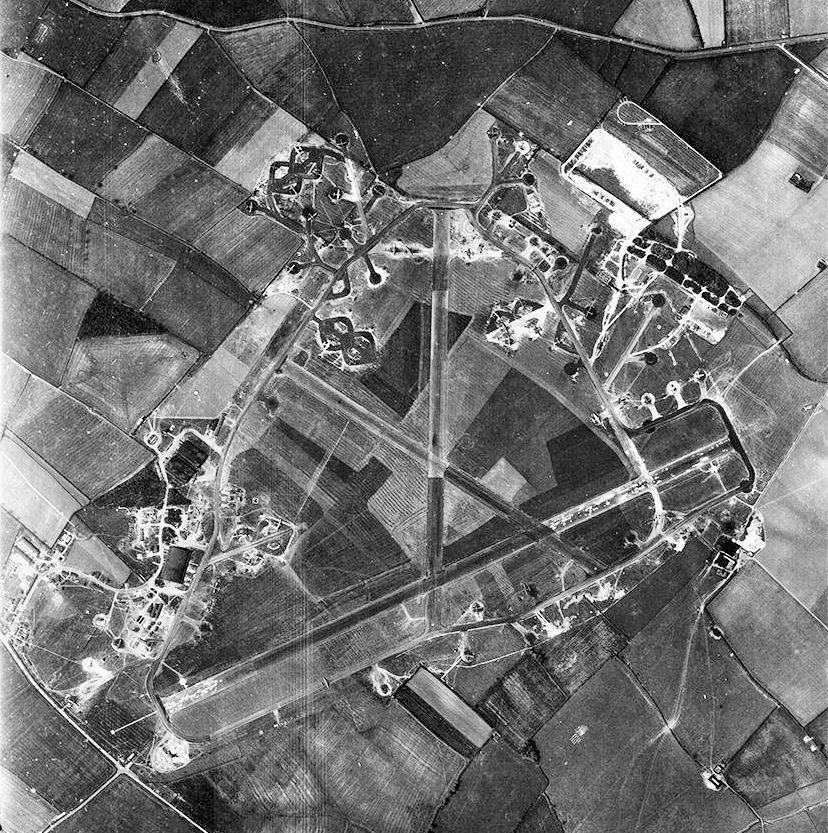
- Aerial photograph of RAF Chelveston, oriented north, 9 May 1944

Site information
- Type: Royal Air Force station
- Owner: Air Ministry
- Operator: Royal Air Force; United States Army Air Forces; United States Air Force
- Controlled by: Eighth Air Force

Location
- Shown within Northamptonshire RAF Chelveston (the United Kingdom)
- Coordinates: 52°18′06″N 000°32′00″W
- Grid reference: TL015685

Site history
- Built: 1940
- In use: 1940 - 1962
- Battles/wars: European theatre of World War II

Airfield information
Runways
| Direction | Length and surface |
|---|---|
| 00/00 | Concrete |
| 00/00 | Concrete |
| 00/00 | Concrete |

Royal Air Force Chelveston or more simply RAF Chelveston is a former Royal Air Force station located on the south side of the B645 (former A45 road), 5 miles (8.0 km) east of Wellingborough, near the village of Chelveston in Northamptonshire, England. During the Second World War the airfield was occupied by both the Royal Air Force and the United States Army Air Forces. It was given the USAAF designation Station 105.

During the Cold War, Chelveston housed some flying units but its main role was that of a readiness station to receive USAF units from the United States in case of an emergency. In the mid-1970s, the majority of the airfield was sold by the Ministry of Defence to private landholders, with the exception of a military housing area occupied by U.S. service members assigned to RAF Alconbury and RAF Molesworth.

== Origins ==
Construction of Chelveston began in 1940 with short grass runways and three hangars grouped together. The airfield opened in August 1941 as an RAF station.

It was first used for the Central Gunnery School between 5 December 1941 and 1 April 1942, then by A Flight of the Airborne Forces Experimental Establishment between 6 May and 5 June 1942, took over with its gliders.

The grass landing strips were deemed unsuitable for heavy 4-engine bombers, so concrete runways were constructed along with taxiways and hardstands. The airfield was upgraded to Class A airfield standards before being used by the U.S. Eighth Air Force as a heavy bomber airfield.

== United States Army Air Forces use ==
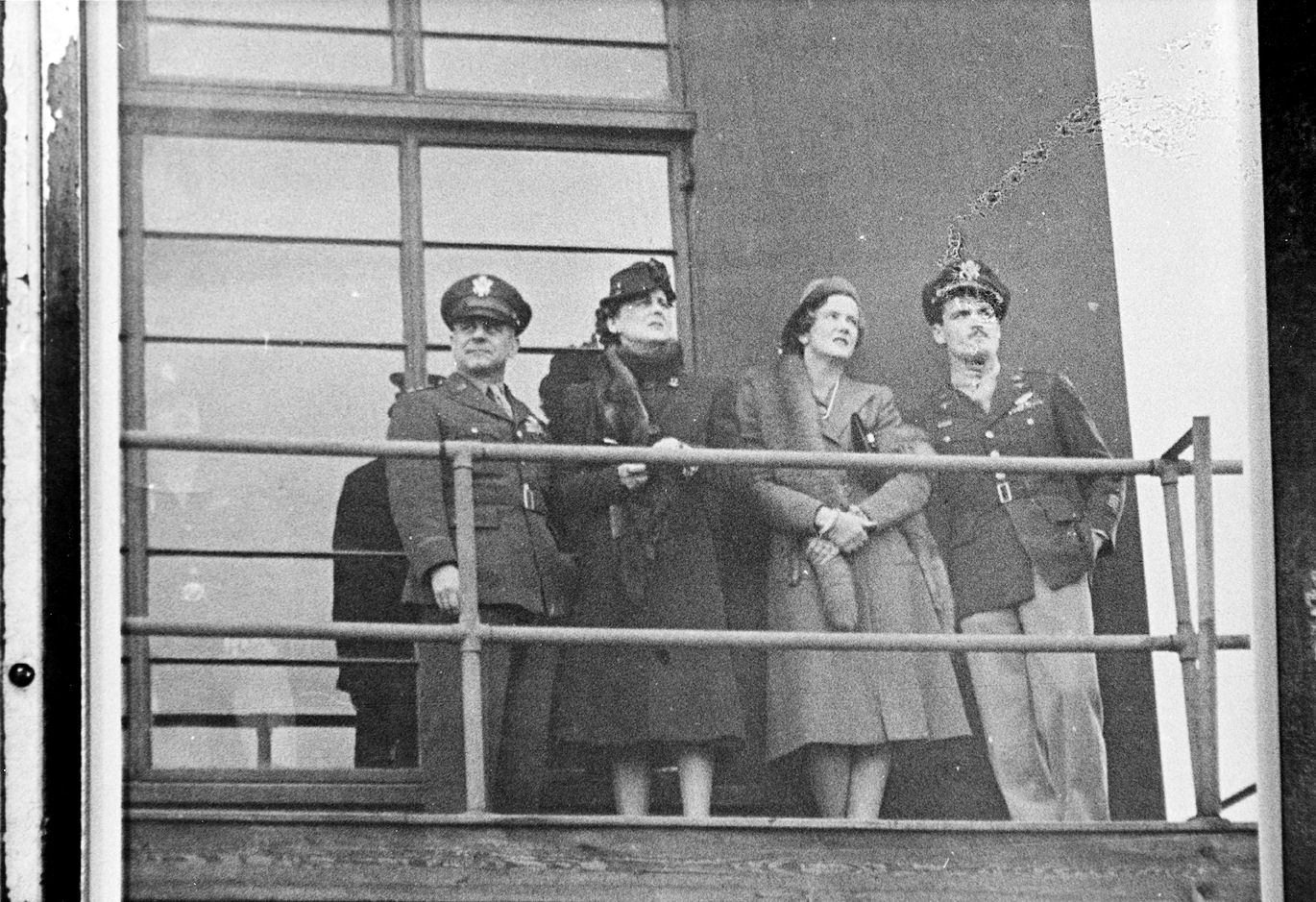
Lt Gen Jimmy Doolittle, commander of the 8th Air Force; the Duchess of Kent; Lady Herbert; and Col Henry G. "Mac" MacDonald, commander of the 305 BG, on the control tower at Chelveston, 4 Apr 1945

USAAF Station Units assigned to RAF Chelveston were:

- 442nd Sub-Depot
- 18th Weather Squadron
- 2d Station Complement Squadron
- 1059th Military Police Company
- 1632nd Ordnance Supply & Maintenance Company
- 876th Chemical Company (Air Operations)
- 2030th Engineer Fire Fighting Platoon
- 5th Mobile Training Unit
- 309th Medical Dispensary

=== 60th Troop Carrier Group ===
In early 1942, Chelveston was turned over to the American Eighth Air Force. The first USAAF unit to occupy Chelveston was the 60th Troop Carrier Group. The 60th consisted of the 10th, 11th, 12th and 26th squadrons, equipped with 53 Douglas C-47 Skytrain aircraft.

The 60th arrived in early July, but its stay was brief, moving to RAF Aldermaston at the end of the month. After its training in the UK, the unit moved on to the 12th Air Force for operations in the Mediterranean theater.

=== 301st Bombardment Group (Heavy) ===
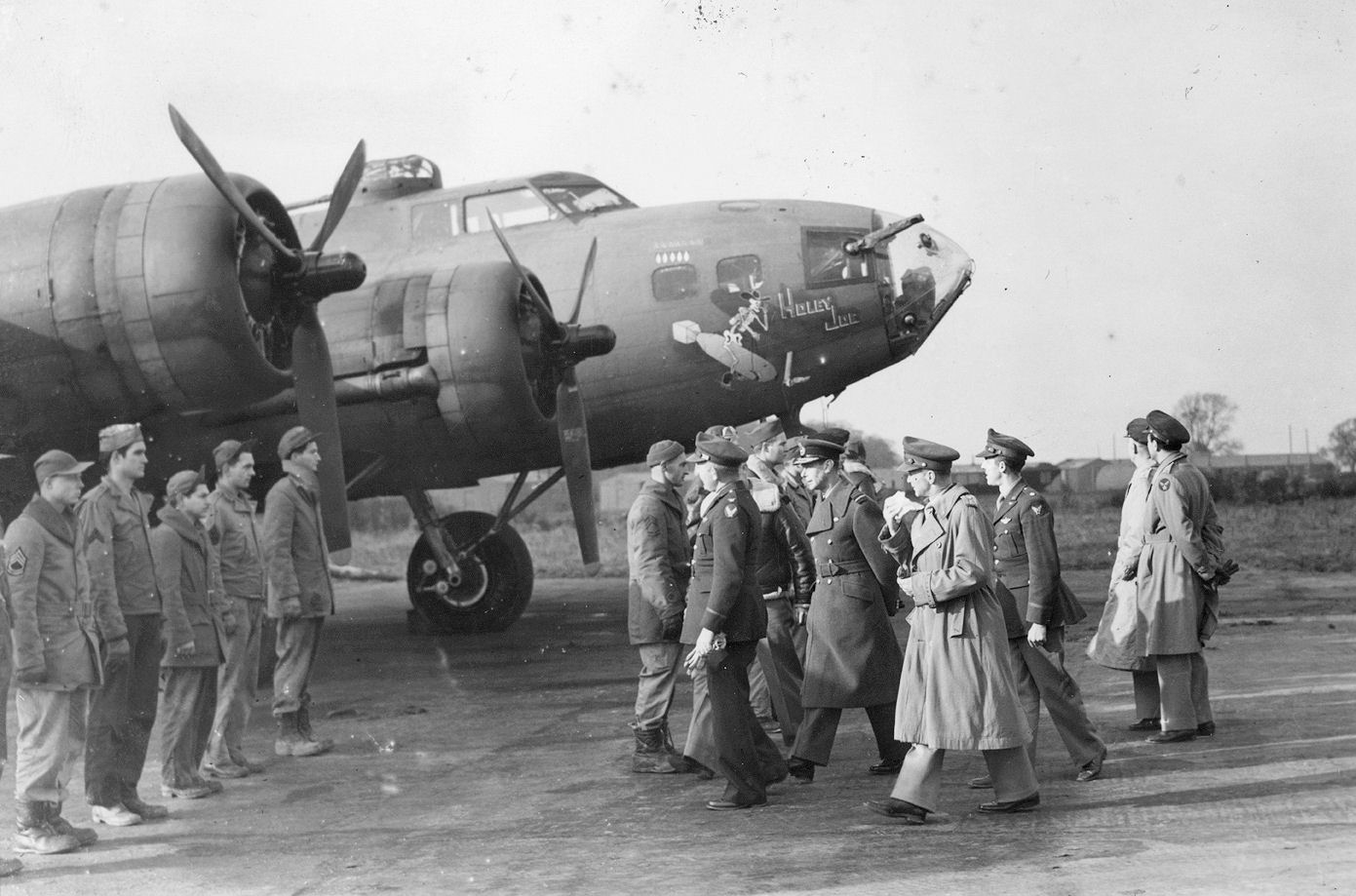
King George VI passes a B-17 Flying Fortress (AAF Serial Number 41-24352) nicknamed "Holey Joe" as he meets personnel of the 301st Bomb Group during a royal visit to Chelveston on 14 November 1942.

On 9 August 1942, the 301st Bombardment Group (Heavy) took up residence on the station. The 301st was assigned to the 1st Combat Wing at Brampton Grange. Its operational squadrons were the 32d, 352d, 353d, 354th and 415th Bomb Squadrons, each equipped with Boeing B-17 Flying Fortresses.

The unit was the second heavy USAAF bomber group to arrive in England. It flew its first operational mission on 5 September 1942 to the Rouen marshalling yards in northern France. During its stay at Chelveston, the unit attacked submarine pens, airfields, railroads, bridges and other targets on the continent, primarily in France.

The 301st BG was allocated to Operation Torch, and on 26 November 1942 it departed for the Twelfth Air Force, being moved to Tafaraoui Airfield, Algeria.

=== 305th Bombardment Group (Heavy) ===
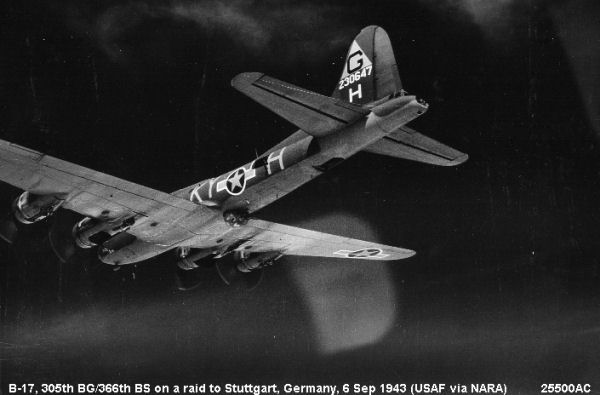
Flying Fortress, serial 42-30647 of the 366th BS on a mission to Stuttgart, 6 September 1943. On 23 September 1943, it crashed at Chelveston returning from a mission, killing all on board.

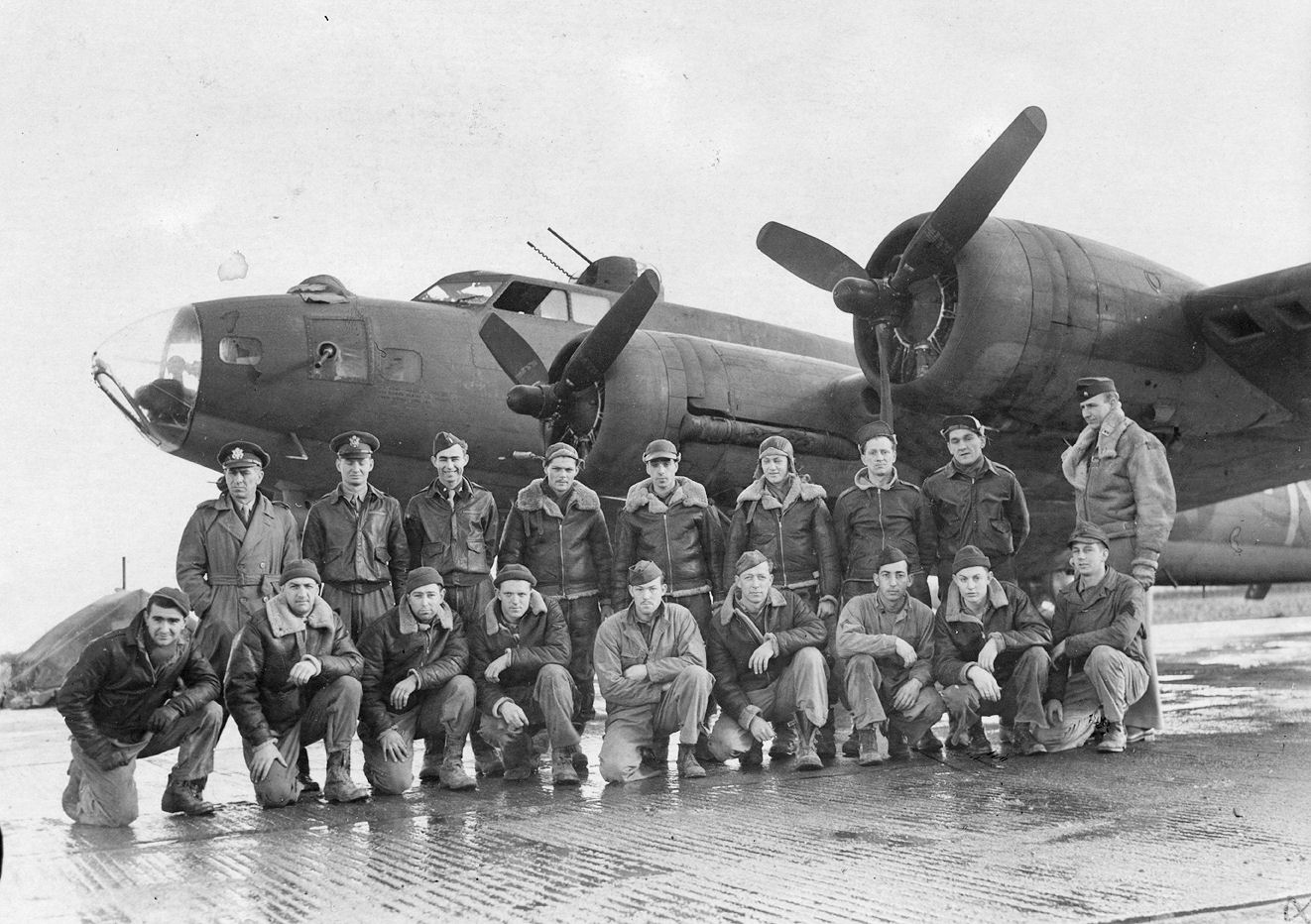
Bomber crew and ground crew of the 305th Bomb Group with their B-17 Flying Fortress after the first daylight raid on Nazi Germany

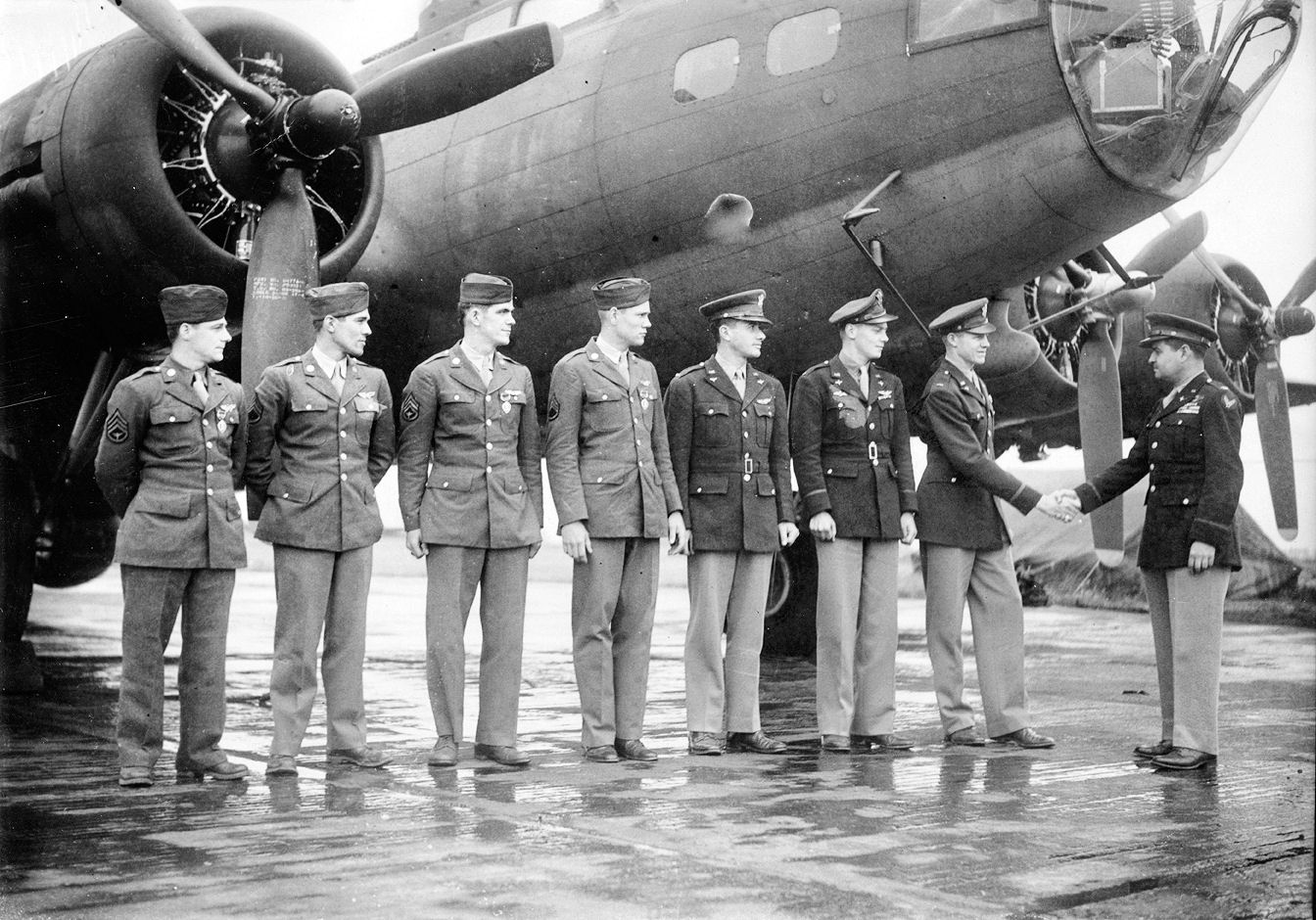
Colonel Curtis LeMay officially congratulates a bomber crew of the 305th Bomb Group in front of their B-17 Flying Fortress.

The next group to use Chelveston was the 305th Bombardment Group (Heavy), moving in from RAF Grafton Underwood in December 1942. The 305th Bomb Group was one of the most decorated USAAF bomb groups in the European Theater.

The 305th BG was assigned to the 40th Combat Wing at RAF Thurleigh. The group tail code was a "Triangle G". Its operational squadrons (and fuselage codes) were the 364th(WF), 365th (XK), 366th (KY) and 422d (JJ) Bomb Squadrons, each initially equipped with B-17Fs, then upgraded to the B-17G in 1944.

During the winter of 1942/43, the 305th was commanded by Colonel Curtis LeMay and pioneered many of the techniques of daylight bombing used by the USAAF over Nazi-controlled Europe. These fundamental procedures and techniques were later adapted to the Boeing B-29 Superfortress which fought in the Pacific.

The 305th BG bombed the navy yards at Wilhelmshaven on 27 January 1943 when heavy bombers of Eighth AF made their first penetration into Germany. Through mid–1943, the group attacked strategic targets as submarine pens, docks, harbours, shipyards, motor works, and marshalling yards in France, Germany, and the Low Countries.

The 305th BG received the Distinguished Unit Citation for a mission in April 1943 when an industrial target in Paris was bombed with precision in spite of pressing enemy fighter attacks and heavy flak.

During the second half of 1943, the unit began deeper penetration into enemy territory to strike heavy industry. Significant objectives included aluminum, magnesium, and nitrate works in Norway, industries in Berlin, oil plants at Merseburg, aircraft factories at Anklam, shipping at Gdynia, and ball-bearing works at Schweinfurt.

First Lieutenants William R. Lawley Jr. and Edward S. Michael, pilots in the 364th Bomb Squadron, each received the Medal of Honor for similar performances on 20 February and 11 April 1944, respectively. In each case a B-17 was severely damaged by fighters after it had bombed a target in Germany, crew members were wounded, and the pilot himself was critically injured; recovering in time to pull his aircraft out of a steep dive, and realising that the wounded men would be unable to bail out, each pilot flew his plane back to England and made a successful crash landing.

A second Distinguished Unit Citation was awarded to the 305th for withstanding severe opposition to bomb aircraft factories in central Germany on 11 January 1944. The unit participated in the intensive campaign of heavy bombers against the German aircraft industry during Big Week, 20–25 February 1944.

In addition to bombardment of strategic targets, the 305th BG often flew tactical interdictory missions and supported infantry units. Prior to the invasion of Normandy in June 1944, it helped to neutralize enemy installations such as V-weapon sites, airfields, and repair shops. On 6 June, the unit bombed enemy strongholds near the battle area. During the Battle of Normandy the 305th attacked enemy positions in advance of ground forces at Saint-Lô in July 1944 and struck anti-aircraft batteries to cover the Operation Market-Garden airborne invasion of the Netherlands in September.

The 422nd Bomb Squadron became a specialist unit in the summer of 1943, taking part in experimental night bombing missions with the B-17 and carrying out leaflet dropping sorties in the darkness. In 1944, the squadron extended its activities to pathfinder techniques using the H2X airborne radar.

The 305th took part in the Battle of the Bulge, December 1944 − January 1945, by bombing military installations in the battle zone, and supported the airborne assault across the Rhine in March 1945.

After V-E Day, the 305th moved to St Trond Airfield, in Belgium in July 1945 and Chelveston was returned to the RAF in October 1945.

== Postwar era ==
In the immediate aftermath of the Second World War, Chelveston was placed into "care and maintenance" status by the RAF and became a satellite field for No. 25 Maintenance Unit RAF.

20th Century Fox film crews shot the opening sequence of the film Twelve O'Clock High at Chelveston. In these scenes, an American AAF veteran played by Dean Jagger returns to "Archbury" (Chelveston), the home station for his bomb group. The airfield is mostly deserted, except for the occasional cow, but the control tower, huts and hangars still remain as ruined yet evocative reminders of what was once his home away from home.

== United States Air Force use ==
With the Korean War and the growing threat of the Soviet Union, the US and UK agreed to an expanded US military presence in the United Kingdom. On 1 December 1952, Chelveston returned to American control.

=== Strategic Air Command ===
In 1952, RAF Chelveston was allocated to the United States Air Force. The USAF planned to use Chelveston as an advanced Operation Reflex base for forward deployment of the new Boeing B-47 Stratojet medium range nuclear bomber. Strategic Air Command wanted to disperse its nuclear bomber force and have about half of its B-47s stationed at forward bases in Western Europe and North Africa. Because the borders of the Soviet Union and Warsaw Pact controlled areas were within the range of the B-47, the Reflex deployments would base the bombers for 90-day rotations of crews and aircraft.

United States Air Forces in Europe (USAFE), however, managed the initial reconstruction of the airfield, through the 7503d Air Services Wing. The base was reconstructed, and a completely new 11,000 ft (3,400 m) jet runway was constructed on the airfield to accommodate intercontinental bombers. Wartime buildings in disrepair were replaced with new facilities. Starting in November 1955, Chelveston was transferred to the SAC 7530th Air Base Squadron, 7th Air Division as a standby facility.

The Boeing B-47 Stratojet was a familiar sight at Chelveston as wings deployed on 90-day rotations. Two of the SAC B-47 Wings which deployed to Chelveston were the 301st Bombardment Wing from Lockbourne AFB, Ohio, and the 305th Bombardment Wing from MacDill Air Force Base, Florida, direct descendants of the two Second World War B-17 Bombardment groups assigned to the airfield. In 1958, the church of St James in Thrapston received the pews which had previously been installed in the Chelveston chapel.

=== United States Air Forces in Europe ===
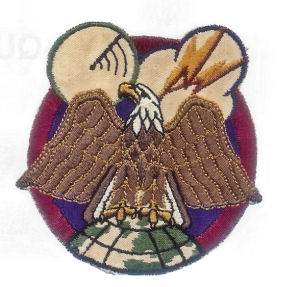
Emblem of the 42nd Tactical Reconnaissance Squadron

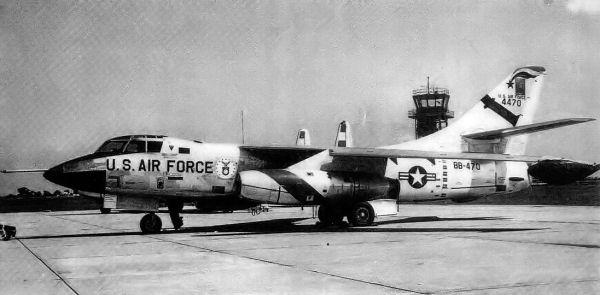
1960 photo of Douglas RB-66C-DT Destroyer, AF Serial No. 54-470 of the 42nd TRS/10th TRW at RAF Chelveston. This aircraft was used during the Vietnam War and was eventually scrapped at Kadena AB, Okinawa in 1973.

Following French President General de Gaulle's requirement for all foreign nuclear forces to leave France, there was a major readjustment of USAF deployments in Western Europe, and the B-47 deployments ended. On 1 September 1959, jurisdiction of Chelveston was transferred from SAC to USAFE. Control of the base was assigned to the 10th Tactical Reconnaissance Wing at RAF Alconbury, which had been moved from West Germany to England. The 10th TRW could not accommodate all four squadrons of the wing at Alconbury, so one was based at Chelveston, which became its satellite. The mission was changed to support Douglas RB-66C Destroyer Reconnaissance aircraft of the 42nd Tactical Reconnaissance Squadron. The first RB-66s arrived at the base on 26 August and by mid-18 September all were present. The squadron's activities consisted of specialized electronic reconnaissance and electronic countermeasures.

The 42nd TRS remained at Chelveston for almost three years until the summer of 1962. At that time, it was decided to forward deploy the squadron to the then-unused Toul-Rosières Air Base, France.

After the B-66s departed, the base was returned to reserve status. The RAF used Chelveston for Civil Defence exercises. Mostly though, the station was maintained by a small RAF skeleton support staff. In August 1968, the station was put on alert during the Czechoslovak Crisis, but no units were deployed there.

U.S. servicemen were encouraged and assisted to pursue hobbies and use the station workshops. Chelveston and Alconbury servicemen often built and raced stock cars, and especially in the 1960s were famous around English race tracks for their building and racing skills and for their access to American-built V-8 engines.

== Draw-down and closure ==
In the early 1970s, due to budget cutbacks, the MOD decided to close Chelveston. The concrete runways, taxiways and hardstands were broken up and removed in 1977, with large quantities of aggregate being supplied to various construction projects in the Northamptonshire and Bedfordshire markets. The ground station, with large numbers of nissen huts and other buildings erected during World War II and during the 1950s were also all demolished, including the removal of streets and other infrastructure. Although unused since the early 1960s, most of these structures were in relatively good condition at the time of their removal. Other parts of the base were sold to private agricultural interests, with the exception of some housing units retained by the USAF for families of personnel assigned to RAF Molesworth and a small school. These homes may have been sold by the MOD in recent years, due to the reduced number of American military personnel in the areas. The large J-Type hangar was retained by the 10th TRW at RAF Alconbury for storage of War Reserve Material (WRM) assets until the late 1980s. It was demolished after the closure of the Alconbury flightline.

An RAF high frequency signals facility was established on the former airfield site in 1977, operated by RAF No. 81 Signals Unit and with a large array of antennas (part of UK STCICS). The site incorporated a microwave relay mast linking the site with the MOD in London and RAF Strike Command in High Wycombe. One mast was of 600W power that transmitted RAF VOLMET on 5.450 MHz USB and 11.253 MHz USB. The station closed in December 2003 when the RAF's high frequency communications system was replaced by the Defence High Frequency Communications Service.

== Post military use ==
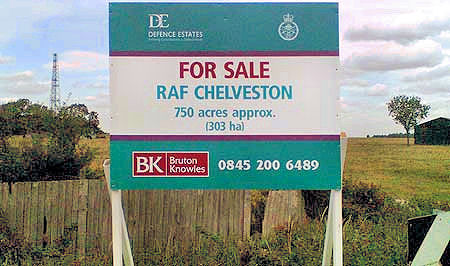
2005 sign offering the remainder of RAF Chelveston for sale

In late 2005, RAF Chelveston were sold by Defence Estates to a businessman who is in the process of developing it into Chelveston Renewable Energy Park. In May 2007, a new memorial to the men that served at the RAF station during the Second World War was unveiled in their memory by some of their comrades.

Almost nothing of the former airfield remains, although some evidence of the wartime airfield can still be seen in aerial imagery.

- The imprint of the 11,000' postwar jet runway (03/21), is clearly visible in aerial imagery. Numerous small pieces of concrete in the grass can also be seen along the outlines of the former SAC runway. The World War II runways, taxiways, hardstands and perimeter track, much of which was abandoned but still in existence during Chelveston's postwar use by SAC and USAFE were also completely removed and no evidence of them can be seen. The 1977 removal of these facilities was very complete and thorough. The postwar SAC taxiway was reduced from 100' wide to approximately 20 ft to create an access road for the RAF signals facility. The EOR taxiway turnoff on the 03 runway end can still be seen as an imprint in the grass.
- The foundation of the J-type hangar, used by RAF Alconbury for storage can be seen. A large pile of rubble is piled in the southeast corner and what the concrete foundation and remaining taxiway ends of concrete have various objects being piled on them.
- One of the foundations of a former T2 hangar is also visible, just to the southwest being an intact wartime building along the access road.
- The foundation of the wartime control tower can be seen as a disturbance on the grass
- Remains of the bomb dump
- An intact wartime building; additional foundations are just to the southwest of the USAF housing area

== See also ==
- List of former Royal Air Force stations
- Yelden
