= William R. Lawley Jr. =

United States Air Force Medal of Honor recipient (1920–1999)

William Robert Lawley Jr.
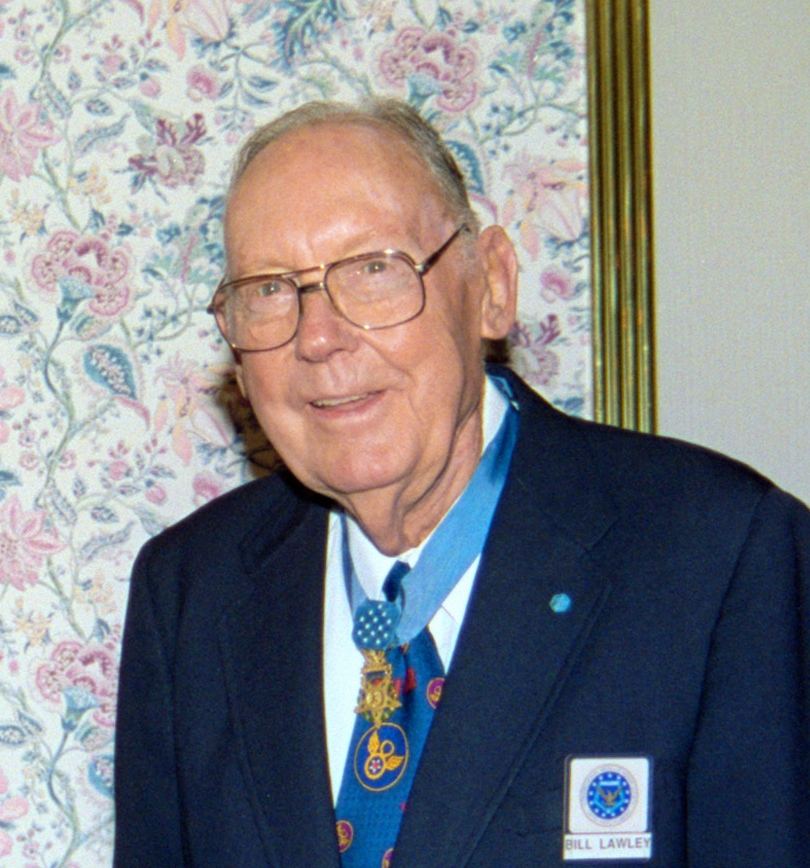
- Lawley in 1997
- Born: August 23, 1920; Leeds, Alabama, U.S.
- Died: May 30, 1999 (aged 78); Montgomery, Alabama
- Burial place: Greenwood Cemetery, Montgomery, Alabama, U.S.
- Military career
- Allegiance: United States of America
- Branch: United States Air Force
- Service years: 1942 - 1972
- Rank: Colonel
- Units: 364th Bombardment Squadron, 305th Bomb Group (Heavy)
- Commands: 55th Air Refueling Squadron
- Conflicts: World War II
- Awards: Medal of Honor; Legion of Merit; Purple Heart; Air Medal (2)

William Robert Lawley Jr. (August 23, 1920 – May 30, 1999) was a United States Army Air Forces officer and a recipient of the United States military's highest decoration—the Medal of Honor—for his actions in World War II.

== Early life ==
Born in 1920 in Leeds, Alabama, Lawley graduated from high school in his hometown in 1938.

== Military career ==
Lawley joined the Army Air Forces from Birmingham, Alabama in April 1942, and earned his wings and commission at Altus, Oklahoma, in April 1943.

=== World War II ===
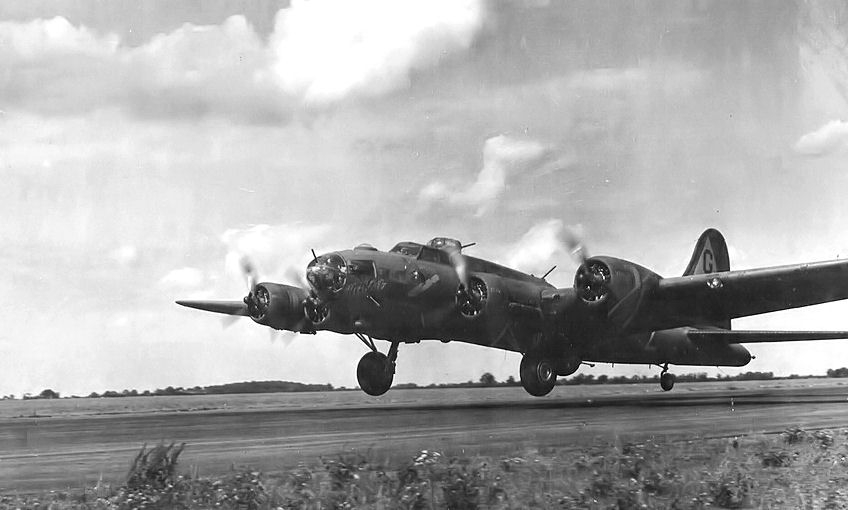
305th BG B-17

By February 20, 1944, Lawley was a first lieutenant serving as a pilot in the 364th Bomb Squadron, 305th Bomb Group. On that day, during a bombing mission over Nazi-controlled Europe, his B-17 Flying Fortress came under attack by enemy fighter aircraft. With his plane severely damaged and on fire, he ordered his crew to parachute to safety. Finding that two crewmen were too badly injured to bail out, Lawley chose to remain in the aircraft and, despite his own serious wounds, attempt to pilot it into friendly territory. Although weakened from loss of blood and shock, he was able to make a successful crash landing in England. Lawley recovered from his wounds and, on August 8, 1944, was awarded the Medal of Honor.

Lawley flew 14 combat missions until June 1944 as a first lieutenant. He returned to the United States in September 1944, serving as a public relations officer at Hendricks Army Airfield in Florida. Promoted to captain in January 1945, he completed the public relations course at Craig Field in Alabama and the Air Tactical School at Tyndall Air Force Base in Florida, serving during part of this time as aide to Gen. Muir Fairchild at Maxwell Field in Alabama.

=== Post war ===
He went to HQ United States Air Force in the Pentagon as administrative assistant to Maj. Gen. David Schlatter in a special weapons assignment, with promotion to major in August 1949.

In February 1950, he held special assignments to the commanding general of Air Research and Development Command, completing the Navy Language School at Fort Myer, Virginia, and the Strategic Intelligence School in Washington, D.C. After being promoted to lieutenant colonel, he served as an assistant air attaché to Brazil, serving until 1954. Upon his return to the United States, he attended the Air Command and Staff School at Maxwell Air Force Base in Alabama, and on graduation was assigned as commander of the 55th Air Refueling Squadron at Forbes Air Force Base in Kansas. He continued to serve at Forbes AFB as Aircrew Maintenance Staff Officer for the 21st Air Division, and later as Deputy Base Commander and Deputy Vice Commander of the 815th Combat Support Group.

Lawley was promoted to colonel on March 27, 1959. In January 1963, he became Assistant Phase Chief Director of Curricular at the Air War College at Maxwell AFB. He retired from the Air Force at the rank of colonel in 1972.

== Later life ==
Lawley and his wife Amy had two daughters and one son, and five grandchildren.

He died at age 78 due to complications from pneumonia in Montgomery, Alabama He was buried in Greenwood Cemetery, Montgomery, Alabama.

== Medal of Honor citation ==
Lawley's official Medal of Honor citation reads:

For conspicuous gallantry and intrepidity in action above and beyond the call of duty, 20 February 1944, while serving as pilot of a B-17 aircraft on a heavy bombardment mission over enemy-occupied continental Europe. Coming off the target he was attacked by approximately 20 enemy fighters, shot out of formation, and his plane severely crippled. Eight crewmembers were wounded, the copilot was killed by a 20-mm. shell. One engine was on fire, the controls shot away, and 1st Lt. Lawley seriously and painfully wounded about the face. Forcing the copilot's body off the controls, he brought the plane out of a steep dive, flying with his left hand only. Blood covered the instruments and windshield and visibility was impossible. With a full bomb load the plane was difficult to maneuver and bombs could not be released because the racks were frozen. After the order to bail out had been given, 1 of the waist gunners informed the pilot that 2 crewmembers were so severely wounded that it would be impossible for them to bail out. With the fire in the engine spreading, the danger of an explosion was imminent. Because of the helpless condition of his wounded crewmembers 1st Lt. Lawley elected to remain with the ship and bring them to safety if it was humanly possible, giving the other crewmembers the option of bailing out. Enemy fighters again attacked but by using masterful evasive action he managed to lose them. One engine again caught on fire and was extinguished by skillful flying. 1st Lt. Lawley remained at his post, refusing first aid until he collapsed from sheer exhaustion caused by loss of blood, shock, and the energy he had expended in keeping control of his plane. He was revived by the bombardier and again took over the controls. Coming over the English coast 1 engine ran out of gasoline and had to be feathered. Another engine started to burn and continued to do so until a successful crash landing was made on a small fighter base. Through his heroism and exceptional flying skill, 1st Lt. Lawley rendered outstanding distinguished and valorous service to our Nation.

== Awards and decorations ==

Badge	USAF Command pilot badge		
1st row	Medal of Honor		Legion of Merit
2nd row	Purple Heart	Air Medal with oak leaf cluster	Presidential Unit Citation
3rd row	Air Force Outstanding Unit Award with oak leaf cluster	American Campaign Medal	European–African–Middle Eastern Campaign Medal with two campaign stars
4th Row	World War II Victory Medal	National Defense Service Medal with service star	Air and Space Longevity Service Award with six oak leaf clusters.

== See also ==
- List of Medal of Honor recipients for World War II
