= 377th Division =

377th Division may refer to:

- 377th Infantry Division, Wehrmacht, Germany
- 377th Rifle Division, Soviet Union

== See also ==
- List of military divisions by number
- 377th (disambiguation)
