= 377th =

377th may refer to:

- 377th Air Base Wing, wing of the United States Air Force based at Kirtland Air Force Base, New Mexico
- 377th Bombardment Group, first constituted at Fort Dix Army Air Base New Jersey in 1942
- 377th Field Artillery Regiment, field artillery regiment of the United States Army
  - 1st Battalion, 377th Field Artillery Regiment
  - 2nd Battalion, 377th Field Artillery Regiment
- 377th Fighter Squadron, inactive United States Air Force unit
- 377th Theater Sustainment Command (TSC), unit of the US Army
- 377th Troop Carrier Squadron, inactive United States Air Force unit

== See also ==
- 377 (number)
- 377, the year 377 (CCCLXXVII) of the Julian calendar
- 377 BC
