= 309th Maintenance Wing =

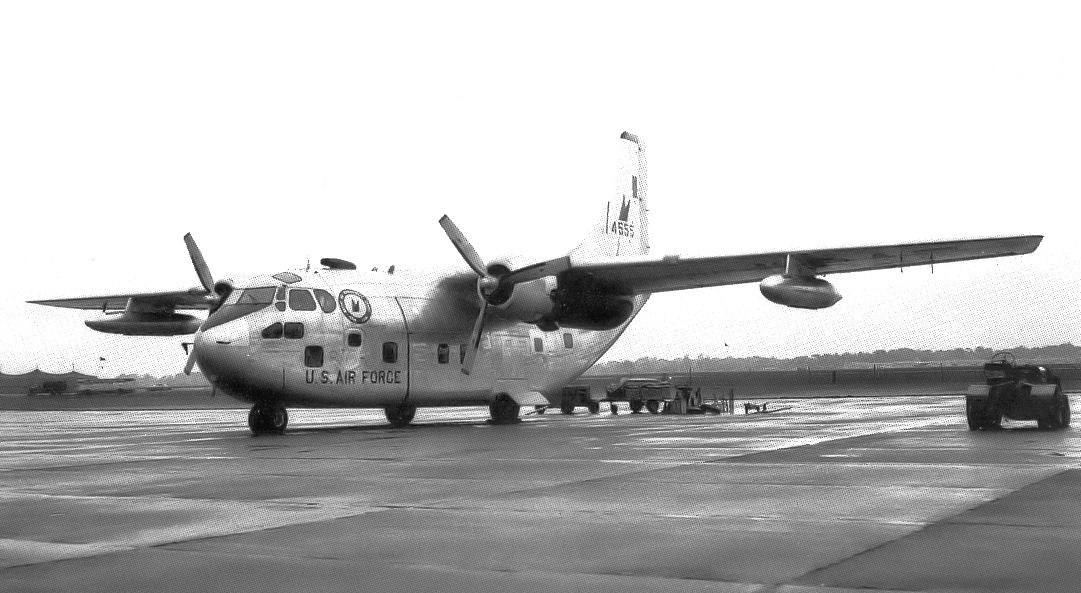
- 309th Troop Carrier Group C-123 Provider (Note: Aircraft is Fairchild C-123B-2-FA Provider serial 54-555.)
- Active: 1942–1944, 1949-1951, 1955-1957, 2005-2012
- Country: United States
- Branch: United States Air Force
- Role: Equipment support
- Decorations: Air Force Outstanding Unit Award

Insignia
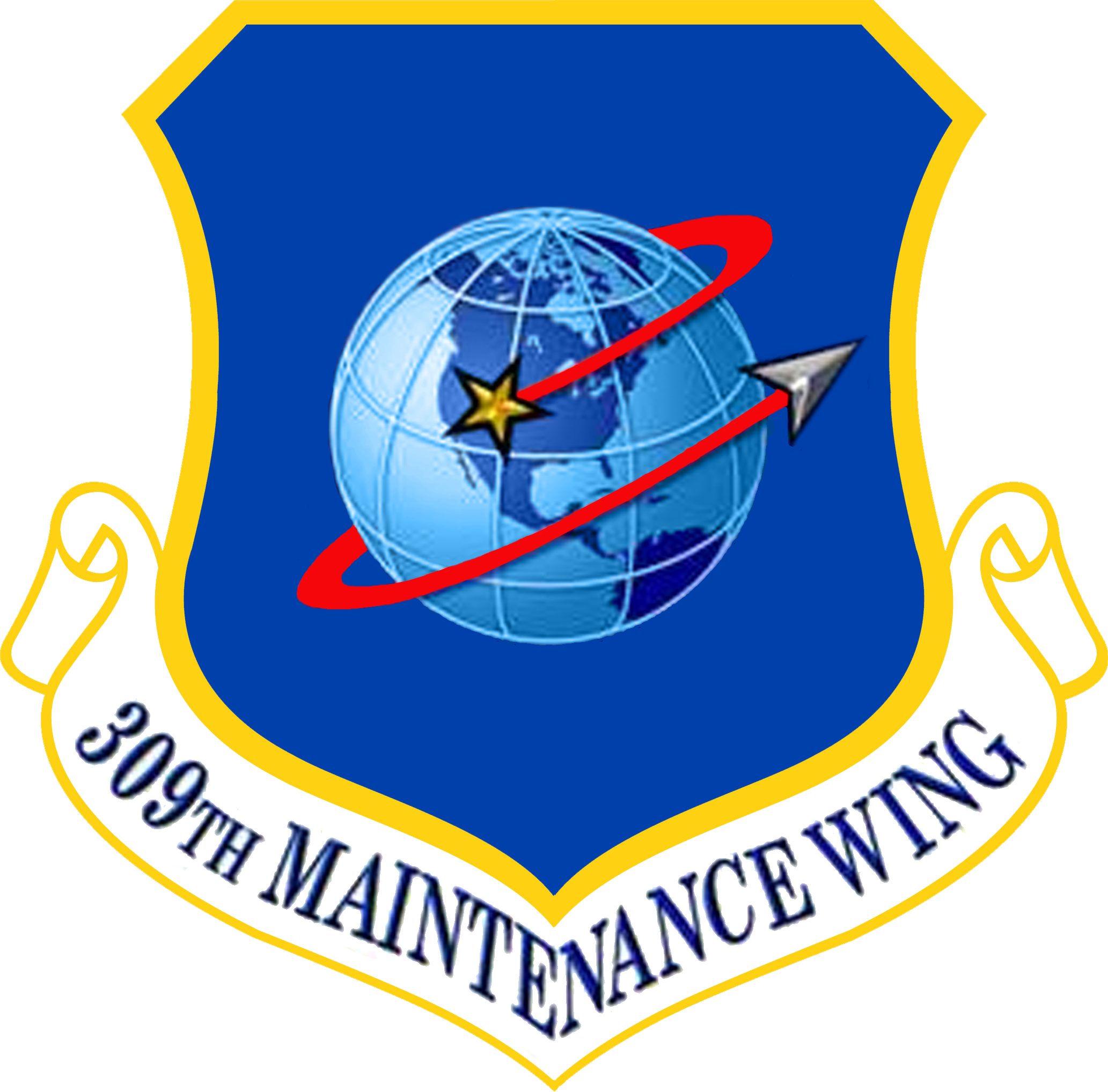
- 309th Maintenance Wing emblem (Note: Approved 5 July 2005.)

The 309th Maintenance Wing is an inactive wing of the United States Air Force last based at Hill Air Force Base, Utah. On July 12, 2012 it was inactivated and its function became part of the Ogden Air Logistics Complex.

The wing was established in 1942 as the 309th Bombardment Group. It served as an Operational Training Unit, then as a Replacement Training Unit for medium bomber units and aircrews until 1944, when it was disbanded, when the Army Air Forces reorganized its training units.

The unit was activated in the reserve in 1949 as the 309th Troop Carrier Group, a corollary unit of the 314th Troop Carrier Wing. It was inactivated in 1951 and its personnel used to man other units as a result of the Korean War. It was activated flying the Chase YC-122 Avitruc, then the Fairchild C-123 Provider as the United States Air Force's first assault airlift group. It deployed to Europe, but was inactivated in 1957 and its components transferred elsewhere. It was activated as a maintenance wing in 2005.

== History ==
=== World War II ===
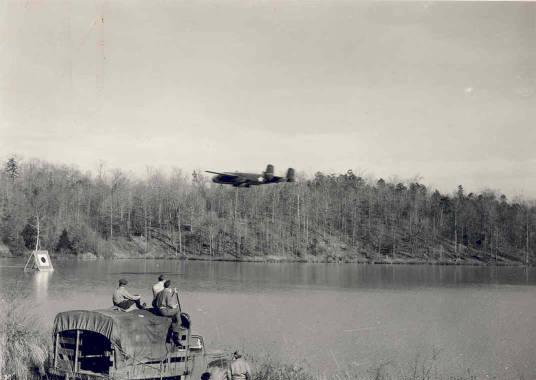
A B-25 at Issaqueena Bombing Range near Columbia SC in 1942 (Note: Unit not identified, but possibly from the 309th. A number of B-25 groups were formed at Columbia, but the 309th was the only one that remained on the base for more than a few months.)

The wing was first activated in the early expansion of the Army Air Forces during World War II as the 309th Bombardment Group at Davis-Monthan Field, Arizona. Its initial components were the 376th, 377th, and 378th Bombardment Squadrons, and the 37th Reconnaissance Squadron. The group was an Operational Training Unit (OTU), which trained bombardment groups until January 1943. The OTU program involved the use of an oversized parent unit to provide cadres to "satellite groups." It then became a Replacement Training Unit and trained replacement aircrews, using North American B-25 Mitchell aircraft in both training programs. In addition, the group operated specialist training schools, with as many as eight in operation at once. However, the AAF found that standard military units based on relatively inflexible tables of organization were proving to be less well adapted to performing the mission, so a more functional system was adopted in which each base was organized into a separate numbered unit. As a result, the group was disbanded in 1944 and replaced by the 329th Army Air Force Base Unit (Replacement Training Unit, Medium, Bombardment), which absorbed the mission, material, and personnel of the group. The group's four squadrons became Sections A through D of the Base Unit.

=== Reserve airlift operations ===
The May 1949 Air Force Reserve program called for a new type of unit, the Corollary unit, which was a reserve unit integrated with an active duty unit. The plan called for corollary units at 107 locations. It was viewed as the best method to train reservists by mixing them with an existing regular unit to perform duties alongside the regular unit. As part of this program, the group was reconstituted and redesignated as the 309th Troop Carrier Group at Sewart Air Force Base, Tennessee. The 309th used the aircraft of the active duty 314th Troop Carrier Wing, to which it was attached for training. The group was transferred to Tactical Air Command in 1950, after which it apparently ceased flying operations. All reserve combat and corollary units were mobilized for the Korean War. As a result, the 309th was inactivated in February 1951 and its personnel were used to man other units.

=== Assault airlift operations ===
The unit was reactivated at Ardmore Air Force Base, Oklahoma in July 1955. It replaced the 16th Troop Carrier Squadron, which was flying the Air Force's fleet of Chase YC-122 Avitrucs. The group became the first fixed wing assault airlift group in the Air Force and was the first to fly the Fairchild C-123B Provider. The 309th trained to airlift troops, equipment, and supplies for assault landings. After training with the 463d Troop Carrier Wing, the group deployed to Dreux-Louvilliers Air Base, France, ferrying its Providers over the north Atlantic. Although assigned to the 60th Troop Carrier Wing shortly after its arrival in France, the group was operationally controlled by the 322d Air Division. The group frequently supported airlift and fighter unit exercises involving deployments to dispersed operating bases, providing quicker and more secure transport than the road transport that had been used for these exercises prior to its arrival in Europe. However, the dispersed operating base concept proved oo costly, and other airlift requirements in Europe could be met by Fairchild C-119 Flying Boxcar units, so United States Air Forces Europe began to question the need for the C-123 in Europe. In November 1956, the group headquarters became non-operational and on 12 March 1957, it was inactivated and its squadrons transferred to the 60th Troop Carrier Wing.

=== Maintenance wing ===
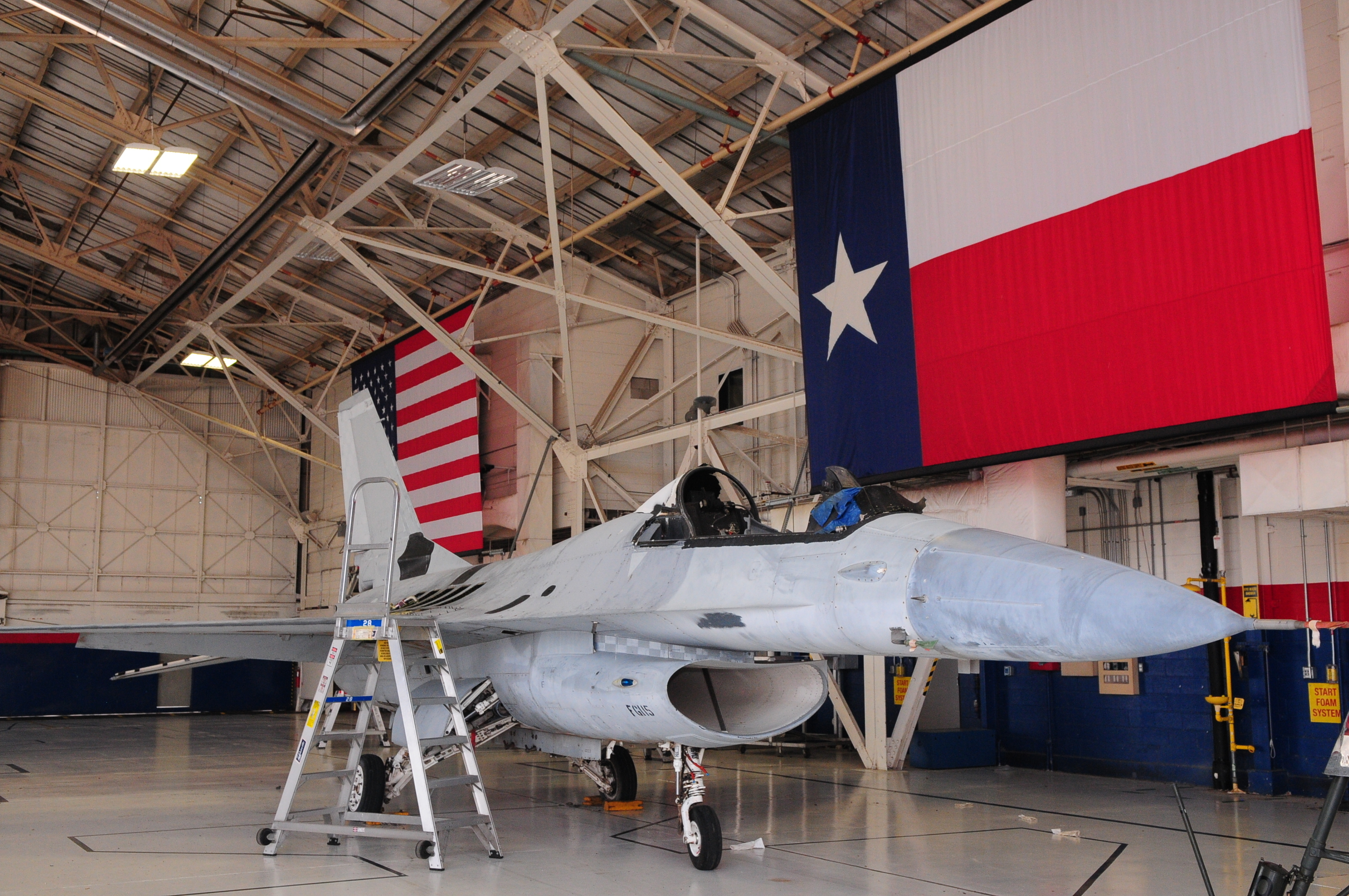
F-16 Fighting Falcon restoration by the 309th AMARG

The wing remained inactive until Air Force Materiel Command (AFMC) replaced many of its traditional subordinate command staff agencies with wings, groups, and squadrons in the Air Force Materiel Command Transformation Initiative. The 309th became the 309th Maintenance Wing and provided depot repair, modification and maintenance for the F-22A Raptor, F-16 Fighting Falcon, A-10 Thunderbolt, C-130 Hercules, and the Peacekeeper and Minuteman III intercontinental ballistic missiles. In 2012, AFMC reversed this action in the process of reducing its number of centers and inactivated the wing. On 12 July 2012, all wing components at Hill were absorbed by the Ogden Air Logistics Complex and the 309th Aerospace Maintenance and Regeneration Group was reassigned as the wing was inactivated on 1 October.

== Lineage ==
- Constituted as the 309th Bombardment Group (Medium) on 28 January 1942

Activated on 15 March 1942
Disbanded on 1 May 1944

- Reconstituted, redesignated 309th Troop Carrier Group, Medium and allotted to the reserve on 16 May 1949

Activated on 26 June 1949
Inactivated on 20 February 1951

- Redesignated 309th Troop Carrier Group, Assault, Fixed Wing on 14 April 1955

Activated on 8 July 1955
Inactivated on 12 March 1957

- Redesignated 309th Tactical Airlift Group on 31 July 1985 (remained inactive)
- Redesignated 309th Maintenance Wing on 31 January 2005

Activated on 18 February 2005
Inactivated on 1 October 2012

=== Assignments ===
- Third Air Force, 28 January 1942 – 1 May 1944
- Fourteenth Air Force, 26 June 1949 (attached to 314th Troop Carrier Wing)
- Tactical Air Command, 1 August 1950 – 20 February 1951
- Eighteenth Air Force, 8 July 1955 (attached to 463d Troop Carrier Wing until 21 May 1956)
- 322d Air Division, 2 June 1956
- 60th Troop Carrier Wing, 8 August 1956 – 20 April 1958
- Ogden Air Logistics Center, 24 February 2005 - 12 July 2012

=== Components ===
Groups

- 309th Commodities Maintenance Group, 24 February 2005 - 12 July 2012
- 309th Electronics Maintenance Group, 24 February 2005 - 12 July 2012
- 309th Maintenance & Supply Group (later 309th Aircraft Maintenance Group), 26 June 1949 - 20 February 1951 (attached); 24 February 2005 - 12 July 2012
- 309th Maintenance Support Group, 24 February 2005 - 12 July 2012
- 309th Missile Maintenance Group, 24 February 2005 - 12 July 2012
- 309th Software Maintenance Group, 24 February 2005 - 12 July 2012
- 309th Aerospace Maintenance and Regeneration Group, 2 May 2007 - 12 July 2012

Squadrons

- 37th Reconnaissance Squadron (later 426th Bombardment Squadron): 15 March 1942 – 1 May 1944
- 376th Bombardment Squadron (later 376th Troop Carrier Squadron): 15 March 1942 – 1 May 1944; 26 June 1949 – 20 February 1951; 8 July 1955 – 12 March 1957
- 377th Bombardment Squadron (later 377th Troop Carrier Squadron): 15 March 1942 – 1 May 1944; 26 June 1949 – 28 January 1950; 8 July 1955 – 12 March 1957
- 378th Bombardment Squadron (later 378th Troop Carrier Squadron): 15 March 1942 – 1 May 1944; 8 July 1955 – 12 March 1957

=== Stations ===
- Davis-Monthan Field, Arizona, 15 March 1942
- Jackson Army Air Base, Mississippi, 15 March 1942
- Key Field, Mississippi, c. 26 April 1942
- Columbia Army Air Base, South Carolina, 16 May 1942 – 1 May 1944
- Sewart Air Force Base, Tennessee, 26 June 1949 – 20 February 1951
- Ardmore Air Force Base, Oklahoma, 8 July 1955
- Dreux Air Base, France, 22 March 1956 – 12 March 1957
- Hill Air Force Base, Utah 24 February 2005 – 12 July 2012

=== Aircraft ===
- North American B-25 Mitchell, 1942–1944
- Douglas C-47 Skytrain, 1949-1950
- Fairchild C-82 Packet, 1949–1950
- Fairchild C-119 Flying Boxcar, 1949–1950
- Chase C-122 Avitruc, 1955–1956
- Fairchild C-123 Provider, 1955–1958

=== Awards and campaigns ===
Award streamer	Award	Dates	Notes
	Air Force Outstanding Unit Award	1 January 2004-31 December 2005	309th Maintenance Wing
	Air Force Outstanding Unit Award	1 January 2009-31 December 2009	309th Maintenance Wing
	Air Force Outstanding Unit Award	1 January 2011-27 May 2011	309th Maintenance Wing (staff agencies)

Campaign Streamer	Campaign	Dates	Notes
	American Theater without inscription	15 March 1942 – 1 May 1944	309th Bombardment Group
