= 377th Troop Carrier Squadron =

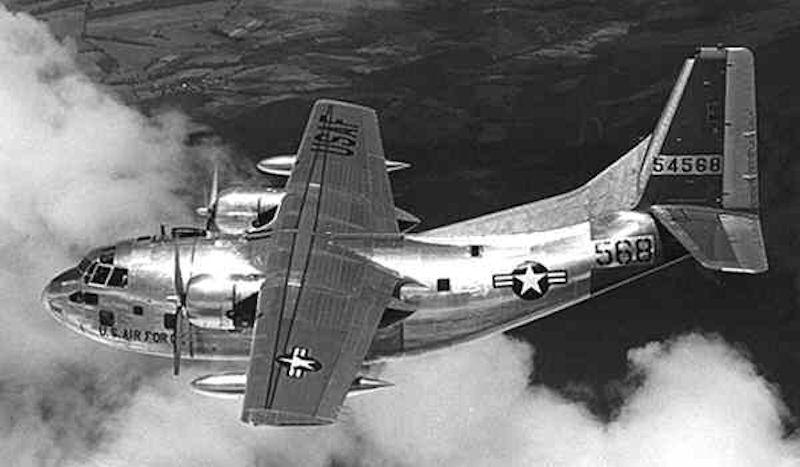
- C-123B Provider as flown by the squadron (Note: Aircraft is Fairchild C-123B-15-FA Provider, serial 55-4568.)
- Active: 1942–1944; 1949–1951; 1955–1958
- Country: United States
- Branch: United States Air Force
- Type: Airlift

Insignia
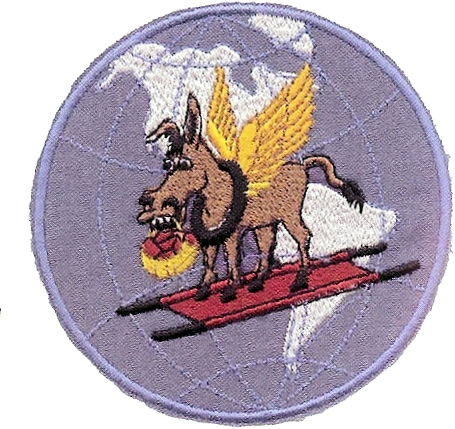
- Patch with 377th Troop Carrier Squadron emblem

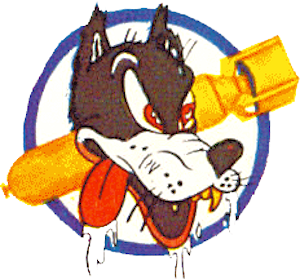
- 377th Bombardment Squadron emblem

The 377th Troop Carrier Squadron is an inactive United States Air Force unit. It was last active at Dreux Air Base, France on 25 September 1958.

The squadron was first activated in 1942 as the 377th Bombardment Squadron. It served as an Operational Training Unit, then as a Replacement Training Unit until disbanding in 1944 in a general reorganization of Army Air Forces training units.

The squadron was redesignated the 377th Troop Carrier Squadron and activated in the reserves in 1949. In 1951, its personnel were used as fillers for other units and the squadron was inactivated. It was again activated in 1955 and, after training in Oklahoma, moved to France, where it served as an assault airlift organization.

== History ==
=== World War II bomber training ===
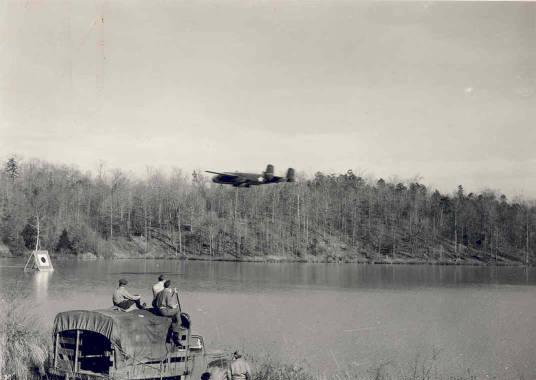
A B-25 at Issaqueena Bombing Range near Columbia SC in 1942 (Note: Unit not identified, but possibly from the 309th Bombardment Group. A number of B-25 groups were formed at Columbia, but the 309th was the only one that remained on the base for more than a few months.)

The squadron was first activated as the 377th Bombardment Squadron in March 1942 at Davis–Monthan Field, Arizona, but immediately moved on paper to Jackson Army Air Base, Mississippi. Within little over a month, it would move to Key Field, Mississippi before settling down at Columbia Army Air Base, South Carolina in May. The squadron was one of the four squadrons of the 309th Bombardment Group. At Columbia, it equipped with North American B-25 Mitchells and became an Operational Training Unit (OTU).

The OTU program involved the use of an oversized parent unit to provide cadres to "satellite" units The OTU program was patterned after the unit training system of the Royal Air Force. The parent unit assumed responsibility for the satellite's training and oversaw its expansion with graduates of Army Air Forces Training Command schools to become an effective combat unit. Training was conducted in three phases. Phase I training concentrated on individual training in crewmember specialties. Phase II training emphasized the coordination for the crew to act as a team. The final phase concentrated on operation as a unit.

In January 1943 the squadron became a Replacement Training Unit (RTU). RTUs were also oversized units, but their mission was to train individual pilots or aircrews. Most combat units had been activated and many had deployed overseas. With the exception of special programs, like forming Boeing B-29 Superfortress units, training “fillers” for existing units became more important than unit training. However, the Army Air Forces (AAF) was finding that standard military units like the 377th, whose manning was based on relatively inflexible tables of organization were not well adapted to the training mission, even more so to the replacement mission. Accordingly, the AAF adopted a more functional system in which each base was organized into a separate numbered unit. The 377th and all other elements of the 309th Bombardment Group were disbanded in May 1944. Along with support units at Columbia, they were replaced by the 329th AAF Base Unit (Replacement Training Unit, Medium, Bombardment).

=== Reserve operations ===
The squadron was reconstituted as the 377th Troop Carrier Squadron and activated as a reserve unit at Smyrna Air Force Base, Tennessee in June 1949. The allotment of units to the reserves was made only for planning purposes and mobilization plans called for personnel assigned to the units to be called to active duty during mobilization as individuals, not as a unit. The squadron was a new type of unit, a corollary unit, which was a reserve unit integrated with an active duty unit. This was viewed as the best method to train reservists by mixing them with an existing regular unit to perform duties alongside the regular unit, using the regular unit’s aircraft. Its objective was to permit reservists to be employed immediately upon mobilization. However, corollary unit training had to be balanced against the regular unit’s mission, and deployment and exercise participation interrupted training activities. Squadron aircrew flew the Douglas C-47 Skytrain, Fairchild C-82 Packet and Fairchild C-119 Flying Boxcar aircraft of the 314th Troop Carrier Group.

In August 1950, the 314th Group deployed to Japan to augment Fifth Air Force units in the Korean War. Squadron operations ceased at this time, and the squadron was inactivated in February 1951.

=== Assault airlift in Europe ===
The squadron was again activated at Ardmore Air Force Base, Oklahoma in July 1955, and was equipped with Fairchild C-123 Provider assault transports. Along with the other operational squadrons of the 309th Troop Carrier Group, it drew its equipment and initial cadre from the 16th Troop Carrier Squadron, which was simultaneously inactivated, After completing its training with the Providers, it departed in May 1956, ferrying its C-123s over the North Atlantic, and arriving at Dreux Air Base, (Note: The base was originally Dreux-Louvilliers Air Base, but the name was shortened in 1954. McAuliffe, p. 257.) France in June.

From Dreux, the squadron flew transport and special air missions throughout France, West Germany, Italy, Spain and England. During exercises, it flew its planned wartime mission, transporting recovery teams to dispersed operating bases to refuel and rearm fighters under field conditions. In November 1956, the 309th Group became non-operational and the squadron was attached to the 60th Troop Carrier Wing, the host at Dreux. The following March, the 309th Group was inactivated and the squadron was assigned directly to the 60th Wing. However, United States Air Forces in Europe deemed the dispersed operating base concept too costly and, by 1958, the need for the squadron's C-123Bs evaporated. In July 1958, the squadron began ferrying its Providers back to Ardmore Air Force Base, with all aircraft returned to the United States by the end of August. The squadron was formally inactivated on 25 September.

== Lineage ==
- Constituted as the 377th Bombardment Squadron (Medium) on 28 January 1942

Activated on 15 March 1942
Disbanded on 1 May 1944
Reconstituted and redesignated 377th Troop Carrier Squadron, Medium on 16 May 1949
Activated in the reserve on 26 June 1949
Inactivated on 28 January 1950
Redesignated 377th Troop Carrier Squadron, Assault (Fixed Wing) on 14 April 1955
Activated on 8 July 1955
Redesignated 377th Troop Carrier Squadron, Assault on 15 July 1958
Inactivated on 25 September 1958

=== Assignments ===
- 309th Bombardment Group, 15 March 1942 – 1 May 1944
- 309th Troop Carrier Group, 26 June 1949 – 28 January 1950
- 309th Troop Carrier Group, 8 July 1955 (attached to 60th Troop Carrier Wing after 15 November 1956)
- 60th Troop Carrier Wing, 12 March 1957 – 25 September 1958

=== Stations ===
- Davis-Monthan Field, Arizona, 15 March 1942
- Jackson Army Air Base, Mississippi, 15 March 1942
- Key Field, Mississippi, 29 April 1942;
- Columbia Army Air Base, South Carolina, 15 May 1942 – 1 May 1944
- Smyrna Air Force Base (later Sewart Air Force Base), Tennessee, 26 June 1949 – 28 January 1950
- Ardmore Air Force Base, Oklahoma, 8 July 1955 – 21 May 1956
- Dreux Air Base, France, 2 June 1956 – 25 September 1958

=== Aircraft ===
- North American B-25 Mitchell, 1942–1944
- Fairchild C-123 Provider, 1955–1958

=== Campaign ===
Service Streamer	Campaign	Dates	Notes
	American Theater without inscription	15 March 192–1 May 1944	377th Bombardment Squadron

== See also ==
- List of United States Air Force airlift squadrons
