= 309th Aerospace Maintenance and Regeneration Group =

US Air Force unit

Coordinates: 32.16°N 110.85°W

309th Aerospace Maintenance and Regeneration Group

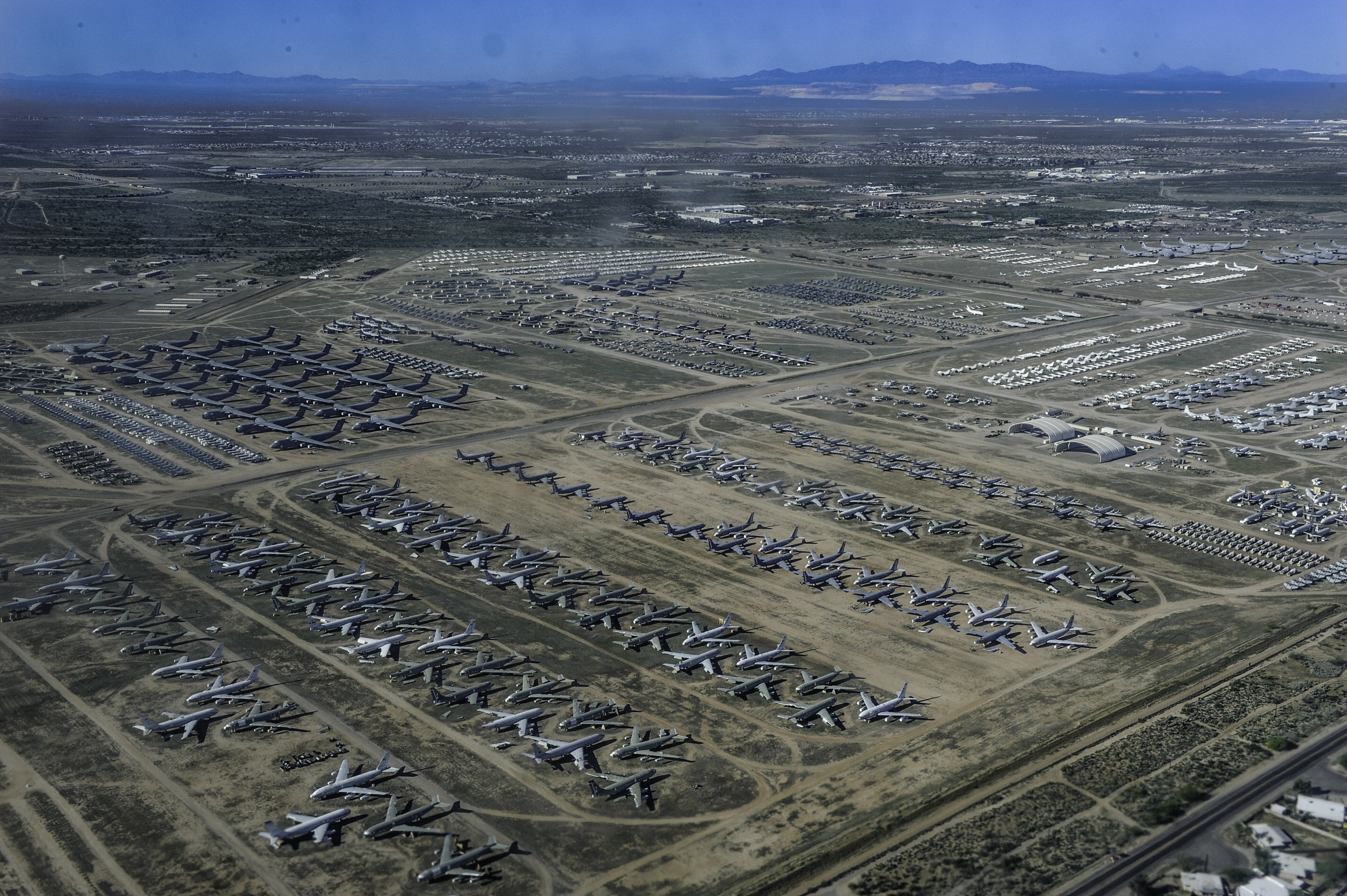
- Aircraft in storage at Davis–Monthan AFB
- Active: 1964–present
- Country: United States
- Branch: Air Force
- Type: Group
- Role: Equipment Support
- Part of: Air Force Materiel Command
- Garrison/HQ: Davis–Monthan Air Force Base

Commanders
- Current commander: Colonel Neil O. Aurelio

Insignia
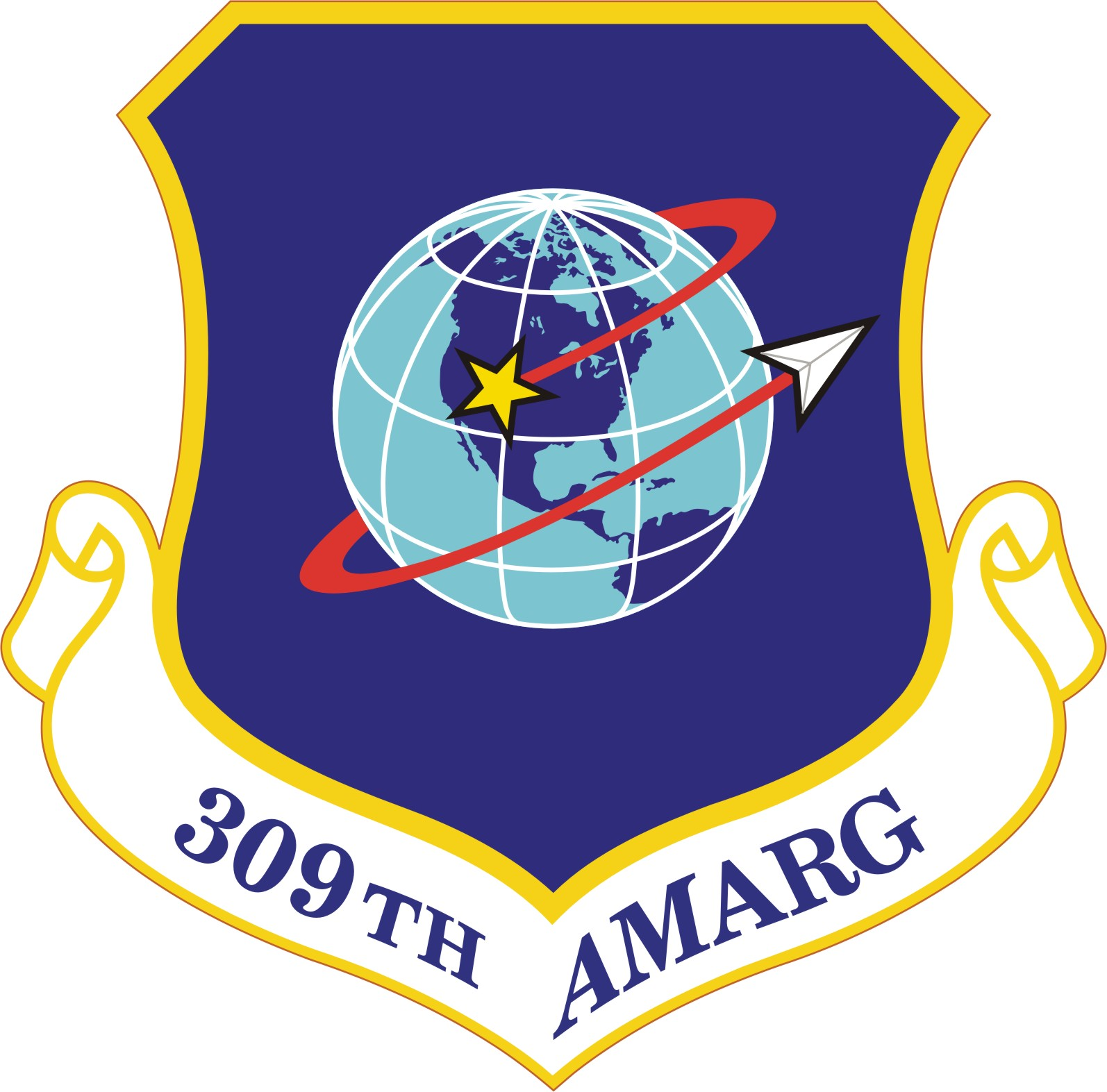
- 309th Aerospace Maintenance and Regeneration Group emblem (Note: While assigned to the 309th Wing, the group uses the wing emblem with the group designation on the scroll. AF Instruction 84-105, Organizational Lineage, Honors and History, 27 April 2017, paragraph 3.3.3.)

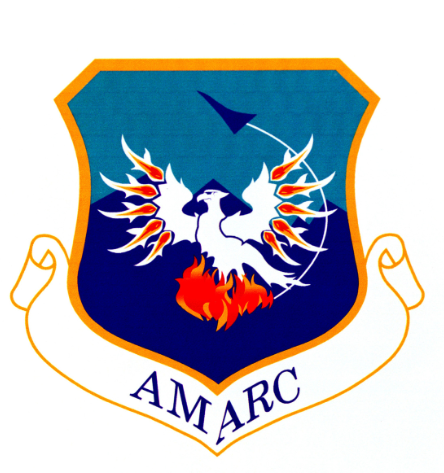
- Aerospace Maintenance and Regeneration Center emblem (Note: Approved 15 May 1995.)

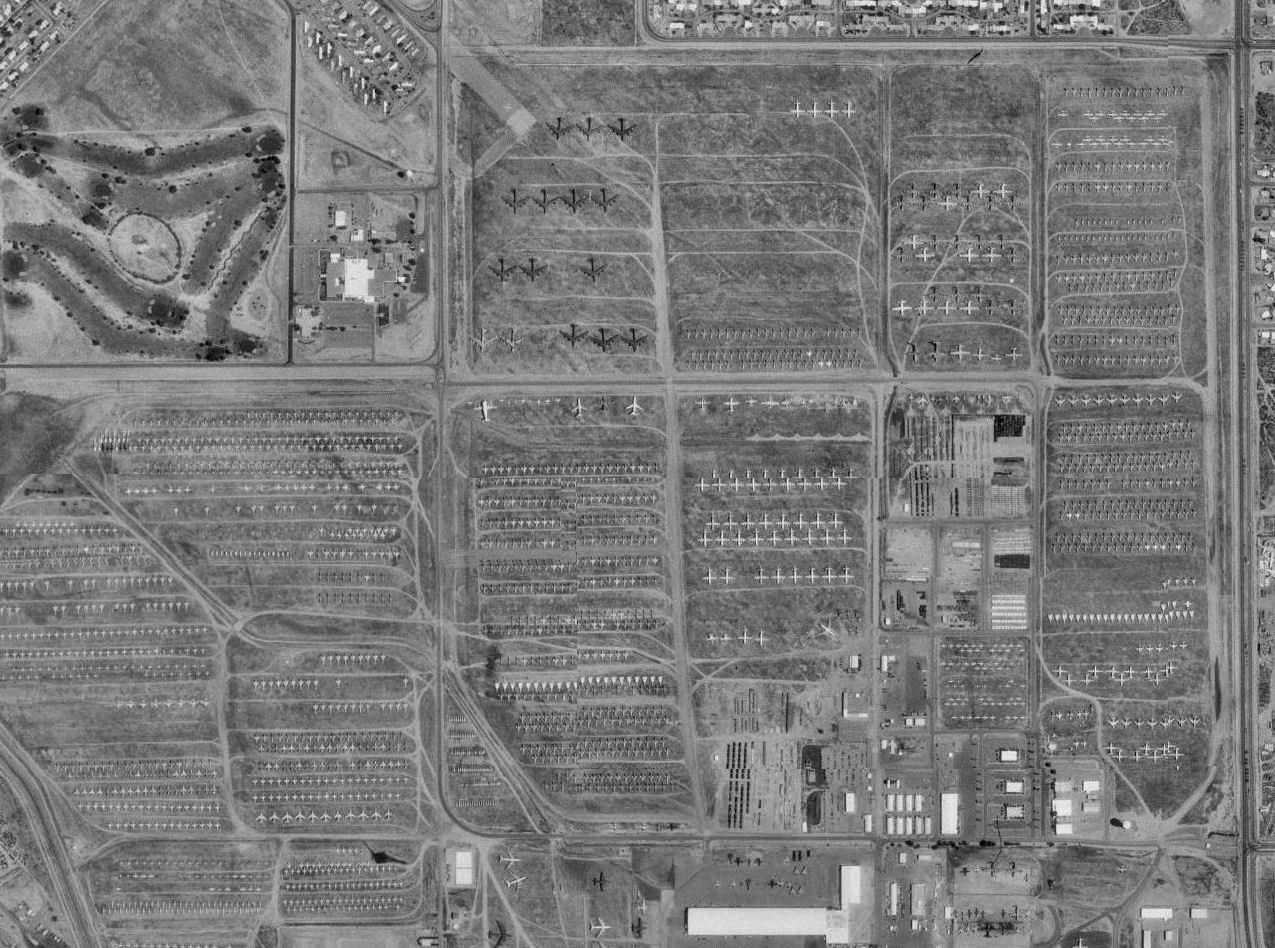
Aerial view of the AMARC facility, smaller northwest aircraft storage area, 16 May 1992

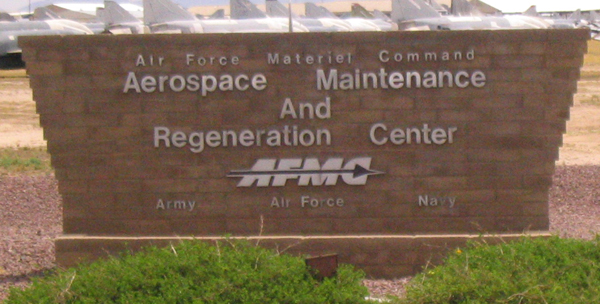
Welcome sign at AMARC before its 2007 name change

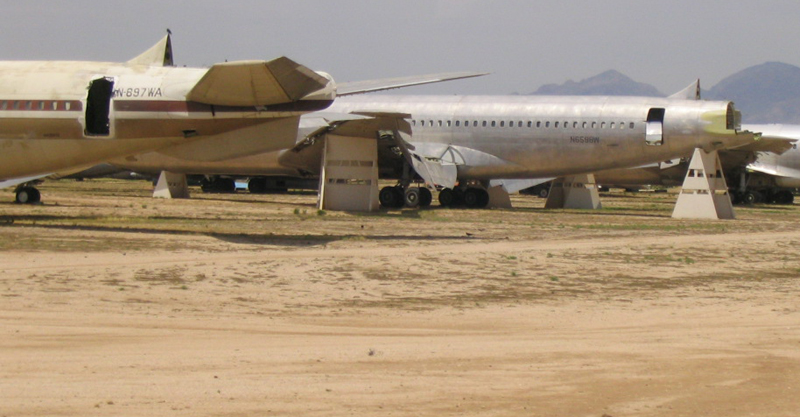
Boeing 707s being used for salvage parts for the C-135 airframe at AMARG

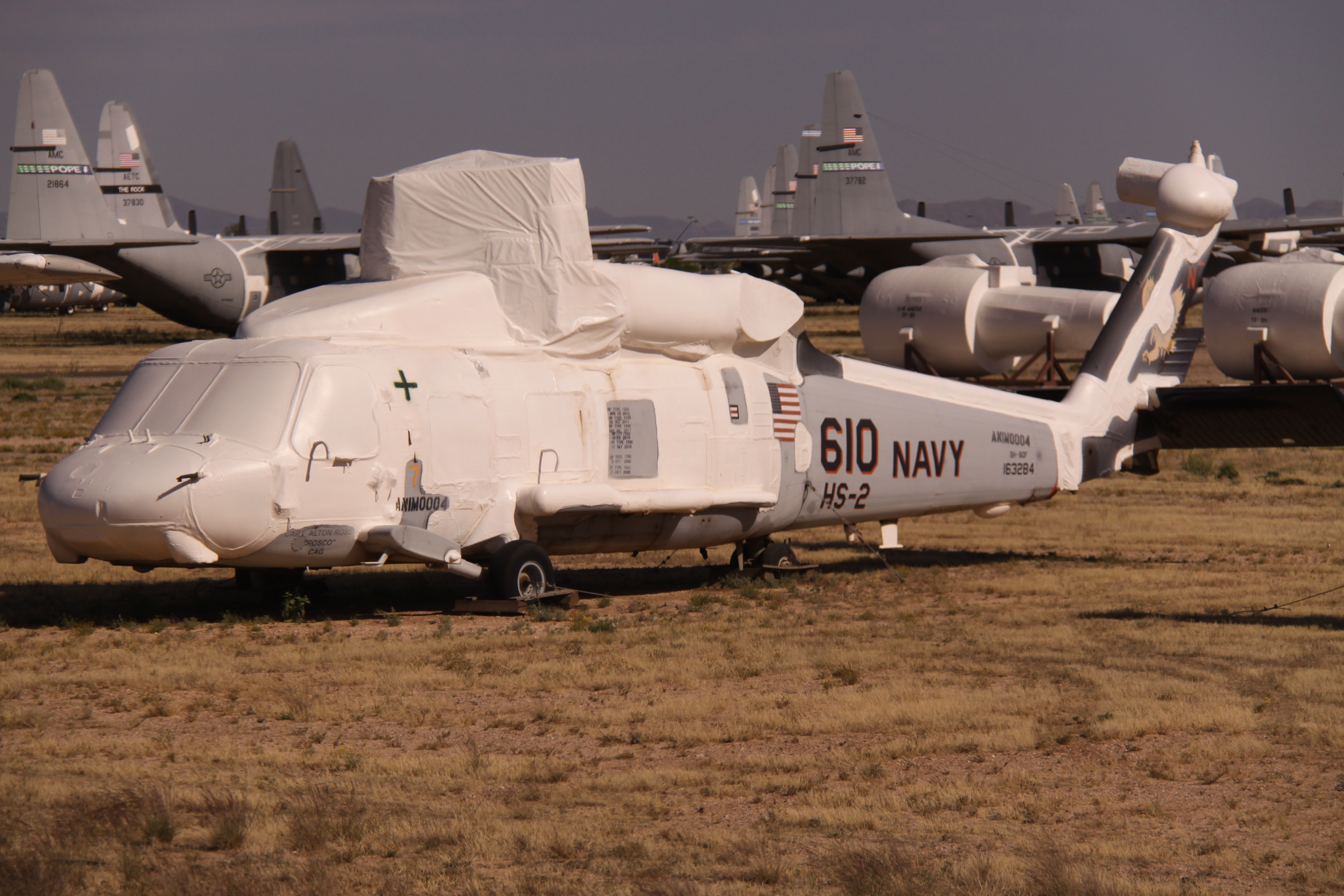
Sikorsky SH-60 Seahawk helicopter at AMARG

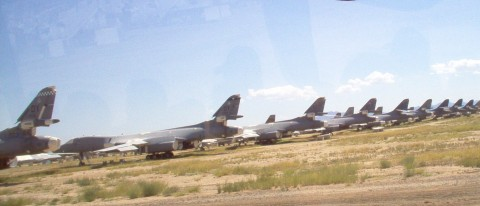
B-1 bombers in storage at AMARG

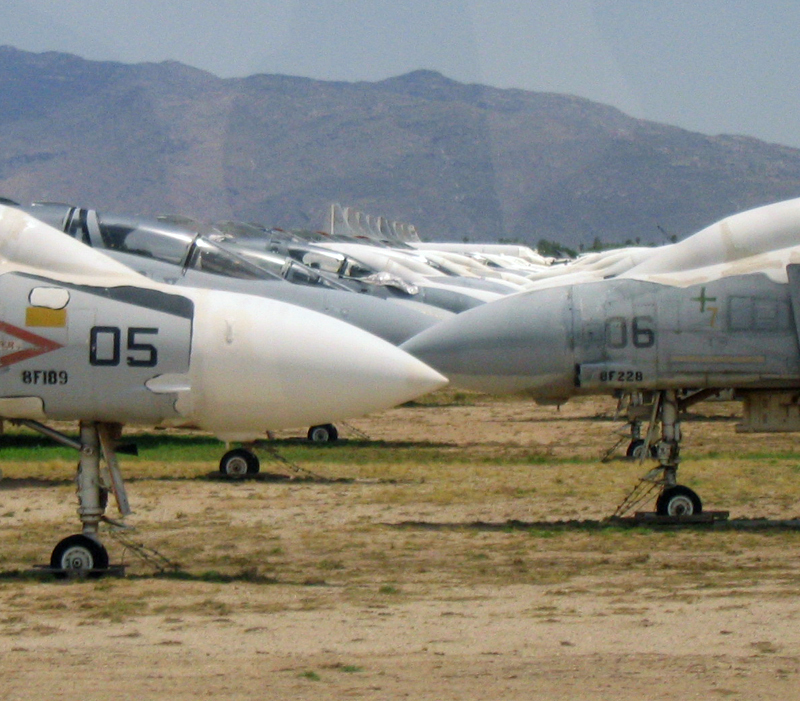
Navy and Marine Corps McDonnell Douglas F-4 Phantom II fighters in storage at AMARG

The 309th Aerospace Maintenance and Regeneration Group (309th AMARG), often called the Boneyard, is a United States Air Force aircraft and missile storage and maintenance facility in Tucson, Arizona, located on Davis–Monthan Air Force Base. The 309th AMARG was previously Aerospace Maintenance and Regeneration Center, and the Military Aircraft Storage and Disposition Center.

The 309th AMARG takes care of nearly 4,000 aircraft, which makes it the largest aircraft storage and preservation facility in the world. An Air Force Materiel Command unit, the group is under the command of the Ogden Air Logistics Complex at Hill Air Force Base, Utah. The 309th AMARG was originally meant to store excess Department of Defense and Coast Guard aircraft, but has in recent years been designated the sole repository of out-of-service aircraft from all branches of the US government. The facility has also received US-made foreign military aircraft such as the Boeing CC-137 (from RCAF for use in the E-8 JSTARS program) and the Lockheed CP-140A Arcturus (2 from RCAF). The arid climate of the region makes the 309th AMARG an ideal location for storing aircraft, as there is very little humidity in the air that would corrode metal. Furthermore, the surface is hard so that the aircraft do not sink into the ground.

== History ==
Aircraft storage at Davis-Monthan Field began when the 4105th Army Air Forces Base Unit (Aircraft Storage) was organized in 1945, to house Boeing B-29 Superfortress and Douglas C-47 Skytrain aircraft. Davis–Monthan Field was chosen because of Tucson's low humidity, infrequent rainfall, alkaline soil, and high altitude of 2,550 feet (780 m), reducing rust and corrosion. The hard soil makes it possible to move aircraft around without having to pave the storage areas.

In 1949, after the Air Force's creation as a separate service, the unit was redesignated as the 3040th Aircraft Storage Depot, and later 3040 Aircraft Storage Squadron. On 1 June 1956, the 3040 Aircraft Storage Squadron was discontinued. In 1965, the Military Aircraft Storage and Disposition Center was organized and tasked with processing aircraft for all the United States armed forces, not just the Air Force. The Navy had operated its own boneyard at Naval Air Station Litchfield Park at Goodyear, Arizona, for Navy, Marine Corps and Coast Guard aircraft. In February 1965, some 500 aircraft were moved from Litchfield Park to Davis–Monthan. NAS Litchfield Park was finally closed in 1968.

In the 1980s, the center began processing intercontinental ballistic missiles for dismantling or reuse in satellite launches, and was renamed the Aerospace Maintenance and Regeneration Center (AMARC) to reflect the expanded focus on all aerospace assets.

In the 1990s, in accordance with the START I treaty, the center was tasked with eliminating 365 Boeing B-52 Stratofortress bombers. The progress of this task was to be verified by Russia via satellite and first-person inspection at the facility. Initially, the B-52s were chopped into pieces with a 13,000 pound guillotine winched by a steel cable supported by a crane. Later on, the tool of choice became K-12 rescue saws. This more precise technique afforded AMARC with salvageable spare parts.

In May 2007, the AMARC was transferred to the 309th Maintenance Wing, and the center was renamed the 309th Aerospace Maintenance and Regeneration Group (AMARG).

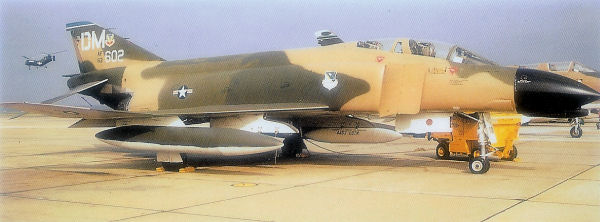
McDonnell F-4C-20-MC Phantom II AF Serial No. 63-7602 of the 4455th CCTS/4453d Combat Crew Training Wing, 16 July 1970. Aircraft was scrapped at Hill AFB, UT November 1986

=== Lineage ===
- Constituted on 7 October 1964 as The Military Aircraft Storage and Disposition Center
  - Activated on 1 February 1965
  - Redesignated Aerospace Maintenance & Regeneration Center on 1 October 1985
  - Redesignated 309th Aerospace Maintenance & Regeneration Group on 2 May 2007

=== Predecessors ===
==== 3040th Aircraft Storage Squadron ====
- Designated as the 4105th Army Air Forces Base Unit (Aircraft Storage) and organized on 15 November 1945
  - Redesignated 4105th Air Force Base Unit (Aircraft Storage) on 26 September 1947
  - Redesignated 3040th Aircraft Storage Depot on 28 August 1948
  - Redesignated 3040th Aircraft Storage Squadron
  - Discontinued on 1 June 1956

==== Arizona Aircraft Storage Squadron ====
- Designated as the Arizona Aircraft Storage Squadron and organized on 1 June 1956
  - Discontinued on 1 August 1959

==== 2704th Air Force Aircraft Storage and Disposition Group ====
- Designated as the 2704th Air Force Aircraft Storage and Disposition Group and organized on 1 August 1959
  - Discontinued on 1 February 1965

=== Assignments ===
- Air Force Logistics Command, 7 October 1964
- Air Force Materiel Command, 1 July 1992
- 309th Maintenance Wing, 2 May 2007 (attached to Ogden Air Logistics Complex after 12 July 2012)
- Ogden Air Logistics Complex, 1 October 2012 – present

== Storage procedures ==
There are four categories of storage for aircraft at AMARG:

- Long Term (Type 1000) – Aircraft are kept intact in "inviolate" storage for future use. No parts are removed without the express permission of appropriate program office.
- Parts Reclamation (Type 2000) – Aircraft are kept, picked apart and used for spare parts.
- Flying Hold (Type 3000) – Aircraft are kept intact with regular running of their engines, towing to lubricate their bearings and servicing of fluids.
- Excess of DoD needs (Type 4000) – Aircraft are sold off whole or in parts.

AMARG employs approximately 500 DoD civil servants and 200 contractors. The 2,600-acre (11 km^{2}) facility is adjacent to the base. On average, AMARG annually returns approximately $500 million worth of spare parts to military, government, and allied customers. Congressional oversight determines what equipment may be sold to which customer.

An aircraft going into storage undergoes the following treatments:

- Ejection seat charges and classified hardware are removed.
- All aircraft are carefully washed with fresh water to remove environment residue and then allowed to dry.
- The fuel system is protected by draining it, refilling it with lightweight oil, running engines to coat fuel system plumbing and engines, and then draining it again. This leaves a protective oil film.
- The aircraft is sealed from dust, sunlight, and high temperatures. This is done using a variety of materials, including a high tech vinyl plastic compound that is sprayed on the aircraft. This compound is called Spraylat after its producer the Spraylat Corporation, and is applied in two coats, a black coat that seals the aircraft and a white coat that reflects the sun and helps to keep internal temperatures low. The plane is then towed by a tug to its designated "storage" position.

On average the Group annually receives 300 aircraft for storage and processes out about the same number (with 50 to 100 of those returning to flying service). Aircraft that fly again either return to the US military, US government agencies such as the US Coast Guard, US Forest Service, and NASA, or are sold to allied governments under the Excess Defense Articles program of the Foreign Assistance Act.

== Accessibility ==
AMARG is a controlled-access site, and is off-limits to anyone not employed there without the proper clearance. From April 2013 onwards the base had hosted an annual 10K/5K run/walk which was open to the general public.

== Use in film and TV production ==
AMARG was used as a filming location in Transformers: Revenge of the Fallen. The exterior scenes of the Smithsonian set were actually filmed in the Boneyard.

AMARG was featured in an episode of TNT's The Great Escape.

AMARG was featured in the film Can't Buy Me Love (1987).

== See also ==
- Pinal Airpark
