= 377 BC =

377 BC in various calendars
Gregorian calendar	377 BC; CCCLXXVII BC
Ab urbe condita	377
Ancient Egypt era	XXX dynasty, 4
Pharaoh	Nectanebo I, 4
Ancient Greek Olympiad (summer)	100th Olympiad, year 4
Assyrian calendar	4374
Balinese saka calendar	N/A
Bengali calendar	−970 – −969
Berber calendar	574
Buddhist calendar	168
Burmese calendar	−1014
Byzantine calendar	5132–5133
Chinese calendar	癸卯年 (Water Rabbit); 2321 or 2114 — to — 甲辰年 (Wood Dragon); 2322 or 2115
Coptic calendar	−660 – −659
Discordian calendar	790
Ethiopian calendar	−384 – −383
Hebrew calendar	3384–3385
- Hindu calendars
Vikram Samvat	−320 – −319
Shaka Samvat	N/A
Kali Yuga	2724–2725
Holocene calendar	9624
Iranian calendar	998 BP – 997 BP
Islamic calendar	1029 BH – 1028 BH
Javanese calendar	N/A
Julian calendar	N/A
Korean calendar	1957
Minguo calendar	2288 before ROC 民前2288年
Nanakshahi calendar	−1844
Thai solar calendar	166–167
Tibetan calendar	ཆུ་མོ་ཡོས་ལོ་ (female Water-Hare) −250 or −631 or −1403 — to — ཤིང་ཕོ་འབྲུག་ལོ་ (male Wood-Dragon) −249 or −630 or −1402

Year 377 BC was a year of the pre-Julian Roman calendar. At the time, it was known as the Year of the Tribunate of Mamercinus, Poplicola, Cicurinus, Rufus (or Praetextatus), Cincinnatus and Cincinnatus (or, less frequently, year 377 Ab urbe condita). The denomination 377 BC for this year has been used since the early medieval period, when the Anno Domini calendar era became the prevalent method in Europe for naming years.

== Events ==
=== By place ===
==== Persian Empire ====
- Mausolus is appointed as the Persian satrap of Caria.

==== Greece ====
- Timotheus wins over the Acarnanians and Molossians as friends of Athens.
- Athens, in preparing for participation in the Spartan-Theban struggle, reorganises its finances and its taxation, inaugurating a system whereby the richer citizens are responsible for the collection of taxes from the less rich.
- The Peace of Antalcidas (387 BC), includes a clause guaranteeing the Greek cities their independence. The Spartan King Agesilaus II uses this clause as an excuse to force the dissolution of Thebes' Boeotian League. In two sieges, he reduces Thebes to near starvation.
