= Louvilliers-lès-Perche =

- Commune
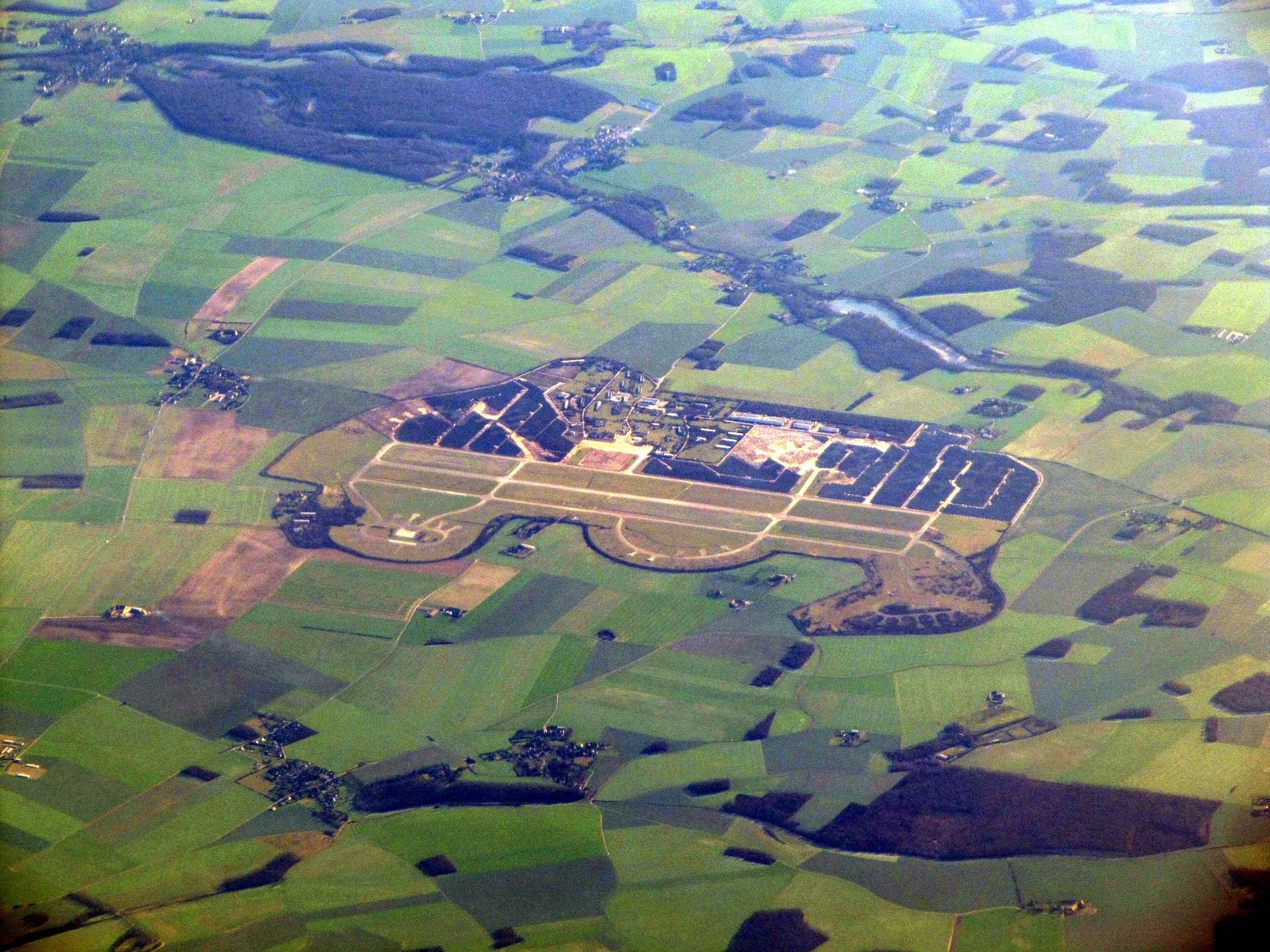
- The Dreux-Louvilliers Air Base
- Location of Louvilliers-lès-Perche
- Location within France Location within Centre-Val de Loire
- Coordinates: 48°37′25″N 1°04′46″E
- Country: France
- Region: Centre-Val de Loire
- Department: Eure-et-Loir
- Arrondissement: Dreux
- Canton: Saint-Lubin-des-Joncherets

Government
  - Mayor (2020–2026): Marie-Christine Loyer
- Area^{1}: 14.5 km^{2} (5.6 sq mi)
- Elevation: 186 m (610 ft)
- Highest elevation: 212 m (696 ft)
- Lowest elevation: 161 m (528 ft)
- Population (2023): 207
  - Density: 14.3/km^{2} (37.0/sq mi)
- Time zone: UTC+01:00 (CET)
  - Summer (DST): UTC+02:00 (CEST)
- INSEE/Postal code: 28217 /28250
- ^{1} French Land Register data, which excludes lakes, ponds, glaciers > 1 km^{2} (0.386 sq mi or 247 acres) and river estuaries.

Louvilliers-lès-Perche (French pronunciation: [luvilje lɛ pɛʁʃ], literally Louvilliers near Perche) is a commune in the Eure-et-Loir department in northern France.

== Geography ==
The Commune along with another 70 communes shares part of a 47,681 hectare, Natura 2000 conservation area, called the Forêts et étangs du Perche.

== Population ==
Historical population
Year	Pop.	±% p.a.
1968	143	—
1975	121	−2.36%
1982	134	+1.47%
1990	114	−2.00%
1999	138	+2.15%
2007	150	+1.05%
2012	174	+3.01%
2017	184	+1.12%
2023	207	+1.98%
Source: INSEE

== See also ==
- Communes of the Eure-et-Loir department
