= Operational - Replacement Training Units =

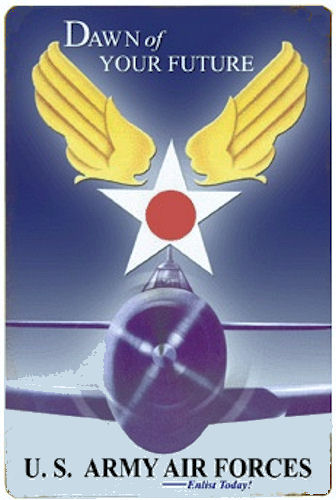
- United States Army Air Forces recruiting poster
- Active: 1942–1945
- Country: United States of America
- Branch: United States Army Air Forces
- Role: Group/Replacement Aircrew Training
- Part of: First Air Force; Second Air Force; Third Air Force; Fourth Air Force; I Troop Carrier Command; Air Transport Command
- Nickname: OTU (Operational Training Unit); RTU (Replacement Training Unit)
- Engagements: World War II: World War II American Theater

Operational Training Units (OTU) and Replacement Training Units (RTU) were training organizations of the United States Army Air Forces during World War II. Unlike the schools of the Army Air Forces Training Command (AAFTC), OTU-RTU units were operational units of the four domestic numbered air forces along with I Troop Carrier Command and Air Transport Command, with the mission of final phase training new pilots or crews. Most were disbanded in the spring of 1944 and replaced by combat crew replacement centers assigned to base units.

== History ==
When the Army Air Corps began its great expansion program in 1939, no provision for operational training existed outside the combat groups themselves. Graduates of the flying schools were assigned either to fill the requirements of existing combat squadrons or to round out the cadre taken from an older unit to form a new one. Each combat squadron was responsible for training its own personnel in order to meet proficiency standards set by training directives from the GHQ Air Force. This method was developed after World War I, and was used successfully in the peacetime Air Corps of the 1920s and 1930s.

With war imminent, the number of authorized groups in the Air Corps had risen from twenty-five in April 1939 to eighty-four. With the withdrawal of cadres to form new units for this expansion, the average level of experience in all groups had declined sharply, with a corresponding effect on operational training. Although there were multiple other causes for the inefficacy of training, such as a shortage of planes and maintenance services, it was clear enough to the Air Corps that it could not plan its training based upon having enough cadres sufficiently experienced to guarantee prompt lifting of whole units to the desired level of proficiency.

=== Operational Training Units ===
Major Robert B. Williams, an Air Corps observer in England between September 1940 and January 1941 who later commanded the Second Air Force and a bombardment division of the Eighth, reported favorably to the Office of the Chief of Air Corps on the merits of the Royal Air Force's operational training unit (OTU) system. The RAF program inspired a proposal in January 1942 by Brig. Gen. Follett Bradley, commanding III Bomber Command, to his superior at Third Air Force that an OTU system be instituted in the Air Force Combat Command (which had the responsibility for training new AAF units) as a means of having sufficient experienced personnel to train newly activated groups while not degrading the proficiency of groups headed for combat. Under the system that had been in place since 1939, so many experienced groups would likely be needed for immediate requirements overseas that a critical shortage of experienced personnel needed to develop new units was inevitable. Adapting from the existing system, Bradley proposed that certain groups be designated "parent" groups, with an authorized overstrength, to provide cadres for newly activated (or "satellite") groups and assume responsibility for their organization and training. Fresh graduates of training schools would bring the satellite groups to authorized strength and, in a constantly recurring pattern, also restore the parent group to its overstrength.

The plan was largely adopted by AFCC in February 1942 to direct operational training in the Second and Third Air Forces, where the bulk of new units were being activated, but by May the AFCC had been dissolved as an extraneous echelon of command and the OTU system was extended by Headquarters AAF to the First and Fourth Air Forces for training new fighter groups. In its first year the system proved difficult to implement to full effect. Unforeseen emergency demands from the combat theaters for experienced units, an erratic supply of combat-type aircraft for training purposes, and an uneven flow of personnel from the individual training programs produced uneven results that took time and experience to work out. By early 1943, however, the plan was in general operation and became increasingly effective in preparing combat groups for action.

In most instances, six months were required after the formation of a group to complete its organization and training. Operational training officially commenced for a new group on the day that the cadre was assigned it from the parent group's overstrength. In 1942 the four continental air forces provided training directives to familiarize key members of cadre with their obligations but these varied from air force to air force. Beginning in 1943, cadre leaders received standardized training through a thirty-day course of instruction at the Army Air Forces School of Applied Tactics (AAFSAT) in Orlando, Florida, established in November 1942 partly for this purpose. Cadres for medium and heavy bombardment units were trained by AAFSAT's Bombardment Department, fighter cadres by its Air Defense Department, and light bombardment cadres by the Air Support Department. The AAFSAT course consisted of both an academic and a practical phase. During the academic phase, cadre leaders reviewed problems of command, operations, and intelligence under expert tutelage related to the mission of their group. During the practical phase, the cadre was assigned to an AAFSAT base for 50 hours of operational exercises assisted by the base's demonstration squadron, including simulated combat missions. While practical experience was of value in preparing the cadres, close coordination of the academic and practical phases was sometimes lacking and the exercises also suffered occasionally from a lack of needed equipment. On returning to their assigned OTU stations, the cadres began training with their units, which by this time had usually reached regulation strength. Group instruction was divided in varying proportions between individual and team training but during the final phase both air and ground echelons functioned as nearly as possible as a self-contained combat unit.

=== Replacement Training Units ===
While the OTU system was evolving as the most suitable means of training new groups for combat, a plan calling for the establishment of Replacement Training Units (RTUs) as a regular means of providing replacement crews and crew members was also being developed.

Until May 1942, when the RTU system was ordered into effect in the continental air forces, replacements for overseas units were procured by withdrawing qualified personnel from regular units stationed in the United States. This method, though simple, followed no orderly plan and jeopardized effective unit training by removing experienced personnel from U.S.-based groups. In order to establish a sounder method of providing combat replacements, AAF Headquarters directed that certain additional groups be listed as training organizations and maintained at an authorized over-strength to serve as reservoirs from which trained individuals and crews could be withdrawn for overseas shipment.

As was true of the OTU system, many months were required to place the RTU plan into full operation. By the end of 1943, however, when the formation of new groups (except for B-29 units) was virtually completed, RTU operations had become the major activity of the continental air forces. After 1943 the training organization was modified by the merging of personnel from each fixed RTU group with its air base complement; the resultant unit was designated a combat crew training school or station (CCTS).

The RTU system was simpler than the OTU and necessitated few important changes from the traditional organization and administration of combat units. Men designated as replacements were sent to an RTU group (or CCTS), where they received a similar though shorter course than that given in an OTU. Considerably less time was given to integrated activities at the group level, because the trainees of an RTU would not function as a group in combat. As they completed the required phases of training, individuals and crews were drawn from the RTU to serve in established units overseas.

During most of the war, OTU-RTU operations were governed by AAF Headquarters through the domestic air forces, I Troop Carrier Command, and Air Transport Command. Under each of the air forces various subordinate commands, wings, and groups issued instructional directives and supervised OTU-RTU activities. Toward the end of the war, some duplication of effort within each air force was eliminated by restricting to the air force headquarters the issuance of training directives and by limiting the functions of intermediate commands to supervision and inspection.

=== Army Air Forces Base Units ===
By the spring of 1944 the Army Air Forces had found that standard military units, based on relatively inflexible tables of organization, were proving less well adapted to the training mission. Accordingly, it adopted a more functional system in which each base was organized into a separate numbered unit, while the groups and squadrons acting as RTUs were disbanded or inactivated. Known as an Army Air Forces Base Units (AAFBU) the units provided flexibility to subordinate headquarters and freed up manpower for overseas service. The goal was to establish one AAFBU on each training base in the Continental United States. Separate additional base units were authorized to provide personnel overhead for wings, regions, and higher echelons. All organizations on the base were designated as sections (later squadrons) of the AAFBU, identified by letters from "A" to "Z". Personnel were reassigned to the new sections, and the previous squadrons and groups were inactivated or disbanded.

To the numerical designation of the AAFBU, the new units carried a parenthetical suffix that indicated the unit’s function. Because AAFBUs were designated, organized, and discontinued by the commands, air forces, and centers, they were in effect major command-controlled (or MAJCON) units, the first of their kind. Most training airfields were closed after the war ended in 1945 and 1946 and the AAFBUs were discontinued. To prevent duplication in designations, each headquarters was assigned a block of numbers to use when numbering its AAFBUs.

Despite some resistance, the experiment was destined to leave its mark on postwar organization of the United States Air Force (USAF). In September 1947, upon establishment of the USAF, the AAFBUs on permanent Army Air Forces bases became Air Force Base Units (AFBU) upon the base transfer to the USAF. By mid-1948 with the adoption by the USAF of the Hobson Plan Wing-Base organization (as opposed to the AFBU Base organization), the AFBUs were discontinued or redesignated in favor of new USAF four-digit "table of distribution units" established by USAF or the Major Command.

== OTU-RTU Training Programs ==
The types of training conducted by each of the continental air forces OTUs/RTUs varied from time to time according to the needs of the war. Bomber and fighter training was assigned to each continental air force. This was done mainly because the facilities of all air forces were needed to turn out the large number of units and personnel required by the overseas combat air forces; it was done also to facilitate joint fighter and bomber exercises in the later stages of unit training.

- The Second Air Force was assigned the principal mission for developing heavy bombardment groups, while the Third Air Force directed light and medium bombardment, reconnaissance, and air support activities.
- The responsibility of the First and Fourth Air Forces was chiefly the training of fighter units, although initially after the Pearl Harbor Attack First and Fourth Air Forces were tasked with the coastal air defense and the antisubmarine mission. It wasn't until September 1943 that the antisubmarine mission was transferred to the Navy and their full focus was on training.
- I Troop Carrier Command and Air Transport Command performed specialized training for air movement of troops and equipment, along with the aircraft ferrying mission.

Toward the end of the war the scope of responsibility of each Air Force changed when Second Air Force was assigned the B-29 Superfortress very heavy bombardment OTU/RTU training mission; subsequently the B-17/B-24 heavy bombardment RTUs were transferred to Third and Forth Air Forces. In order to accommodate this, II Fighter Command took over some P-51 Mustang RTU training from Fourth Air Force and Third Air Force transferred medium and light bomber RTUs along the Atlantic coast to the First Air Force. II Fighter Command concentrated on training P-51 pilots on over-water very long range escorting of B-29 groups and also on the ground attack missions used to strafe Japanese airfields while the B-29s were over the Japanese Home Islands during their bombing attacks. In addition, pilot transition instruction was transferred to AAF Training Command in the interest of accelerating the production of B-29 units.

=== Bombardment Training Program ===
Since the heavy bomber was the backbone of the American air offensive, the training of crews and units to man the big planes became the primary task of the OTU-RTU system.

==== Heavy/Medium/Light Bomber Training Program ====
The Second Air Force conducted the major portion of B-17/B-24 heavy bombardment training, and divided it into three principal phases. Until the end of 1943 operational training of each of the phases was usually given at a different base. That arrangement was then abandoned in the change to replacement training in favor of giving the entire program at one station. Medium and light bombardment training, which was conducted almost exclusively by the Third Air Force, was similarly divided.

- During the first phase, individual crew members received instruction in their specialties, particular attention being given to instrument and night flying exercises for pilots, cross-country tests for navigators, target runs for bombardiers, and air-to-air firing for gunners.
- During the second phase, teamwork of the combat crew was stressed: bombing, gunnery, and instrument flight missions were performed by full crews.
- The third phase aimed at developing effective unit operation, the goal of the entire program. It included extensive exercises in high-altitude formation flying, long-range navigation, target identification, and simulated combat missions.

Much OTU-RTU instruction was given on the ground-in classrooms, hangars, and on gunnery ranges. Air training was conducted chiefly through informal supervision of flight operations. An experienced navigator, for instance, would accompany a new team on a practice mission. During the course of the trip he would observe the recently graduated navigator, check his techniques, and offer suggestions for improvement. At the conclusion of each mission the “instructor” would file a report on the progress of the “student.” Informal teaching of this kind was the rule for other crew positions, too. Tactics involving the coordinated use of crews, or of larger elements, were often demonstrated by experienced crews before the new units attempted them.

==== B-29 Training Program ====
In 1943, B-29 Superfortress OTU training was assigned to the Second Air Force. Although the organization and techniques of instruction were basically similar in all types of bombardment training, certain features were unique to the B-29 program.

Since particular attention had to be given to the selection of personnel, the usual policy of filling operational units with recent graduates of AAFTC schools was set aside. Instead, pilots and other crew members were selected from those who already had extensive experience in the operation of multi-engine aircraft. Air Transport Command was planned to be the principal source of pilots and navigators with the desired experience, but relatively few men were transferred from ATC to B-29 training. Instead, instructors in the four-engine schools of Army Air Forces Training Command were to constitute the chief reservoir of experienced and available pilots.

The specialized training program began with a five-week curriculum, given prior to crew assignment, for pilots, co-pilots, and flight engineers for the purpose of emphasizing the close teamwork required of these three officers in the operation of a Superfortress. Teams put through this special transition were then assigned to Second Air Force units for integration into full crews. B-29 operational training was divided into the three customary phases but took slightly longer than the B-17/B-24 heavy bombardment training. It was governed by special AAF training standards, which placed increasing emphasis on high-altitude, long-range navigation missions and use of radar equipment.

=== Fighter Training Program ===
Operational training for fighter units followed the standard OTU-RTU pattern, but naturally differed from that of bombardment units. Only in night fighter planes (P-61) did the combat crew consist of more than one member, and the overwhelming proportion of fighter pilots served in the single-seater day fighters. Since the problem of crew teamwork did not exist in day fighter training, the program was directed toward maximum individual proficiency and precise coordination among the pilots of each squadron and group.

Generally P-47 Thunderbolt OTU-RTU training was provided by First Air Force, while P-38 Lightning Training was conducted by Fourth Air Force. In 1943, P-51 Mustang OTU training replaced the P-38 OTUs, as most P-38 units had been deployed overseas, however P-38 RTU, along with P-51 RTU was provided by Fourth Air Force. As the Southwest Pacific Theater had some P-39 Airacobra squadrons deployed, RTU training was provided also by Fourth Air Force.

Although AAFTC eventually gave some transition experience to pilots on combat fighter types, it was generally necessary for First and Fourth Air Force OTU’s to give transition training on whatever aircraft might be available. Following such familiarization, the pilot was required to fly the aircraft in specified acrobatic, aerial bombing, and gunnery exercises, and in simulated individual combat. Navigation missions, instrument flying, and night flying were also prescribed. Stress was placed, especially after 1943, on high-altitude operations and on the development of combat vigilance and aggressiveness.

Unit as well as individual instruction was limited by the pressure of time during the first part of the war. Within the hours available, the greatest attention was paid to take-off and assembly procedures, precision landings in quick succession, formation flying under varying conditions, and the execution of offensive and defensive tactics against air and surface forces, Along with these came instruction on how to maintain aircraft in the field, on procedures for movement to a new base, and on necessary administrative and housekeeping activities.

==== Air-Ground Support/Anti-Aircraft Defensive Training ====
Deficiencies in air-ground teamwork were strikingly revealed in the North African Campaign, and steps were taken in 1943 to provide more effective combined training of air and ground forces.

The I and II Air Support Commands were specifically directed to develop appropriate exercises in cooperation with Army ground infantry and armored units. Light and Medium bombardment, fighter, and observation units, after completing their regular training, were assigned when possible to one of these commands for the desired combined training before deployment overseas. The results of this training became evident after the D-Day landings in France; the Italian Campaign and in the Pacific, the New Guinea campaign; the Philippines Campaign, and the Battle of Okinawa.

Joint exercises between air and anti-aircraft units took the form chiefly of defense against simulated bombardment attacks, and involved the use of fighters, searchlight units, antiaircraft artillery, and aircraft warning systems. By the end of 1943 exercises of this kind were being conducted in the First, Third, and Fourth Air Forces.

==== Heavy Bomber Escort Training ====
It was not too long after its commitment to battle that the Eighth Air Force found that unescorted bombardment meant prohibitive losses. The need was for more training in fighter-bomber cooperation. Such exercises had been carried on to a limited degree before the war, but during the first year after the Pearl Harbor attack they were dropped because of the lack of time.

Early in 1943 the Second and Fourth Air Forces began to provide joint fighter-bomber training as part of defense maneuvers on the Pacific coast. These maneuvers, in which the Navy participated, were simulated attacks by carrier-launched aircraft on various coastal cities. Bomber units with fighter escort sought out the vessels and on the return flight provided targets for interception by fighter units. Since reports from combat theaters continued to stress the need for better teamwork between fighters and bombers on cooperative missions, and for more effective defensive action by bombers against hostile interceptors, the AAF undertook in the fall of 1943 to increase the amount of joint fighter/bomber training and to systematize the program in all the continental air forces.

In order to provide a necessary basis for combined training in all of the domestic air forces, heavy bombardment OTU’s were established in the First and Fourth Air Forces, which had formerly been restricted to fighter units, while fighter OTU’s were activated in the Second Air Force, which had formerly been restricted to bombers. The Third Air Force was already engaged in both types of training on a scale sufficient to permit effective combined exercises.

=== Night Fighter Training Program ===
further information: 481st Night Fighter Operational Training Group

Specialized training in night fighter tactics began in March 1942 upon return of Air Corps observers in England prior to the United States entry into World War II. Upon review of the recommendations presented by the observers, the Air Defense Operational Training Unit was established by Third Air Force on 26 March; it was re-designated as the Interceptor Command School on 30 March. Initially established at Key Field, Mississippi, the school was moved to Orlando Army Air Base, Florida where it became part of the Army Air Force School of Applied Tactics (AAFSAT).

By July 1942, the school received a B-18 Bolo and a number of Douglas P-70 Havocs to initiate the program. By the end of September, AAFSAT had re-designated the program as the Night Fighter Department (Dark). In October, the first two dedicated night fighter training squadrons, the 348th and 349th Night Fighter Squadrons were formed. In January 1943 the school was expanded from Orlando to Kissimmee Army Airfield due to the expansion of AAFSAT and the Fighter Command School. At Kissimmee, the first operational squadrons were activated and Operational Training was carried out by the 348th and 349th. British Bristol Beaufighter night fighters were received for those squadrons programmed for service in Europe. Each squadron was manned with graduates of Training Command advanced flying schools and received eight weeks of training in the two-engine Beaufighters or P-70s.

On 1 April 1943, AAFSAT expanded the Night Fighter Division, placing it under the Air Defense Department, and transferred all training from the Night Fighter Section to the new Division. Beginning in May 1943, orders from HQ AAF were received that the training needed to be expanded to accommodate one new night fighter squadron per month. The school at Kissimmee was expanded with a third OTU, the 420th Night Fighter Squadron at Dunnellon Army Air Field.

With the expansion of the Night Fighter Training Division, tasks were divided into three major functions. The 348th NFS at Orlando AAB provided the initial Operational Training for new Training Command pilots. The 349th at Kissimmee AAF carried out 2-engine transition training, while the 420th at Dunnellon AAF provided Replacement Training (RTU). On 15 July 1943, the 481st Night Fighter Operational Training Group was activated to give the school better organizational structure. In September, the first American-built dedicated night fighter began to arrive, the Northrup YP-61 Black Widow. The YP-61 and a few production P-61As were assigned to the school for both the training programs as well as flight-testing of various torrent/gun configurations. Also a second RTU was established in November when the 424th Night Fighter Squadron was formed.

With the arrival of the P-61 Black Widow, it was decided to move the school to California to be closer to the Northrup manufacturing plant at Hawthorne. The 481st NFOTU and its training squadrons were moved to Hammer Field, near Fresno California on 1 January 1944 and were placed under Fourth Air Force IV Fighter Command. The 319th Wing, activated on 1 April took over the duties of the 481st, disbanding the group and all of its squadrons on 31 March. It was replaced by the 450th Army Air Forces Base Unit as the P-61 RTU, and the squadron designations replaced by letters (A, B, C, D). Night Fighter RTU training continued until the end of August 1945 when the school at Hammer Field was inactivated with the end of the war in the Pacific.

=== Reconnaissance Training ===
Just before the Pearl Harbor attack, Air Corps reconnaissance aviation strength included several reconnaissance squadrons and a single photographic group.

- The observation units, equipped with light, slow aircraft, were used for short-range missions in cooperation with ground forces and were assigned to the air support commands of each air force.
- The reconnaissance units on the other hand, were each attached to a bombardment group and equipped with aircraft of the type assigned to the group. These reconnaissance squadrons, primarily equipped with B-17 Flying Fortresses were to serve primarily as the eyes of the unit and secondarily as bombardment organizations, but in April 1942 all such units were re-designated as bombardment squadrons in anticipation of the assignment of separate photographic groups to the theaters.

The 1st Photographic Group had been created in June 1941 to expand photo-mapping activities in the AAF and to conduct long-range photo reconnaissance after the pattern developed by the British. Each of the four squadrons of the group was assigned to one of the continental air forces. However, the 1st Photographic Group found almost no opportunity for training because as each of its squadrons was busily engaged overseas in carrying out mapping missions for hemisphere defense. It was not until May 1942 that the 2d Photographic Group was established for the purpose of instructing new photographic crews.

After numerous conferences and deliberations, the British model of organization and tactics was adopted. Appropriate OTU-RTU training for production of the new tactical reconnaissance groups was instituted shortly thereafter at Key Field, Mississippi. Photo reconnaissance instruction was similarly affected by British experience. Although the AAF was familiar with the techniques of aerial photography before the war, it learned a great deal from British methods. The commanding officer at Peterson Field, Colorado, who was responsible for initiating the first photo reconnaissance OTU training in 1942, had spent several months in England studying RAF organization and procedures, and his experience there had considerable influence upon the content of the AAF instructional program.

From 1943 until the close of the war reconnaissance operational training was concentrated in the Third Air Force. The OTU-RTU system was followed, as in the case of fighter and bombardment unit training, though it hardly became effective before the program was reduced to production of replacement crews.

- Tactical reconnaissance pilots were required by the training standards to demonstrate navigational skill over land and water, as well as ability to fly on instruments and in all types of formations. They were called upon to perform nearly every defensive and offensive maneuver expected of fighter pilots and were required in addition to master the techniques of artillery adjustment and aerial photography.
- The liaison pilot held an aviation rating restricting him to the operation of small, low-powered aircraft; he was usually the graduate of a special Training Command course, briefer than that for a standard pilot. As members of a unit, liaison pilots had to fly formations and execute desired missions in support of ground forces. These included such activities as limited reconnaissance, courier service, aerial wire laying, artillery adjustment, and air evacuation. An exception were the Air Commando liaison pilots of the 1st, 2d and 3d Air Commando Groups that were deployed to the CBI and to the Philippines. These pilots were specially trained by Third Air Force for combat maneuvers due to their unique missions.

=== Troop Carrier Training ===
Troop Carrier units had the unique mission of dropping airborne parachute units behind enemy lines, along with towing gliders for landing behind enemy lines as the spearheads of invasions and other major ground offensives. Also specially trained ground soldiers did the fighting after the landings, and it was the responsibility of the AAF to make the deliveries of men and supplies.

To carry out these responsibilities was the mission of AAF troop carrier units, serving under theater or task force commanders in cooperation with ground force elements. The training of these units, which had to be able to perform all phases of airborne operations, was the function of I Troop Carrier Command. It was originally activated in April 1942, with the designation of Air Transport Command. Troop carrier headquarters was located throughout the war at Stout Field, Indianapolis, Indiana.

The OTU-RTU system of operational training, used in the fighter and bombardment programs, was also adopted for troop carrier instruction. The task performed by I Troop Carrier Command, while quantitatively smaller than that of other domestic air forces, was nevertheless substantial. In addition to the transport crews, which normally consisted of pilot, co-pilot, navigator, radio operator, and aerial engineer, some 5,000 glider pilots were prepared for their special function.

Following the period of operational training, or during the final portion of it, troop carrier units engaged in combined exercises with elements of the Airborne Command (Army Ground Forces). These realistic maneuvers, which lasted for about two months, were divided into three phases. The first consisted of small-scale operations in which a company of ground soldiers was transported. The scale of movement was increased in the second period, and during the final phase whole divisions were moved as units over distances up to 300 miles.

In each stage of combined training the troop carrier groups placed emphasis upon single-and double-tow of gliders under combat conditions and upon night operations. Attention was given to all types of airborne assignments, including resupply and evacuation by air. By the end of 1944 it was decided to restrict glider instruction to rated power pilots, because they were available in sufficient numbers and could serve a dual purpose in troop carrier units.

=== Ferry Pilots and Transport Crews ===
Probably no other AAF agency had to fly so many different models of aircraft as the Air Transport Command. Its Air Transportation Division depended chiefly upon two models: the steady C-47 Skytrain and the larger, more commodious C-54 Skymaster. However another part of its mission was to provide crews for the ferrying of combat models from factories to points of transfer to specified foreign governments, to AAF bases at home, and eventually to combat areas overseas, This second mission was the responsibly of the ATC Ferrying Division.

==== Air Transportation Division ====
Air transport activity developed as a service primarily to overseas areas, a service which at first was performed largely by the commercial airlines operating under contract with the AAF. By an agreement of July 1942 the airlines established an Airlines War Training Institute as a means of guaranteeing a continuing supply of crews, a but the number thus trained fell short of the need, and the Air Transportation Division of ATC in time had to rely on military personnel.

To provide training for use of its own planes and for the special requirements of its far-flung operations, the division began operating an OTU in 1942, drawing on the graduates of the Training Command advanced two and four-engine flight schools. In the fall of 1943 the Ferrying Division assumed full responsibility for all ATC pilot training.

==== Ferrying Division ====
Ferrying Division found it necessary to provide transition instruction on many planes, in the hope that pilots could qualify on all major U.S. models. A transition school had been established at the Long Beach Army Air Field ferrying base in California as early as July 1941; others were set up in the spring of 1942 at Boeing Field, Seattle, Berry Field, Nashville, Romulus Army Airfield, Detroit, Baltimore Municipal Airport, Maryland, and at Hensley Field, Dallas.

When the Ferrying Division assumed responsibility for all ATC training in October 1943, it established three OTU’s, and a night and instrument training school at Rosecrans Field, Missouri. The OTU school at Homestead Army Air Field, Florida was a four-engine transport school. The Reno Army Air Base, Nevada OTU specialized on training C-47 and C-46 pilots for China-India operations, flying "The Hump" across the Himalayan Mountains.

Although Homestead and Reno conducted full transport crew training, graduation of students was on an individual, rather than crew, basis. A specialized fighter transition OTU for the ATC Ferrying Division was established at Palm Springs Army Airfield, California in November 1943, however it was moved in the spring of 1944 to Brownsville Army Airfield, Texas.

==== Women Airforce Service Pilots (WASPS) ====
When the pilots of the Women’s Auxiliary Ferrying Squadron began to deliver airplanes for the ATC, their activities were limited almost entirely to training and liaison aircraft. During 1943 and 1944 these restrictions were eased, and women pilots were given transition on high-powered types under the same standards of experience and by the same methods as applied to male pilots.

The number of women pilots assigned to the Ferrying Division reached its peak of 303 in April 1944. But by the time they were ready to replace a substantial number of men, in keeping with the original purpose of their organization, victories overseas brought a reduction in military requirements for pilots. Toward the end of 1944 the Women Airforce Service Pilots were accordingly disbanded.

== OTU-RTU Stations ==
See the following articles for station lists, units, type of training provided and aircraft flown

- First Air Force OTU-RTU airfields
- Second Air Force OTU-RTU airfields
- Third Air Force OTU-RTU airfields
- Fourth Air Force OTU-RTU airfields
- I Troop Carrier Command
- Air Transport Command Training airfields

== See also ==
- Army Air Forces Training Command
- List of MAJCOM wings of the United States Air Force
