= 315th Troop Carrier Squadron =

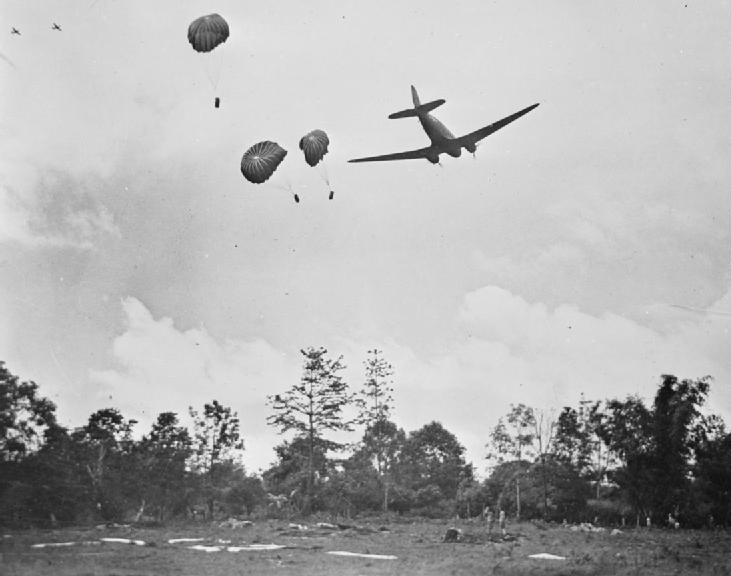
- A Douglas C-47 drops ammunition and rations near Myitkyina, Burma
- Active: 1943–1945; 1948–1949
- Country: United States
- Branch: United States Air Force
- Role: Airlift
- Engagements: China Burma India Theater
- Decorations: Distinguished Unit Citation

The 315th Troop Carrier Squadron is an inactive United States Air Force unit. It was last active with Tenth Air Force, based at Kent County Airport, Michigan, where it was inactivated on 27 June 1949.

== History ==
The squadron was activated in January 1944 in the China Burma India Theater. It was equipped with Douglas C-47 Skytrain transports, and engaged in combat airlift operations in India and Burma. In 1945 it also flew Curtiss C-46 Commandos. It flew combat cargo resupply missions, troop carrier missions, parachute drops and other missions as necessary. The unit participated in the airborne assault of Myitkyina, Burma on 17 May 1944. As part of the 443d Troop Carrier Group, it also performed airlift of an entire Chinese army from Chihkiang to Nanking between 5 and 20 September 1945. During its year and one half in combat, the squadron was twice awarded the Distinguished Unit Citation.

The squadron returned to the United States in December 1945, and was inactivated at the port of embarkation.

The 315th Troop Carrier Squadron was reactivated as a reserve unit under Air Defense Command (ADC) at Kent County Airport, Michigan in June 1948 and assigned to Second Air Force. In 1948 Continental Air Command assumed responsibility for managing reserve and Air National Guard units from ADC. The unit does not appear to have been fully manned or equipped while in the reserves. President Truman's reduced 1949 defense budget required reductions in the number of units in the Air Force. and the 315th was inactivated and not replaced as reserve flying operations at Kent County ceased in 1949.

== Lineage ==
- Constituted as the 315th Troop Carrier Squadron on 8 December 1943

Activated on 1 January 1944
Inactivated on 28 December 1945

- Activated in the reserve on 11 June 1948

Inactivated on 27 June 1949

=== Assignments ===
- Tenth Air Force, 1 January 1944 (attached to Troop Carrier Command, Eastern Air Command)
- 443d Troop Carrier Group, 6 March 1944 – 26 December 1945
- Second Air Force, 11 June 1948
- Tenth Air Force, 1 July 1948
- First Air Force, 15 August 1948
- 433d Troop Carrier Group, 28 October 1948
- Tenth Air Force, 28 March 1949 – 27 June 1949

=== Stations ===
- Dinjan Airfield, India, 1 January 1944
- Sylhet Airfield, India, 10 January 1944
- Sookerating Airfield, India, 10 June 1944
- Moran Airfield, India, 20 June 1944
- Sookerating Airfield, India, 14 July 1944

Detachment operated from Shingbwiyang Airfield, Burma, 13 July 1944 – 8 August 1944
Detachment operated from Ledo Airfield, India, 14 July 1944 – 2 August 1944

- Ledo Airfield, India, 2 August 1944
- Dinjan Airfield, India, 10 May 1945
- Chihkiang Airfield, China, 2 September 1945
- Hankow Airfield, China, 25 September 1945
- Shanghai Airport, China, c. October 1945 – 5 December 1945
- Ft. Lawton, Washington, 27–28 December 1945
- Kent County Airport, Michigan, 11 Jun 1948-27 Jun 1949

=== Aircraft ===
- Douglas C-47 Skytrain, 1944–1945
- Curtiss C-46 Commando, 1945

== See also ==
- List of Douglas C-47 Skytrain operators
