= 57th Weapons Squadron =

US Air Force unit

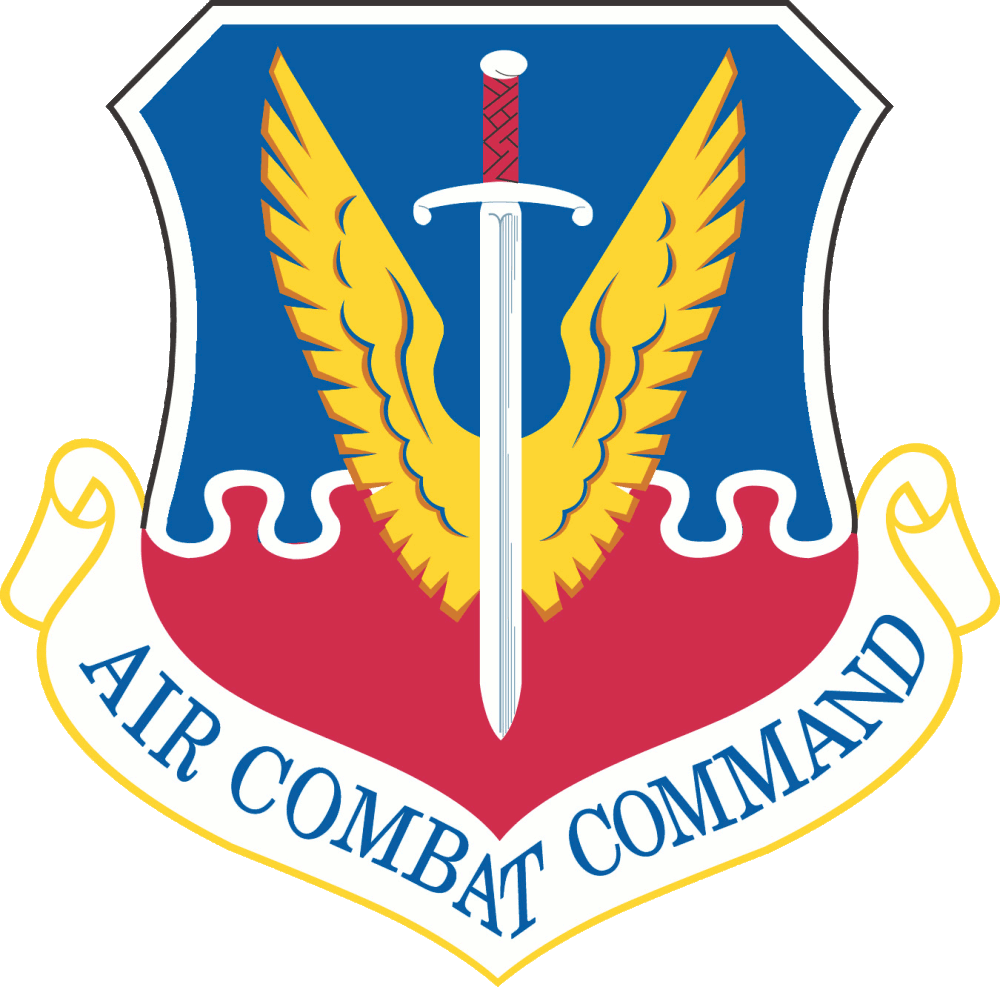
57th Weapons Squadron

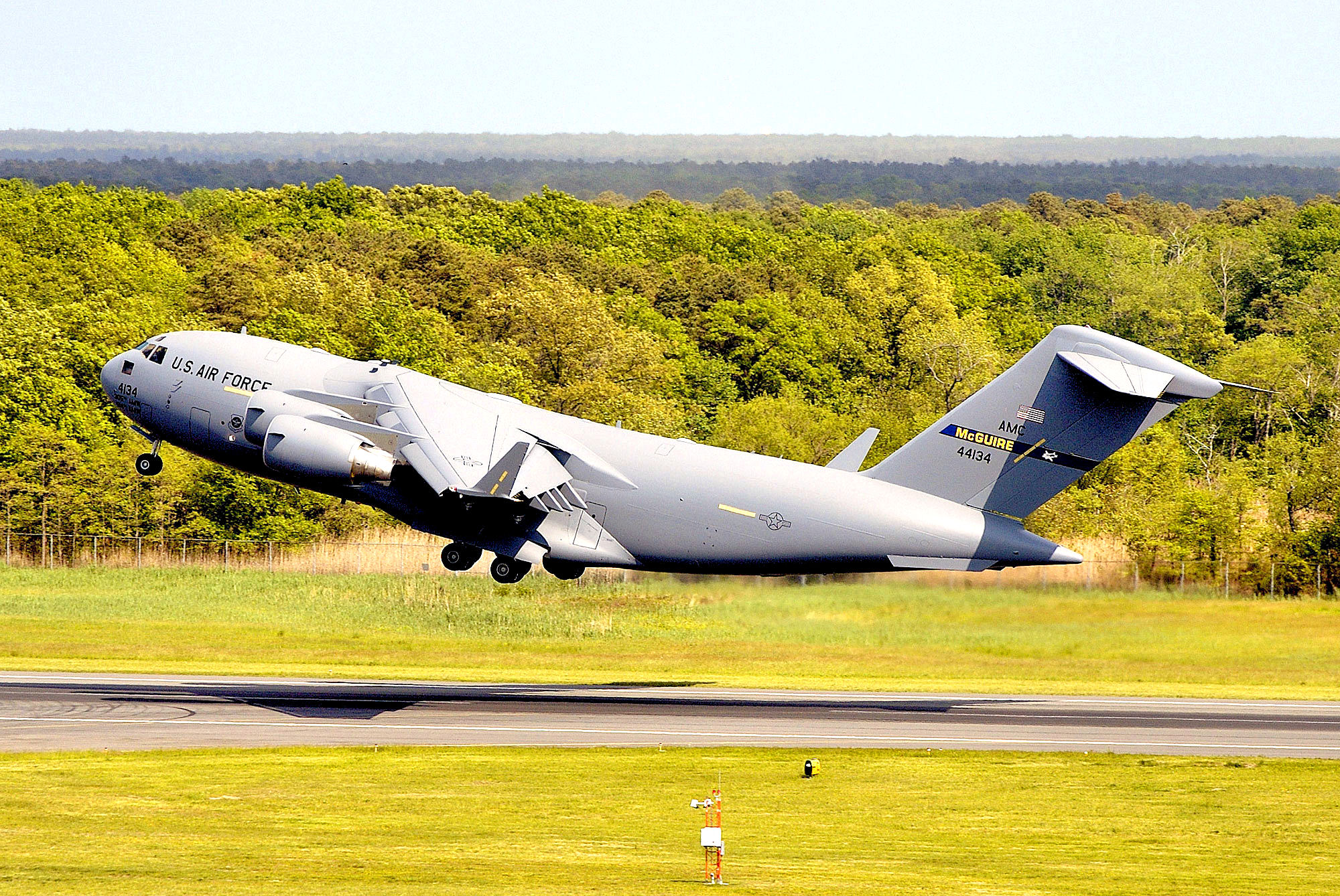
- C-17A Globemaster III taking off from McGuire AFB (Note: Aircraft is Boeing C-17A Globemaster III, serial 04-4134.)
- Active: 1942–1946; 1947–1952; 1952–1954; 1966–2001; 2003–present
- Country: United States
- Branch: United States Air Force
- Role: Advanced airlift training
- Part of: Air Combat Command
- Garrison/HQ: McChord Air Force Base
- Mottos: Professionalism, Safety, Standardization
- Engagements: World War II (Asia-Pacific Theater)

- Decorations: Air Force Outstanding Unit Award (13x) Philippine Presidential Unit Citation (World War II) Republic of Vietnam Gallantry Cross with Palm

Insignia
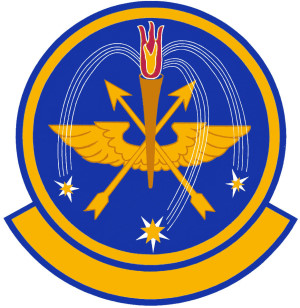
- 57th Weapons Squadron emblem (Note: Approved c. May 1966. This emblem was first approved for the 1741st Air Transport Squadron and was adopted by the 57th as part of the 1741st's heritage.)

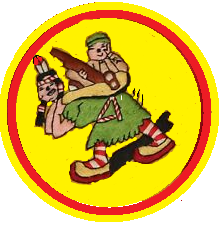
- 57th Troop Carrier Squadron emblem (Note: Used during World War II, but apparently not officially approved. Maurer, Combat Squadrons, p. 230. (No official emblem as of March 1963.))

The 57th Weapons Squadron is a United States Air Force unit. It is assigned to the USAF Weapons School, stationed at the McChord AFB component of Joint Base Lewis-McChord, Washington. The squadron is a geographically separated unit of the 57th Wing at Nellis Air Force Base, Nevada. The mission of the squadron is to provide Boeing C-17 Globemaster III instructional flying.

The squadron was first activated as the 57th Troop Carrier Squadron during World War II. After training in the United States, it moved to the Southwest Pacific Theater, where it provided airlift support, earning a Philippine Presidential Unit Citation. Following V-J Day, it served briefly as part of the occupation forces before inactivating in Japan.

The squadron was activated in the reserve in 1947, and served as a reserve unit until 1954. It was called to active duty during the Korean War, but remained in the United States.

The squadron was activated again in 1966 as the 57th Military Airlift Squadron, when it replaced another squadron providing training to strategic airlift aircrews. It continued the training mission until 2001, when it was inactivated. Two years later, it was activated with its current mission and name.

== History ==
=== World War II ===
Activated in late 1942 under I Troop Carrier Command as a Douglas C-47 Skytrain troop carrier squadron. Deployed to the Southwest Pacific Area, being assigned to Seventh Air Force in New Guinea. The ground echelon left Baer Field on 17 June 1943 and arrived at the Port Moresby Airfield Complex on 31 July.

The 57th moved on 2 August 1943 to the Dobodura Airfield Complex, New Guinea and two days later flew the first mission to Salamaua. Soon after arriving in New Guinea the squadron received the name "Biscuit Bomber" (The name Biscuit Bomber comes from the dropping of food and ammunition to forward locations during WWII). Transported troops, supplies, and equipment to forward bases on New Guinea, New Britain, the Solomon Islands, and the Admiralty Islands. On 2 September, nine of the 57th's planes dropped 90,000 pounds of ammunition, food and equipment to allied troops in the area. Until 23 December 1943, the unit made flights to several locations in New Guinea, as well as Port Moresby and Australia. After 16 October, the air echelon operated from Port Moresby, with the rest of the squadron moving there on 20 December 1943.

Flew armed Boeing B-17F Flying Fortress's from February to May 1944 for the more hazardous missions that involved landing on fields that were under enemy attack. Took part in the first airborne operation in the Southwest Pacific, seizing enemy bases and cutting supply lines at Nadzab, New Guinea, on 5 September 1943. They made the first trip to Morotai Island on 5 October, carrying supplies forward and returning with litter patients

Moved to the Philippines in February 1945, and during the next few months most of its missions were supply flights to ground forces on Luzon and neighboring islands. An additional mission took them to Leyte, Philippine Islands on 31 October to haul supplies to the beachhead and return wounded to hospitals. In January 1945 the unit began the transition to Curtiss C-46 Commando aircraft. It also moved to McGuire Field, Philippines, on 18 February; then to Porac Airfield, Luzon on 19 May. C-46s flew from Clark Field, 15 miles from the squadron's camp.

Transported cargo to forces in the Ryukyus, June–July 1945. After the war, the 57th was used to help transport the 11th Airborne Division to Okinawa. Also ferried liberated prisoners from Okinawa to Luzon. Moved to Tachikawa Airfield near Tokyo Japan in September 1945, flying supply missions and courier flights. Operations continued in Japan until 21 January 1946, when the last of the personnel and equipment transferred to other organizations. The 57th Troop Carrier Squadron inactivated on 25 March 1946.

=== Reserve operations and Korean War mobilization ===
Trained in the Rreserve from August 1947 at Greater Pittsburgh Airport, Pennsylvania, as part of the 375th Troop Carrier Group. The reservists trained in the C-46 Commando until the unit was called to active duty on 15 October 1950, due to the Korean War. After a period of intensive training, the group supplied airlift for troop movements throughout the United States. Immediately, the unit moved to Greenville Air Force Base (later Donaldson Air Force Base), South Carolina, and began flying Fairchild C-82 Packet aircraft on operational troop carrier missions in November 1950.

Between 20 February and 11 April 1952, the unit operated on temporary duty from Brownwood Regional Airport, Texas, in support of Army maneuvers. On 14 July 1952, the 57th inactivated at Donaldson and activated the same day in the reserve at Pittsburgh, Pennsylvania, with the personnel and equipment of the 459th Troop Carrier Squadron, which was inactivated at Pittsburgh. The squadron did little training and inactivated on 1 April 1954.

=== Airlift Training ===
==== Background ====
When Military Air Transport Service (MATS) was formed in June 1948, its main transport training base was located at Great Falls Air Force Base, Montana, a former Air Transport Command base. On 1 June, it organized the 7th Air Transport Squadron there. (Note: This squadron is not related to the 7th Expeditionary Airborne Command and Control Squadron or the 7th Airlift Squadron, each of which has held the designation "7th Air Transport Squadron" at different times.) On 1 October 1948, MATS changed the designations of its table of distribution units to meet Air Force requirements that they be numbered with four digits, and the training squadron became the 1272d Transition Training Unit, then the 1272d Air Transport Squadron (Medium Transition Training Unit) as it focused on training crews on Douglas C-54 Skymasters. The unit was again renumbered in 1949 as the 1741st Air Transport Squadron (Medium Transition Training Unit). (Note: Later, the parenthetical designation was shortened to a simpler ", Training".)

The 1741st remained MATS' training unit for medium airlift aircrew under the 1701st Air Transport Wing until moving to Palm Beach Air Force Base, Florida in April 1953, where it was reassigned to the 1707th Air Transport Wing. It moved to Tinker Air Force Base, Oklahoma with the 1707th Wing in March 1959, where it earned an Air Force Outstanding Unit Award in 1961.

In 1965 MATS decided to convert its Major Command controlled (MAJCON or "four digit") units to Air Force controlled (AFCON) units, which could continue their histories, but was unwilling to let the honors and histories of its MAJCON units die when they were discontinued. Accordingly, when the 1741st was discontinued and replaced by the 57th in January 1966, its history and honors (but not its lineage) were bestowed on the 57th to recognize that the change in numbers was only to implement the MAJCON to AFCON conversion.

==== Crew training unit ====
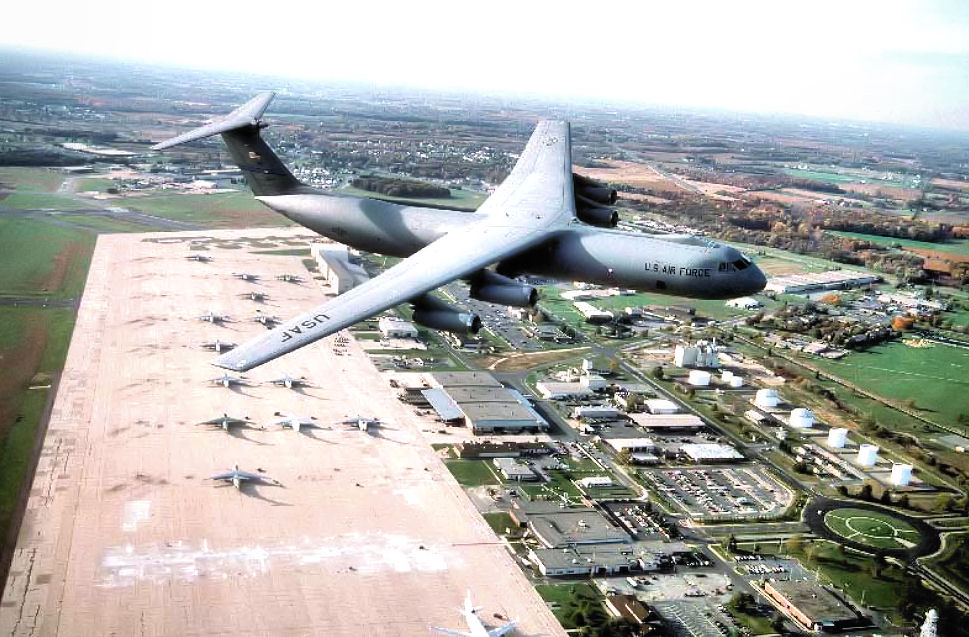
C-141B Starlifter 64-616 performing a flyover of McGuire AFB, New Jersey in the 1990s

The 57th was redesignated the 57th Military Airlift Squadron and replaced the 1741st on 8 January 1966 as a Lockheed C-141 Starlifter training squadron. The 57th trained pilots, navigators, flight engineers and loadmaster) to fly the C-141 turbo-jet transport. They frequently carried cargo and passengers to destinations within the United States on the training flights. The unit also transported cargo and passengers overseas to Japan, West Germany, Guam, Puerto Rico, Hawaii, and Alaska, usually on weekend missions. In later years, additional destinations included Egypt, South Korea, Italy, the Philippines, Spain and Africa.

On 21 April 1969, the squadron relocated to Altus Air Force Base Oklahoma. From there, the squadron took part in numerous humanitarian and operational missions. The squadron regularly flew to Southeast Asia in support of U.S. forces there. Crews and aircraft flew in the Israeli airlift, October–November 1973. In 1975, the 57th flew its first mission to South America. Occasionally the 57th supported the U.S. Army with airdrop missions of paratroopers and supplies.

In December 1979, the unit received the Air Force's first C-141B, and it was given the name the City of Altus. In addition to the stretched fuselage, the aircraft was modified for air refueling capabilities. The squadron also supported the Commander in Chief, Military Airlift Command and his staff in the late 1970s and early 1980s.

Airlift missions to Beirut, Lebanon began in August 1983, in support of peacekeeping forces there. During Desert Shield, Desert Storm, 32 aircrews from the squadron flew more than 4,300 hours on 640 sorties. Additionally, the squadron flew more than 200 sorties and transported more than 3,100 tons of food and supplies in support of the Somalia relief efforts during Operation Restore Hope.

On 1 July 1993, the squadron came under the Air Education and Training Command, which assumed the crew training mission from the operational commands. The squadron was the sole source for initial qualifications and advanced training in C-141 strategic airlift aircraft. It was selectively manned to train C-141 aircrew members in airland, aerial delivery and air refueling. The 57th flew approximately 2,000 sorties and 8,500 hours annually to provide specialized flight training to over 900 students. In addition, the squadron maintained worldwide qualification and participates in most national, USTRANSCOM directed airlift operations until 2001. The squadron was drawn down beginning on 28 July 2001 as initial qualification and upgrade training on the C-141 was transferred to Air Force Reserve Command, and was inactivated on 30 September 2001

=== Weapons and tactics training ===
The squadron was redesignated the 57th Weapons Squadron and reactivated at McGuire Air Force Base, New Jersey as a weapons training squadron for the Boeing C-17 Globemaster III in 2003 as part of the Air Mobility Weapons School. The squadron did not possess aircraft of its own, but used C-17s sourced from Air Mobility Command typically from the 437th Airlift Wing at Joint Base Lindsey Graham, South Carolinaor the 62d Airlift Wing at Joint Base Lewis-McChord to conduct two classes a year of weapons instructors for the Globemaster III. In July 2006, the squadron was reassigned to the USAF Weapons School at Nellis Air Force Base, Nevada, but remained at McGuire until the summer of 2017, when it moved to Joint Base Lewis-McChord, Washington, where the host 62d Wing was better able to provide C-17 support for the squadron.

== Lineage ==
- Constituted as the 57th Troop Carrier Squadron on 12 November 1942

Activated on 18 November 1942
Inactivated on 25 March 1946
Activated in the reserve on 3 August 1947
Redesignated 57th Troop Carrier Squadron, Medium on 27 June 1949
Ordered to active service on 15 October 1950
Inactivated on 14 July 1952
Activated in the reserve on 14 July 1952
Inactivated on 1 April 1954
Redesignated 57th Military Airlift Squadron, Training and activated on 27 December 1965 (not organized)
Organized on 8 January 1966
Redesignated 57th Airlift Squadron on 27 August 1991
Inactivated on 30 September 2001

- Redesignated 57th Weapons Squadron on 30 May 2003

Activated on 1 June 2003

=== Assignments ===
- 375th Troop Carrier Group, 18 November 1942 – 25 March 1946
- 375th Troop Carrier Group, 3 August 1947 – 14 July 1952
- 375th Troop Carrier Group, 14 July 1952 – 1 April 1954
- Military Airlift Command, 27 December 1965 (not organized)
- 443d Military Airlift Wing (later 443d Airlift) Wing), 8 January 1966
- 443d Operations Group, 1 October 1991
- 97th Operations Group, 1 October 1992 – 30 September 2001
- USAF Mobility Weapons School, 1 June 2003
- USAF Weapons School, 5 July 2006 – present

=== Stations ===
- Bowman Field, Kentucky, 18 November 1942
- Sedalia Army Air Field, Missouri, 23 January 1943
- Laurinburg-Maxton Army Air Base, North Carolina, 5 May 1943
- Baer Field, Indiana, 3–17 June 1943
- Port Moresby Airfield Complex, New Guinea, 29 June 1943
- Dobodura Airfield Complex, New Guinea, 2 August 1943
- Port Moresby Airfield Complex, New Guinea, 20 December 1943
- Nadzab Airfield Complex, New Guinea, 22 April 1944
- Mokmer Airfield, Biak, Netherlands East Indies, 23 September 1944 (operated from Peleliu Airfield, Peleliu, 9–26 January 1945)
- McGuire Field, Mindoro, Philippines, 18 February 1945
- Porac Airfield, Luzon, Philippines, 20 May 1945
- Okinawa, 20 August 1945
- Tachikawa Air Base, Japan, 20 September 1945 – 25 March 1946
- Greater Pittsburgh Airport, Pennsylvania, 3 August 1947
- Greenville Air Force Base (later Donaldson Air Force Base), South Carolina, 16 October 1950 – 14 July 1952
- Greater Pittsburgh Airport, Pennsylvania, 14 July 1952 – 1 April 1954
- Tinker Air Force Base, Oklahoma, 8 January 1966
- Altus Air Force Base, Oklahoma, 21 April 1969 – 30 September 2001
- McGuire Air Force Base (part of Joint Base McGuire-Dix-Lakehurst), New Jersey, 1 June 2003
- McChord Air Force Base (part of Joint Base Lewis-McChord), Washington, July 2017 – present

=== Aircraft ===
- Douglas C-47 Skytrain, 1942–1945
- Boeing B-17 Flying Fortress, 1944
- Curtiss C-46 Commando, 1944–1946, 1947–1950, 1953–1954
- Fairchild C-82 Packet, 1950–1952
- Lockheed C-141 Starlifter, 1966–2001
- Boeing C-17 Globemaster III, 2003–present
