= 332d Airlift Flight =

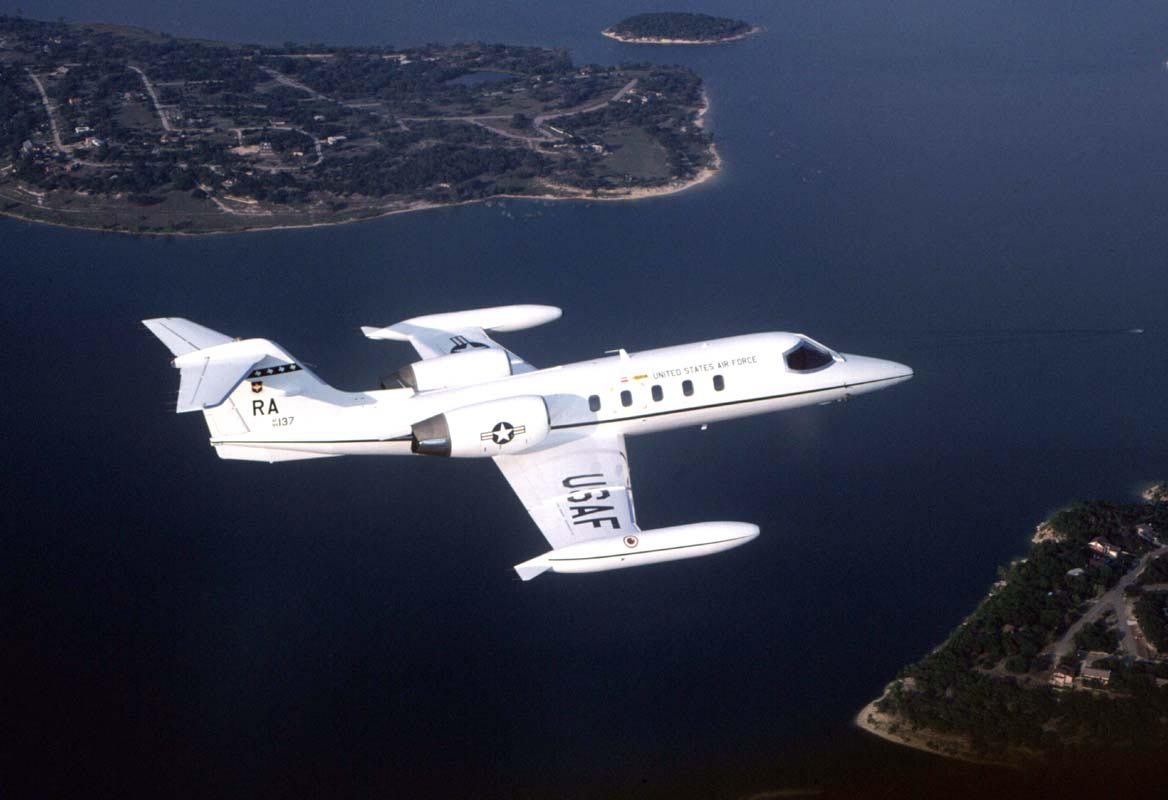
- Learjet C-21A of the 12th Flying Training Wing
- Active: 1944–1947; 1948–1949; 1955–1958; 1993–2004
- Country: United States
- Branch: United States Air Force
- Role: Airlift
- Engagements: China-Burma-India Theater
- Decorations: Distinguished Unit Citation; Air Force Outstanding Unit Award

Insignia
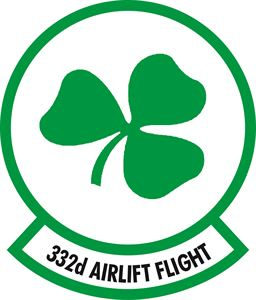
- 332d Airlift Flight emblem (approved 26 March 1957)

The 332d Airlift Flight is an inactive United States Air Force unit. it was first organized in India in 1944 as the 11th Combat Cargo Squadron. As the 332d Troop Carrier Squadron it remained in China through 1947. The squadron was activated again for the Berlin Airlift from 1948 to 1949.

The squadron was active again from 1955 to 1958 as an assault airlift unit, operating the Fairchild C-123 Provider. Its last period of active service was from 1993 to 2004 providing operational support airlift with C-21 Learjets.

== History ==
=== World War II ===
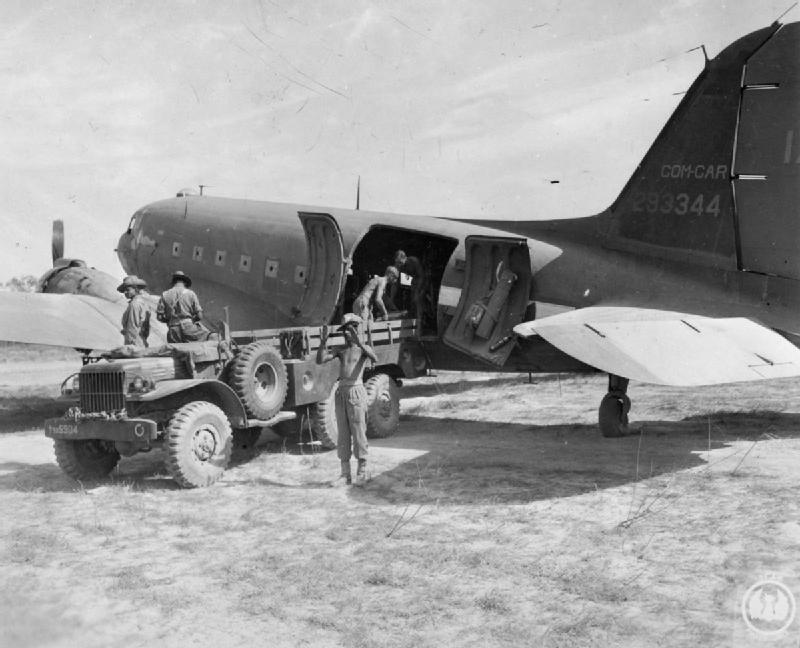
British troops unload a combat cargo C-47 in Burma

The squadron was first activated in India in June 1944 as the 11th Combat Cargo Squadron, one of the original squadrons of the 3d Combat Cargo Group. The squadron equipped with Douglas C-47 Skytrains and was attached to the 443d Troop Carrier Group shortly after the squadron was organized. The squadron provided airlift support for the Allies in their efforts to control northern Burma, then in their drive southward.

In May 1945, the squadron moved its operations from India to China. It was awarded the Distinguished Unit Citation following V-J Day for its actions in China, Mongolia and Vietnam in September 1945. From October through December 1945, it airlifted Chinese troops to eastern China for the disarmament of Japanese troops locate there.

Beginning in January 1946, the squadron provided transportation for General George C. Marshall, who was attempting to resolve the civil war between the Nationalist and Communist forces seeking to control China. These efforts proved unsuccessful and were terminated in early 1947 and the squadron was inactivated in April of that year.

=== Berlin Airlift ===
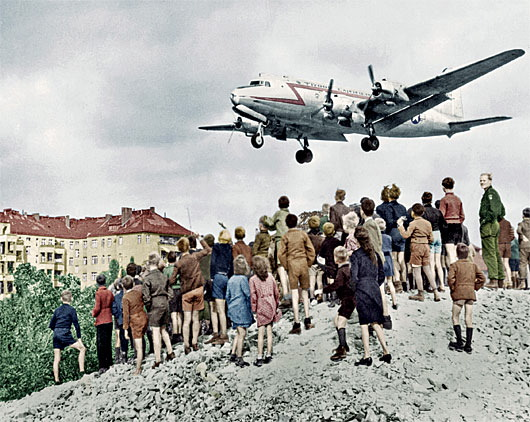
C-54 landing at Tempelhof Central Airport

The squadron was activated a second time as the Air Force replaced its provisional 1422d Air Transport Group in November 1948 with the 513d Troop Carrier Group to operate its Douglas C-54 Skymasters flying from Rhein-Main Air Base, Germany to support the Berlin Airlift. The squadron flew food and supplies to West Berlin. The Soviets ended their blockade of Berlin in May 1949, but airlift operations continued through September in order to create a stockpile should the Soviets resume the blockade. With the end of the airlift, air transport forces in Germany were drawn down and the squadron was inactivated in October of that year.

=== Assault airlift ===
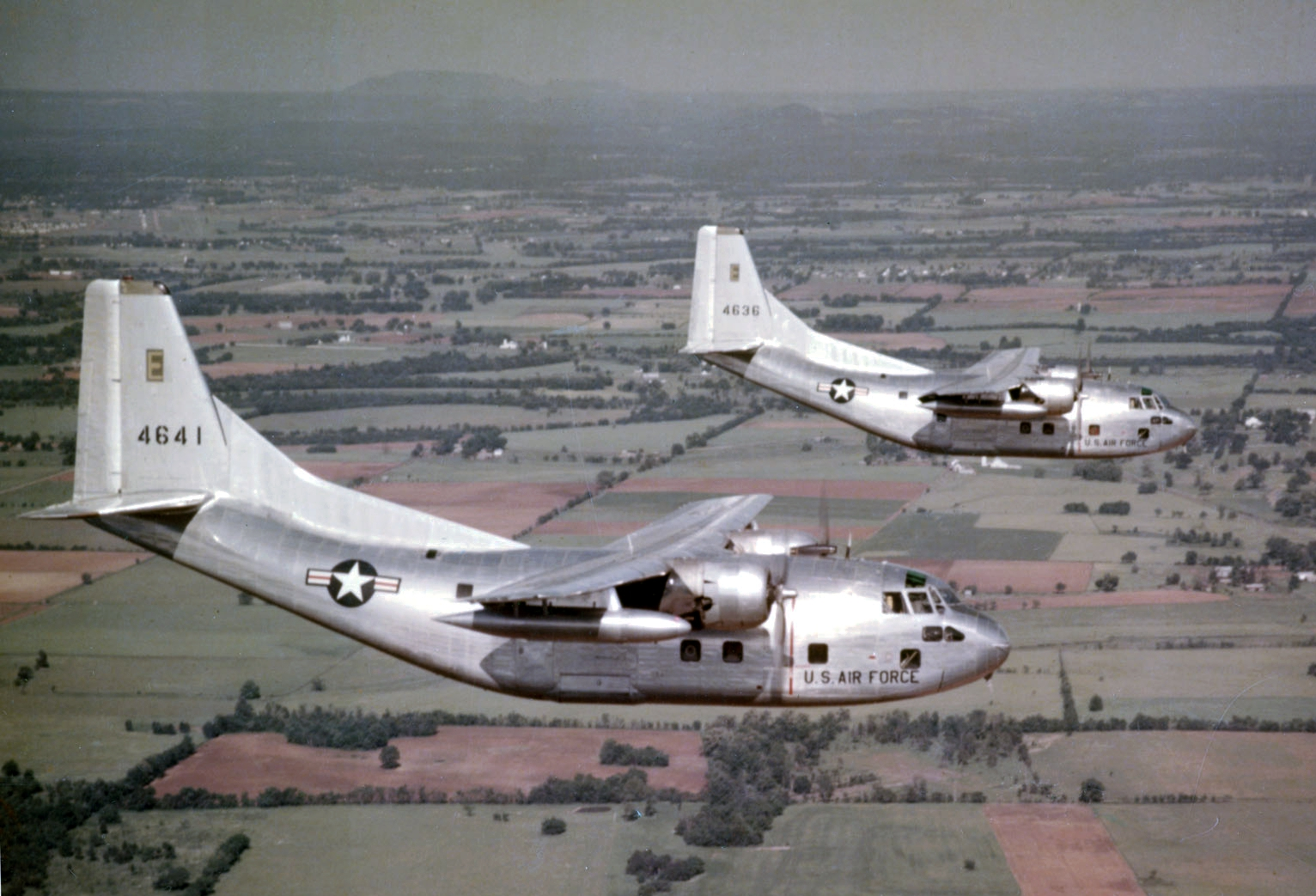
C-123B Providers in formation during the 1950s (Note: Aircraft are Fairchild C-123B-7-FA Providers, serials 54-636 and 54-641)

The squadron was activated again at Sewart Air Force Base, Tennessee as an assault airlift unit. Although initially equipped with Fairchild C-119 Flying Boxcars, it soon transitioned to the Fairchild C-123 Provider. The squadron participated in numerous exercises to maintain proficiency in assault airlift operations. In October 1957, Tactical Air Command converted its tactical units to the dual deputy organization and the squadron was reassigned from the 513th Group to the 513th Troop Carrier Wing. The squadron was inactivated in 1958 as Sewart became a Lockheed C-130 Hercules base.

=== Operational support airlift ===
The squadron was redesignated the 322d Airlift Flight and activated with C-21 Learjets at Randolph Air Force Base, Texas in April 1993. It was initially assigned to the 12th Operations Group at Randolph, but in 1997, operational support flights were transferred to Air Mobility Command (AMC) and the flight came under the 458th Airlift Squadron, located at Scott Air Force Base, Illinois. The squadron provided airlift support, primarily to senior members of Air Education and Training Command. Most of the flight's pilots were new pilots, who were also able to gain experience on an aircraft whose operating costs were lower than tactical airplanes.

The squadron's mission included aeromedical evacuation. The use of the small C-21, rather than larger Douglas HC-9 Nightingales resulted in savings when missions called for transportation of single patients or small medical teams. The flight kept a plane on alert on a rotating basis with its parent 458th Squadron. The squadron was inactivated in September 2004, when AMC consolidated the operations of its eight operational airlift flights into four squadrons.

== Lineage ==
- Constituted as the 11th Combat Cargo Squadron on 1 June 1944

Activated on 5 June 1944
Redesignated 332d Troop Carrier Squadron on 29 September 1945
Inactivated on 10 April 1947

- Redesignated 332d Troop Carrier Squadron, Special on 19 November 1948

Activated on 19 November 1948
Inactivated on 16 October 1949

- Redesignated 332d Troop Carrier Squadron, Assault, Fixed Wing on 30 June 1955

Activated on 8 November 1955
Redesignated 332d Troop Carrier Squadron, Assault on 1 July 1958
Inactivated on 1 December 1958

- Redesignated 332d Airlift Flight on 1 April 1993

Activated 15 April 1993
Inactivated on 15 September 2004

=== Assignments ===
- 3d Combat Cargo Group, 5 June 1944 (attached to 443d Troop Carrier Group, 16 June–12 August 1944)
- Fourteenth Air Force, c. 1 May 1945
- 513th Troop Carrier Group, c. 1 November 1945
- Army Air Forces, China 15 April 1946 (under operational control of Peiping Headquarters Command)
- United States Army Forces, China, 20 June 1946 – 10 April 1947 (under operational control of Peiping Headquarters Command)
- 513th Troop Carrier Group, 19 November 1948 – 16 October 1949
- 513th Troop Carrier Group, 8 November 1955
- 513th Troop Carrier Wing, 8 October 1957 – 1 December 1958 (Note: Maurer gives the date of reassignment from the 513th Group to the 513th Wing as 1 July 1958. Maurer, Combat Squadrons, pp. 60-61. However, the group was inactivated when it was replaced by the wing in October 1957. Ravenstein, pp. 279-281; Haulman, Factsheet 513 Air Control Group.)
- 12th Operations Group, 15 April 1993
- 458th Airlift Squadron, 1 April 1997 – 15 September 2004

=== Stations ===
- Sylhet Airfield, India, 5 June 1944
- Dinjan Airfield, India, 6 June 1944 (detachment operated from Sookerating Airfield, India, 16 June–14 July 1944)
- Yunnani Airfield, China, 14 May 1945
- Luliang Airfield, China, 20 June 1945
- Shanghai Airport, China, 12 October 1945
- Peiping Airport, China, 20 April 1946 – 10 April 1947
- Rhein-Main Air Base, Germany, 19 November 1948 – 16 October 1949
- Sewart Air Force Base, Tennessee, 8 November 1955 – 1 December 1958
- Randolph Air Force Base, Texas, 15 April 1993 – 15 September 2004

=== Aircraft ===
- Douglas C-47 Skytrain, 1944–1947
- Curtiss C-46 Commando, 1945–1947
- Douglas C-54 Skymaster, 1948–1949
- Fairchild C-119 Flying Boxcar, 1955–1956
- Fairchild C-123 Provider, 1956–1958
- C-21 Learjet, 1993-2004
