= 443d Operations Group =

- Active: 1943–1945; 1949–1953; 1991–1992
- Country: United States
- Branch: United States Air Force

The 443d Operations Group is an inactive United States Air Force unit. Its last assignment was with the 443d Airlift Wing, being inactivated at Altus Air Force Base, Oklahoma on 1 October 1992.

== History ==
For related history and lineage, see 443d Airlift Wing

Formed during World War II, the 443d Troop Carrier Group deployed to the China-Burma-India Theater of Operations in 1944 and using C-47s and sometimes gliders to transport Allied troops, evacuate wounded personnel, and haul supplies and materiel, including gasoline, oil, signal and engineering equipment, medicine, rations, and ammunition. The group's missions were concerned primarily with support for Allied forces that were driving southward through Burma, but the 443d also made flights to China. It moved to China in August 1945 and received a Distinguished Unit Citation for transporting men from Chihkiang to Nanking in September 1945.

=== World War II ===
The 443d Troop Carrier Group was established on 25 May 1943 and activated on 1 October as a Troop Carrier unit, being equipped with the C-47/C-53 Skytrain at Sedalia AAF, Missouri. Once training was completed the group transferred to Tenth Air Force in India, in February 1944 in the China Burma India Theater.

When the 443d arrived in India Combat Cargo Groups were being organized, and the group's personnel and aircraft were assigned to the 1st Combat Cargo Group. New squadrons were assigned, and, the group used C-47s and sometimes gliders to transport Allied troops, evacuate wounded personnel, and haul supplies and materiel, including gasoline, oil, signal and engineering equipment, medicine, rations, and ammunition.

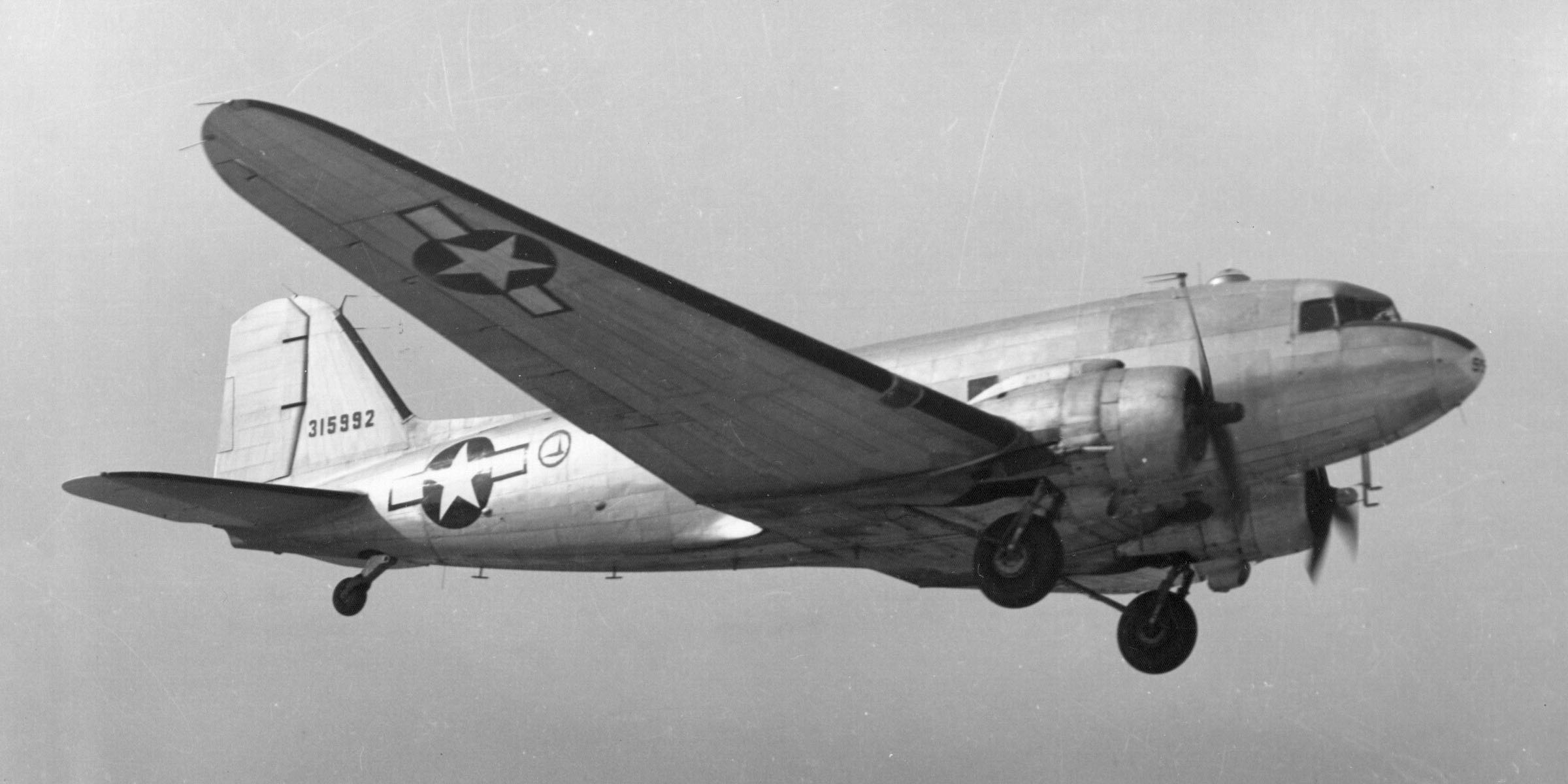
Douglas C-47 Skytrain in flight, 1940s

The group's missions were concerned primarily with support for Allied forces that were driving southward through Burma but the 443rd also made many flights to China. When General Joseph Stilwell was ready to begin the retaking of Burma, his forces were to fight across the northern Burmese mountains to the village of Naga. From there they would head down the Hukawng Valley toward the Japanese stronghold at Mogaung, then they would head to Myitkyina.

At the same time Generalissimo Chiang Kai-shek, would attack Burma from China's western mountainous border. British General Orde Wingate and his "Chindits" were ready to begin their push into Burma with a goal of establishing permanent areas of occupation behind Japanese lines. British General William Slim was to bring his troops from Arakan, India into Burma. The final objective of this three-pronged attack was the town Myitkyina. All these operations were to be largely supplied by air-support provided by the 443d and the 177th wing of the Royal Air Force.

The unit was reassigned to Fourteenth Air Force in January and moved to China in August 1945, and received a Distinguished Unit Citation for transporting a Chinese army of more than 30,000 men from Chihkiang to Nanking in September 1945.

Returned to the United States in December, and, inactivated on 26 December 1945 at Camp Anza, California.

=== Cold War ===
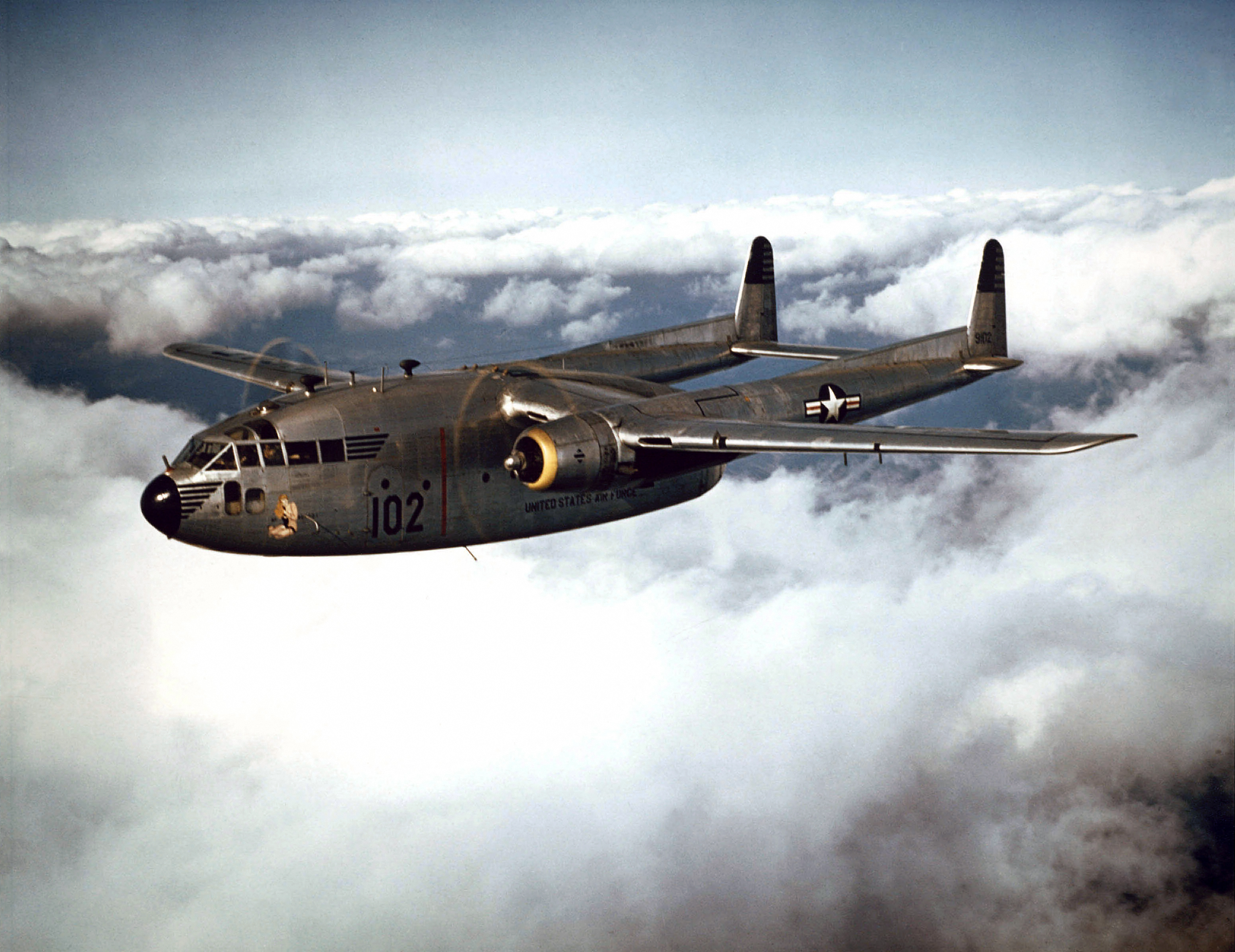
Fairchild C-119 Flying Boxcar in flight, 1952

The 443d trained as a Reserve troop-carrier unit under the supervision of the 2596th Air Force Reserve Training Center from June 1949 to April 1951.

The 443d was brought to active duty at Donaldson Air Force Base, South Carolina on 9 August 1951 as a training wing by Tactical Air Command. For almost two years, the 443d participated in tactical exercises in operations, training troop-carrier aircrews using C-46 Commandos for assignment to the Far East and worked closely with other troop-carrier groups to test and evaluate new troop-carrier doctrine and procedures. With the nearing end of the Korean War, the 443d was inactivated on 1 February 1953.

As part of the Air Force's Objective Wing reorganization, the 443d was redesignated the 443d Operations Group and activated on 1 October 1991, being assigned the operational squadrons of the 443d Airlift Wing. A year later, it was inactivated and its mission, personnel and equipment were reassigned to the 97th Operations Group.

== Lineage ==
- Constituted as 443rd Troop Carrier Group on 25 May 1943

Activated on 1 October 1943
Inactivated on 26 December 1945

- Redesignated: 443d Troop Carrier Group (Medium) and allotted to the reserve

Activated in the Reserve on 27 June 1949
Ordered to active service on 1 May 1951
Inactivated on 1 February 1953
Redesignated 443d Military Airlift Group in 1985

- Redesignated 443d Operations Group in 1991

Activated on 1 October 1991
Inactivated on 1 October 1992

- Redesignated 443d Expeditionary Operations Group and converted to provisional statuson 12 June 2002

=== Assignments ===
- Second Air Force, 1 October 1943
- Tenth Air Force, 15 February 1944
- Fourteenth Air Force, 28 August – 30 November 1945
- Army Service Forces, 23 – 26 December 1945
- 443d Troop Carrier Wing, 27 June 1949 – 1 February 1953
- 443d Airlift Wing, 1 October 1991 – 1 October 1992
- Air Mobility Command to activate or inactivate as needed

=== Components ===
- 1st Troop Carrier Squadron, 6 March 1944 – 18 December 1945
- 2d Troop Carrier Squadron, 6 March 1944 – 18 December 1945
- 11th Combat Cargo Squadron, 16 June – 12 August 1944 (Attached)
- 27th Troop Carrier Squadron, 6 March 1944 – 27 December 1945
- 56th Airlift Squadron, 1 October 1991 – 1 October 1992
- 57th Airlift Squadron, 1 October 1991 – 1 October 1992
- 309th Troop Carrier Squadron, 1 October 1943 – 15 February 1944; 27 June 1949 – 1 February 1953
- 310th Troop Carrier Squadron, 1 October 1943 – 15 February 1944; 27 June 1949 – 1 February 1953
- 315th Troop Carrier Squadron, 6 March 1944 – 27 December 1945
- 322d Troop Carrier Squadron, 4 September – 1 December 1945 (Attached)
- 343d Troop Carrier Squadron, 27 June 1949 – 1 February 1953
- 344th Troop Carrier Squadron, 27 June 1949 – 8 August 1951
- 443d Operations Support Squadron, 1 October 1991 – 1 October 1992

=== Stations ===
- Sedalia Army Air Field, Missouri, 1 October 1943
- Alliance Army Air Field, Nebraska, 19 January 1944
- Sylhet Airfield, India, 15 February 1944
- Sookerating Airfield, India, 6 June 1944
- Dinjan Airfield, India, 9 July 1944
- Ledo Airfield, India, 8 October 1944
- Dinjan Airfield, India, 11 May 1945
- Chihkiang Airfield, China, 28 August 1945
- Hankow Airfield, China, 25 September – 30 November 1945
- Camp Anza, California, 23 – 26 December 1945
- Hensley Field, Texas, 27 June 1949
- Donaldson Air Force Base, South Carolina, 9 August 1951 – 1 February 1953
- Altus Air Force Base, Oklahoma, 1 October 1991 – 1 October 1992

=== Aircraft ===
- Douglas C-47 Skytrain, 1943–1945
- Douglas C-53 Skytrooper, 1943–1945
- Curtiss C-46 Commando, 1949–1952
- Fairchild C-119 Flying Boxcar, 1952–1953
- Lockheed C-141 Starlifter, 1991–1992
- Lockheed C-5 Galaxy, 1991–1992
