= 84th Airlift Flight =

84th Airlift Flight

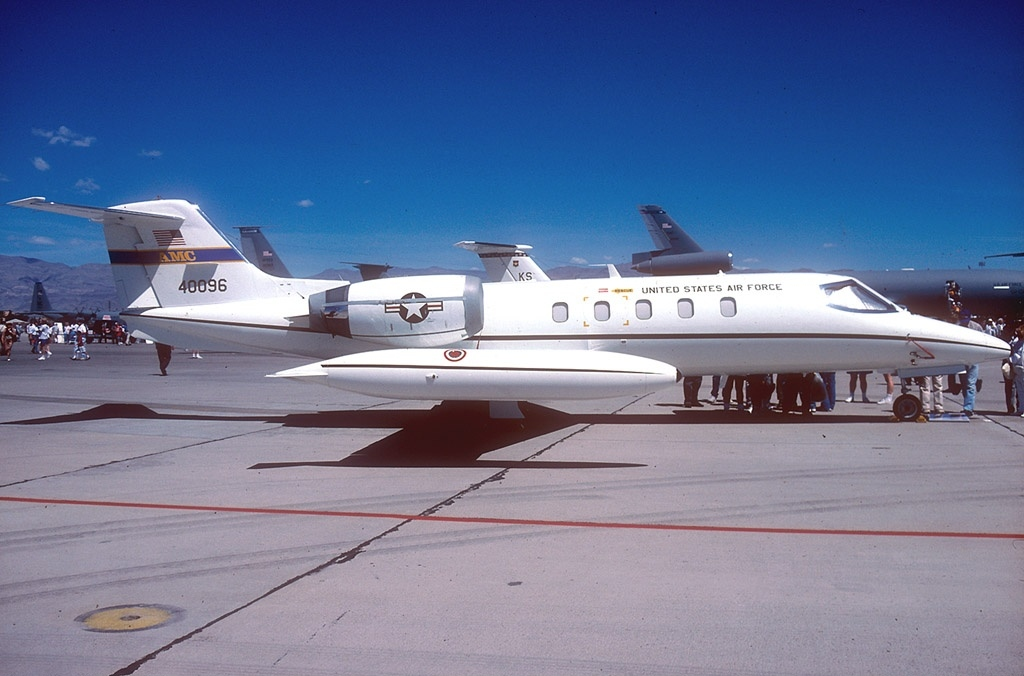
- Learjet C-21A as flown by the 84th
- Active: 1943–1945; 1947–1952; 1952–1957; 1993–2005
- Country: United States
- Branch: United States Air Force
- Role: Airlift
- Part of: Air Force Space Command
- Engagements: European Theater of Operations; Korean War
- Decorations: Distinguished Unit Citation; Air Force Outstanding Unit Award; Republic of Korea Presidential Unit Citation

The 84th Airlift Flight is an inactive United States Air Force unit. Its last assignment was with the 21st Operations Group at Peterson Air Force Base, Colorado, where it was inactivated in June 2005. It served in World War II and the Korean War as well as providing airlift services for a short time.

== History ==
=== World War II ===
Activated in May 1943 under I Troop Carrier Command and equipped with Douglas C-47 Skytrains. Trained in various parts of the eastern United States until the end of 1943. Deployed to England and assigned to IX Troop Carrier Command, Ninth Air Force.

Prepared for the invasion of Nazi-occupied Europe. During the Normandy campaign, the group released gliders over Cherbourg Naval Base and carried troops, weapons, ammunition, rations, and other supplies for the 82nd Airborne Division in Operation Neptune.

Deployed to Italy in July 1944 and participated in the Allied invasion of southern France in August 1944 dropping paratroops of the 1st Airborne Task Force.

During Operation Market Garden in September 1944, the group released gliders carrying troops and equipment for the airborne attack in the occupied Netherlands. In December 1944, the group re-supplied the 101st Airborne Division in the Bastogne area of Belgium during the Battle of the Bulge. After moving to France in February 1945, the unit released gliders in support of an American crossing of the Rhine River called Operation Varsity in March 1945.

Evacuated wounded personnel to rear-zone hospitals. After V-E Day, the group evacuated prisoners of war and displaced persons to relocation centers. Returned to the United States in August 1945, became a transport squadron for Continental Air Command until inactivation in November 1945.

=== Air Force reserve and Korean mobilization ===
Postwar the squadron was activated in the air force reserve in 1947 at Orchard Place Airport, Illinois, operating C-46 Commandos for Tactical Air Command Eighteenth Air Force.

Became part of Far East Air Forces in 1951 in Japan. Equipped with Fairchild C-119 Flying Boxcars and engaged in combat operations in the Korean Peninsula. Dropped 2nd Ranger Infantry Company (Airborne) troops near Munsan-Ni, inactivated in June 1952 as part of a reorganization of airborne troop carrier units in Japan

=== Return to reserve status ===
Returned to reserve status, reactivated at O'Hare International Airport, Illinois in June 1952. Inactivated in November 1957 as a result of the closure of O'Hare to military air traffic.

=== Operational support airlift ===
The squadron was redesignated the 84th Airlift Flight and activated at Peterson Air Force Base, Colorado to provide operational support airlift, primarily for senior personnel of Air Force Space Command and North American Aerospace Defense Command. It was inactivated in June 2005 and its mission, personnel and Learjet C-21 aircraft were transferred to the 311th Airlift Squadron, which moved to Peterson on paper from Offutt Air Force Base, Nebraska.

== Lineage ==
- Constituted as the 84th Troop Carrier Squadron on 15 April 1943

Activated on 1 May 1943
Inactivated on 15 November 1945

- Activated in the reserve on 12 June 1947

Redesignated 84th Troop Carrier Squadron, Medium on 27 June 1949
Ordered into active service on 10 August 1950
Inactivated on 10 June 1952

- Activated in the reserve on 15 June 1952

Inactivated on 16 November 1957

- Redesignated 84th Airlift Flight on 29 October 1993

Activated on 1 November 1993
Inactivated on 15 June 2005

=== Assignments ===
- 437th Troop Carrier Group, 1 May 1943 – 15 November 1945
- Second Air Force, 12 June 1947
- Tenth Air Force, 1 July 1948
- 437th Troop Carrier Group, 27 June 1949 – 10 June 1952
- 437th Troop Carrier Group, 15 June 1952 – 16 November 1957
- 21st Operations Group, 1 November 1993
- 458th Airlift Squadron, 1 Apr 1997 – 15 June 2005

=== Stations ===
- Baer Field, Indiana, 1 May 1943
- Sedalia Army Air Field, Missouri, 8 June 1943
- Pope Field, North Carolina, 9 October 1943
- Baer Field, Indiana, 31 December 1943 – January 1944
- RAF Balderton (AAF-482), England, 20 January 1944
- RAF Ramsbury (AAF-469), England, 6 Feb 1944 (operated from Montalto Di Castro Airfield, Italy, 19 July–23 August 1944
- Coulommiers-Voisins Airfield (A-58), France, February–July 1945
- Baer Field, Indiana, 13 August 1945
- Marfa Army Air Field, Texas, 14 September–15 November 1945
- Orchard Place Airport (later O'Hare International Airport), Illinois, 3 September 1947
- Shaw Air Force Base, South Carolina, 14 August–16 October 1950
- Brady Air Base, Japan, 8 November 1950 – 10 Jun 1952
- O'Hare International Airport, Illinois, 15 June 1952 – 16 November 1957
- Peterson Air Force Base, Colorado, 1 November 1993 – 15 June 2005

=== Aircraft ===
- Douglas C-47 Skytrain, 1943–1945, 1947–1949
- Curtiss C-46 Commando, 1949–1950, 1955–1957
- Fairchild C-119 Flying Boxcar, 1951–1952
- Learjet C-21, 1993-2005
