= 311th Airlift Squadron =

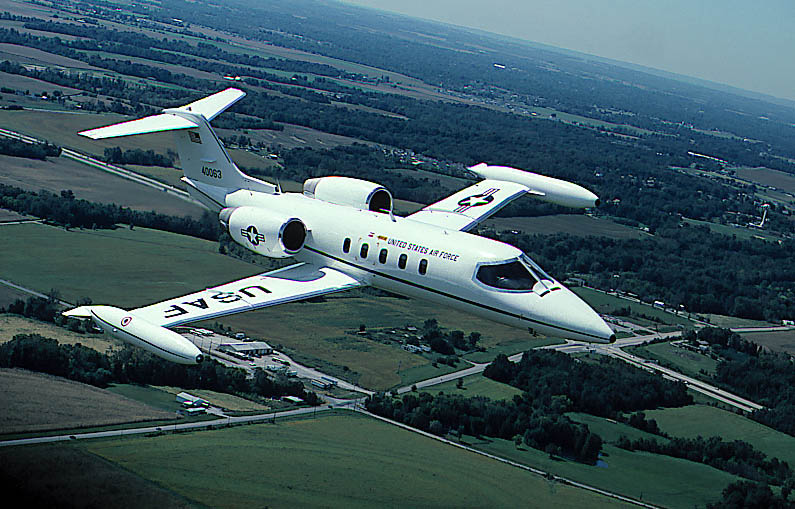
- 375th Operations Group C-21 Learjet
- Active: 1943–1946; 1949–1951; 1963–1971; 1997–2014
- Country: United States
- Branch: United States Air Force
- Role: Airlift
- Motto(s): Always First Without Fear (Note: This motto was earlier in Latin "Prior Semper Sine Timore.")
- Engagements: Vietnam War
- Decorations: Presidential Unit Citation; Air Force Outstanding Unit Award; Republic of Vietnam Gallantry Cross with Palm

Insignia
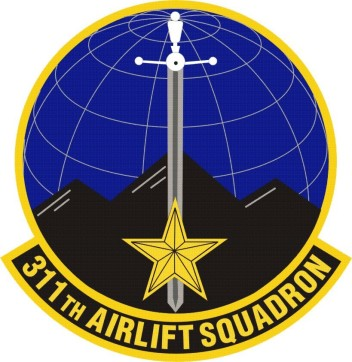
- 311th Airlift Squadron emblem (Note: Approved 13 June 2005.)

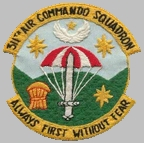
- Patch with 311th Air Commando Squadron emblem (Note: Approved 29 September 1965.)

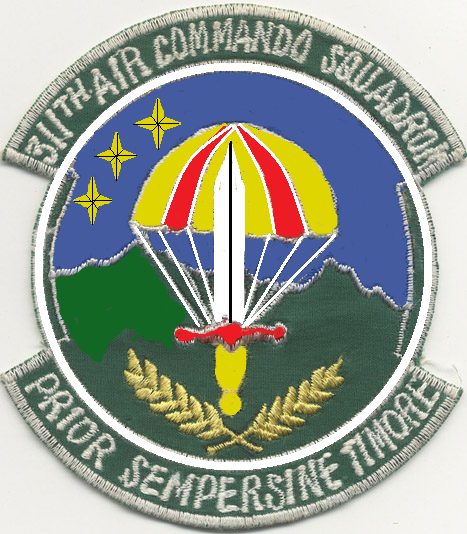
- 311th Air Commando Squadron emblem (early)

The 311th Airlift Squadron was part of the 375th Airlift Wing at Peterson Air Force Base, Colorado. It operated Learjet C-21 aircraft providing executive airlift for Combatant Commanders.

== History ==
=== World War II ===
The 311th Troop Carrier Squadron trained in the United States from 1943 to 1944 and later flew cargo and personnel missions. It transferred to Hawaii in February 1945 and flew cargo in the Hawaiian Islands. When Lieutenant General Millard Harmon crashed in the Pacific, the squadron participated in an intensive air search for survivors. In August 1945 it moved to Okinawa and continued its airlift mission until May 1946.

=== Air Force reserve ===
The 311th trained in C-46 aircraft from June 1949 – April 1951.

=== Vietnam War ===
In Vietnam, the 311th flew cargo and passengers in support of I and II Corps. In addition, the unit flew flare, communications cover, air evacuation, and search and rescue missions for downed aircraft.

On 10 May 1968, The special forces camp at Kham Duc in the central highlands near Laos came under heavy mortar fire and was ordered to be evacuated. On 12 May, during evacuation efforts, an Army Boeing CH-47 Chinook and two division C-130s were disabled by enemy fire. One C-130 burst into flames at the end of the runway, killing all aboard. The final C-130 took off thinking it had boarded the last of the men on the ground. As the Viet Cong overran the forward outpost and established gun positions on the airstrip, eight aircraft were destroyed and the C-130 on the runway reduced its usable length to only about 2,200 feet. However, the three-man combat control team, in charge of directing the evacuation, was still on the ground searching for survivors.

Informed that three men remained behind, Lt Col Joe M. Jackson of the 311th Air Commando Squadron (834th Air Division) dove his Fairchild C-123K Provider from 9,000 to land at the field. Unable to slow by reversing his propellers (Reversing the propellers on the C-123K shut off the two jet engines. They would have to be restarted before the aircraft could begin to take off again.) he jammed on the brakes and skidded halfway down the runway. The three combat controllers jumped from a culvert next to the runway and leaped into the open rear cargo door. A 122 mm rocket, fired from just outside the perimeter stopped only 10 meters from the plane. It did not explode. Jackson taxied around the shell and took off under heavy fire from the hills on either side of the camp. For this rescue, he was awarded the Medal of Honor.

=== Operational support airlift ===
The squadron was redesignated the 311th Airlift Flight and activated at Offutt Air Force Base, Nebraska in April 1997, assuming the mission, personnel and Learjet C-21 aircraft of the inactivating 11th Airlift Flight, when Air Force operational support airlift in the United States was centralized under the 375th Air Mobility Wing. It supported the Commander, United States Strategic Command, providing passenger airlift for Department of Defense officials throughout the US. In June 2005, the flight became the 311th Airlift Squadron and moved to Peterson Air Force Base, Colorado, absorbing the resources of the 84th Airlift Flight, which was inactivated. It was inactivated in June 2014, leaving the 200th Airlift Squadron of the Colorado Air National Guard to continue its mission at Peterson.

== Lineage ==
- Constituted as the 311th Troop Carrier Squadron on 23 October 1943

Activated on 1 November 1943
Inactivated on 15 May 1946

- Redesignated 311th Troop Carrier Squadron, Medium on 10 May 1949

Activated in the reserve on 27 June 1949
Ordered to active service on 1 April 1951
Inactivated on 2 April 1951

- Redesignated 311th Troop Carrier Squadron, Assault and activated on 24 May 1963 (not organized)

Organized on 8 July 1963
Redesignated 311th Air Commando Squadron, Troop Carrier on 8 March 1965
Redesignated 311th Air Commando Squadron, Tactical Airlift on 1 August 1967
Redesignated 311th Special Operations Squadron on 1 August 1968
Redesignated 311th Tactical Airlift Squadron on 1 January 1970
Inactivated on 5 October 1971

- Redesignated 311th Airlift Flight on 27 March 1997

Activated on 1 April 1997
Redesignated 311th Airlift Squadron on 15 June 2005
Inavtivated on 1 June 2014

=== Assignments ===
- 349th Troop Carrier Group, 1 November 1943
- I Troop Carrier Command, 1 December 1944
- VI Air Service Area Command, 9 February 1945
- Seventh Air Force, 22 July 1945
- U.S. Army Forces, Middle Pacific, 31 July 1945
- VIII Air Force Service Command, 1 September 1945
- 54th Troop Carrier Wing, 15 February–15 May 1946
- 349th Troop Carrier Group, 27 June 1949 – 2 April 1951
- 315th Troop Carrier Group (later 315 Air Commando Group), 8 July 1963
- 315th Air Commando Wing (later 315 Special Operations Wing, 315 Tactical Airlift Wing), 8 March 1966 – 5 October 1971
- 458th Airlift Squadron, 1 April 1997
- 375th Operations Group, 15 June 2005 – 1 June 2014

=== Stations ===
- Sedalia Army Air Field, Missouri, 1 November 1943
- Alliance Army Air Field, Nebraska, 19 January 1944
- Pope Field, North Carolina, 8 March 1944
- Baer Field, Indiana, 8 January 1945
- Fort Lawton, Washington, 24 January–1 February 1945
- Kahuku Army Air Base, Hawaii, 9 February 1945
- Bellows Field, Hawaii, 15 February–22 July 1945
- Okinawa, Ryuku Islands, 22 August 1945 – 15 May 1946
- Hamilton Air Force Base, California, 27 June 1949 – 2 April 1951
- Da Nang Air Base, South Vietnam, 8 July 1963
- Phan Rang Air Base, South Vietnam, 21 July 1967 – 5 October 1971
- Offutt Air Force Base, Nebraska, 1 April 1997
- Peterson Air Force Base, Colorado, 15 June 2005 – 1 June 2014

=== Aircraft ===
- Douglas C-47 Skytrain (1943–1945)
- Douglas C-53 Skytrooper (1943–1944)
- Curtiss C-46 Commando (1945–1946, 1949–1951)
- Fairchild C-123 Provider (1963–1971)
- Learjet C-21 (1997–2014)
