= 56th Air Refueling Squadron =

US Air Force unit

56th Air Refueling Squadron

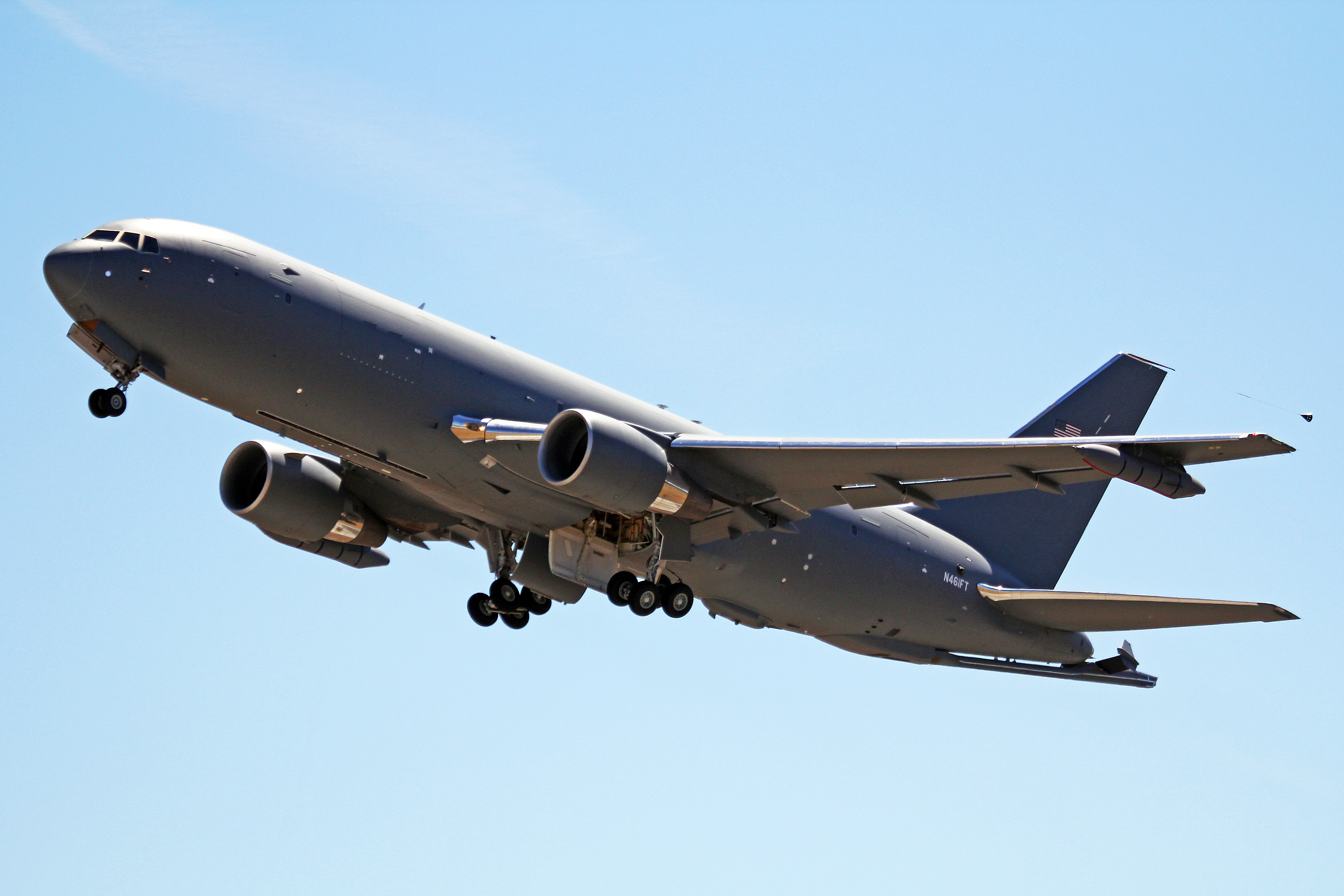
- KC-46 Pegasus as operated by the 56th Air Refueling Squadron
- Active: 1942–1946; 1947–1952; 1952–1957; 1966–2008; 2016–present
- Country: United States
- Branch: United States Air Force
- Role: Aerial refueling training
- Part of: Air Education and Training Command
- Nickname: Tokyo Trolley (1943–1946)
- Motto: Safety Through Knowledge (1966–2016) Novi Aut Peri (Latin for 'Learn or Perish') (2016–) (Note: When the squadron replaced the 1740th Air Transport Squadron in 1966, it adopted the 1740th's emblem, but replaced its motto, which had been Neminem Dimittere Nisi Paratus (Latin for 'Send None Forth Until They are Ready').)
- Decorations: Air Force Outstanding Unit Award; Philippine Presidential Unit Citation

Insignia
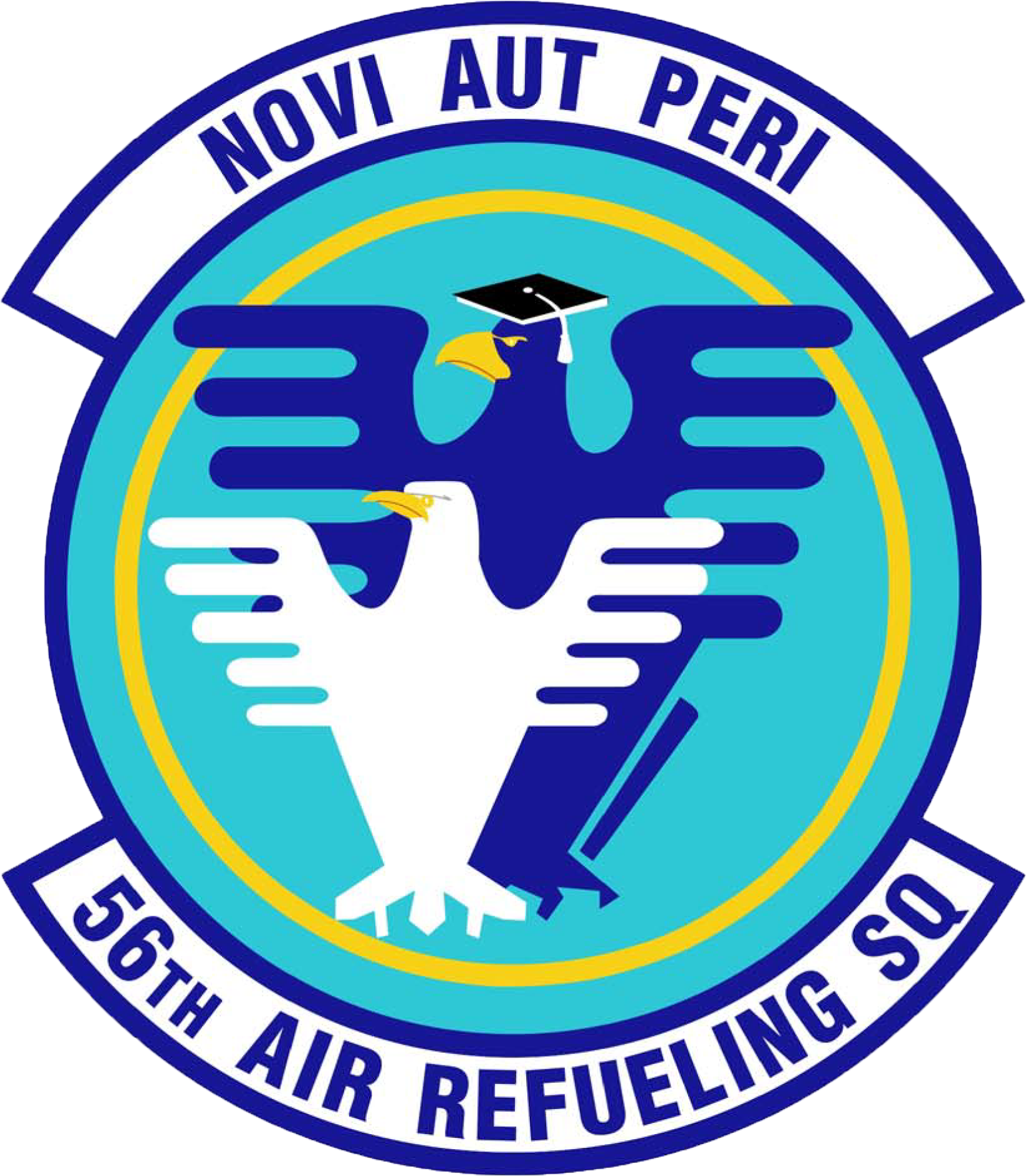
- 56th Air Refueling Squadron emblem

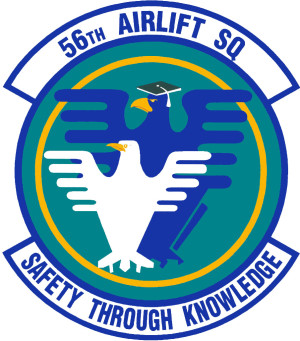
- 56th Airlift Squadron emblem (Note: Approved 16 November 1966.) (Note: The emblem was slightly modified on 12 July 1971. Haulman.)

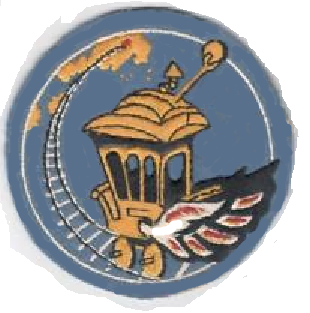
- Patch with 56th Troop Carrier Squadron emblem (World War II)

The 56th Air Refueling Squadron is an active unit of the United States Air Force. It is part of the 97th Operations Group at Altus Air Force Base, Oklahoma. It operates Boeing KC-46 Pegasus aircraft, conducting initial and advanced aircrew training for air refueling operations.

The squadron was first activated in 1942 as the 56th Troop Carrier Squadron. After training in the United States, the squadron moved to the Southwest Pacific Theater, where it conducted combat airlift operations against the Japanese until the surrender of Japan. It moved to Japan and served as part of the occupation forces until inactivating in 1946.

== History ==
=== World War II ===
The squadron was first activated 18 November 1942 as the 56th Troop Carrier Squadron at Bowman Field, Kentucky. After training in the United States, the squadron moved to New Guinea, where it conducted tactical airlift in the Southwest Pacific Theater. The unit participated in the airborne assault on Nadzab, New Guinea, on 5 September 1943 during World War II. After the surrender of Japan, the squadron moved to Tachikawa Airfield, where it participated in the military occupation of Japan until inactivating in 1946.

=== Reserve operations and Korean War ===
In August 1947, the squadron was activated at Greater Pittsburgh Airport as a reserve unit. It trained in the reserves until October 1950, when it was called to active duty for the Korean War. The squadron moved to Greenville Air Force Base, South Carolina and served on active duty until July 1952 when it was inactivated and its personnel and aircraft were transferred to the 18th Troop Carrier Squadron, which was simultaneously activated.

The same day it was inactivated at Greenville, the squadron returned to Pittsburgh and reserve service, where it assumed the mission, personnel and equipment of the 458th Troop Carrier Squadron, which was simultaneously inactivated. The squadron continued to train in the reserves until inactivating in 1957.

=== Airlift training ===
In 1966, Military Air Transport Service (MATS) became Military Airlift Command and replaced its former MAJCON (or 4 digit) units with Air Force Controlled units. As part of this transformation, the 56th replaced the 1740th Air Transport Squadron at Tinker Air Force Base, Oklahoma in January 1966. The 1740th had been organized by MATS on 5 September 1951 as the 1740th Air Transport Squadron (Transition Training Unit) at McChord Air Force Base, where it was assigned to the 1705th Air Transport Wing. It moved to Palm Beach Air Force Base in July 1952 and to Tinker Air Force Base in March 1959 when MATS moved its training wing. At Tinker, the squadron provided training for aircrews in Douglas C-124 Globemaster II.

Redesignated 56 Military Airlift Squadron, Training, in January 1966, the 56th Military Airlift Squadron replaced the 1740th and continued to train Globemaster crews through 1968. With the arrival of the Air Force's first Lockheed C-5 Galaxy\ on 17 December 1969, the 56th became the first operational C-5 squadron in the Air Force. It provided training and transition-flying training for aircrews in C-5 aircraft from 1969 to 2007. It also supported U.S. forces in Southeast Asia from April 1972 to December 1974.

The squadron was redesignated the 56th Airlift Squadron on 27 August 1991, and was assigned to the 97th Operations Group at Altus. It operated Lockheed C-5 Galaxy aircraft, conducting initial and advanced aircrew training for airlift, airdrop and air refueling operations. The 56th Airlift Squadron was the Air Force's formal school for Lockheed C-5 Galaxy airland qualification training. The squadron transferred its C-5s in 2007, although it did not inactivate until September 2008.

The last C-5 Galaxy flew away from Altus on 20 July 2007. It was transferred to 167th Airlift Wing, West Virginia Air National Guard.

=== Air refueling training ===
The Squadron was reactivated as the 56th Air Refueling Squadron on 1 August 2016 as the Air Force's Boeing KC-46A Pegasus formal training unit at Altus, after eight years of dormancy. The squadron received its first [Pegasus on 8 February 2019, followed by another two days later.

== Lineage ==
- Constituted as the 56th Troop Carrier Squadron on 12 November 1942

Activated on 18 November 1942
Inactivated on 25 March 1946
Activated in the reserves on 3 August 1947
Redesignated 56th Troop Carrier Squadron, Medium on 27 June 1949
Ordered to active service on 15 October 1950
Inactivated on 14 July 1952
Activated in the reserves on 14 July 1952
Inactivated on 16 November 1957
Redesignated 56th Military Airlift Squadron, Training and activated on 27 December 1965 (not organized)
Organized on 8 January 1966
Redesignated 56th Airlift Squadron on 27 August 1991
Inactivated on 30 September 2008
Redesignated 56th Air Refueling Squadron on 23 June 2016
Activated on 1 August 2016

=== Assignments ===
- 375th Troop Carrier Group, 12 November 1942 – 25 March 1946
- 375th Troop Carrier Group, 3 August 1947 – 14 July 1952
- 375th Troop Carrier Group, 14 July 1952 – 16 November 1957
- Military Air Transport Service (later Military Airlift Command), 27 December 1965 (not organized)
- 443d Military Airlift Wing (later 443d Airlift Wing), 8 January 1966
- 443d Operations Group, 1 October 1991
- 97th Operations Group, 1 October 1992 – 30 September 2008
- 97th Operations Group, 1 August 2016 – present

=== Stations ===
- Bowman Field, Kentucky, 18 November 1943
- Sedalia Army Air Field, Missouri, 23 January 1943
- Laurinburg-Maxton Army Air Base, North Carolina, 5 May 1943
- Baer Field, Indiana, 2 June 1943 – 17 June 1943
- Port Moresby Airfield Complex, New Guinea, c. 15 July 1943
- Dobodura Airfield Complex, New Guinea, 2 August 1943
- Port Moresby, New Guinea, 23 December 1943
- Nadzab Airfield Complex, New Guinea, 22 April 1944
- Biak, New Guinea, 19 September 1944
- San Jose, Occidental Mindoro, Occidental Mindoro, Philippines, 27 February 1945
- Porac, Pampanga, Philippines, c. 20 May 1945
- Okinawa, c. 20 August 1945
- Tachikawa Airfield, Japan, c. 20 September 1945 – 25 March 1946
- Greater Pittsburgh Airport, Pennsylvania, 3 August 1947
- Greenville Air Force Base, South Carolina, 16 October 1950 – 14 July 1952
- Greater Pittsburgh Airport, Pennsylvania, 14 July 1952 – 16 November 1957
- Tinker Air Force Base, Oklahoma, 8 January 1966
- Altus Air Force Base, Oklahoma 20 January 1969 – 30 September 2008
- Altus Air Force Base, Oklahoma, 1 August 2016 – present

=== Aircraft ===
- Douglas C-47 Skytrain (1942–1945)
- Boeing B-17 Flying Fortress (1944)
- Curtiss C-46 Commando (1944–1946, 1952–1954)
- Fairchild C-82 Packet (1949–1950)
- Fairchild C-119 Flying Boxcar (1954–1957)
- Douglas C-124 Globemaster II (1966–1968)
- Lockheed C-5 Galaxy (1969–2007)
- Boeing KC-46 Pegasus (2019–present)
