= 458th Airlift Squadron =

Unit of the United States Air Force

458th Airlift Squadron

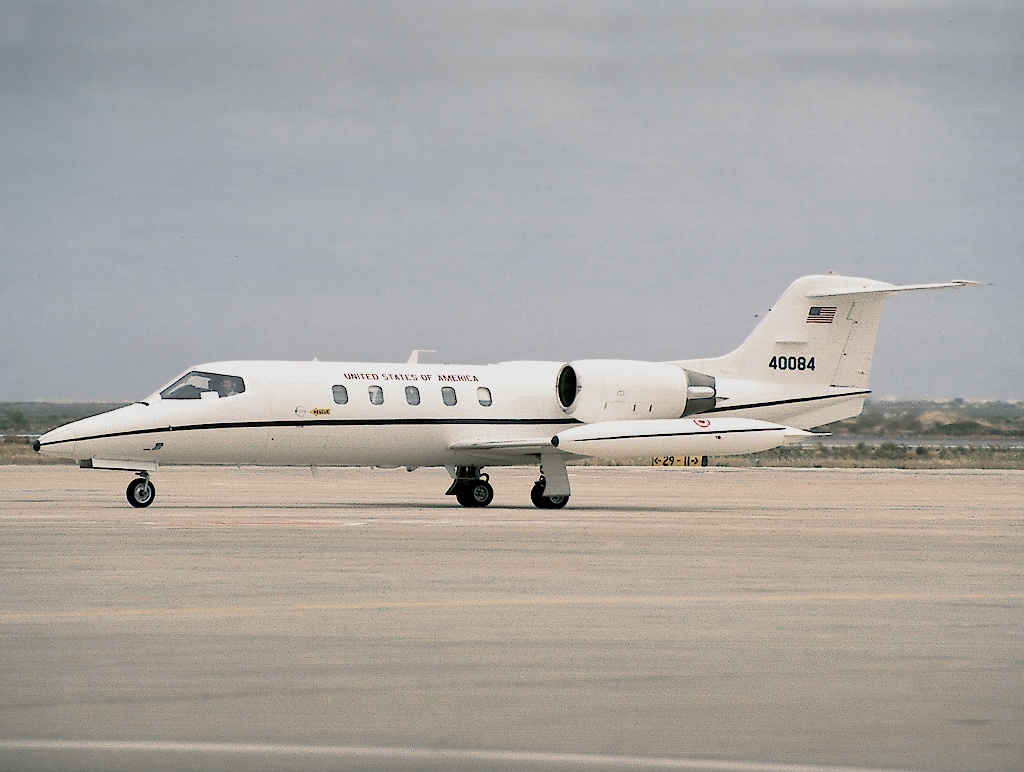
- Gates Learjet C-21A as flown by the squadron
- Active: 1942–1945; 1952; 1966–1972; 1975–present
- Country: United States
- Branch: United States Air Force
- Role: Airlift
- Part of: Air Mobility Command
- Garrison/HQ: Scott Air Force Base
- Engagements: Pacific Ocean Theater; Vietnam War
- Decorations: Distinguished Unit Citation; Presidential Unit Citation; Air Force Outstanding Unit Award with Combat "V" Device; Air Force Outstanding Unit Award; Republic of Vietnam Gallantry Cross with Palm

Insignia
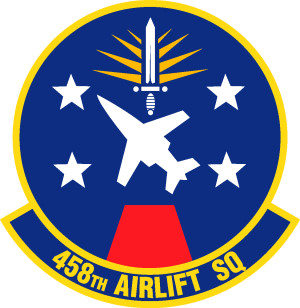
- 458th Airlift Squadron emblem (Note: Approved 18 May 1983. Description: "On a Blue disc edged with a narrow Yellow border, in chief a sword palewise with the point up White detailed Blue and issuing from the edges of the sword eight Yellow rays rising from the base a red trapezoid terminating below the silhouette of a white aircraft bendwise all between four White five-pointed stars two each in pale at dexter and sinister")

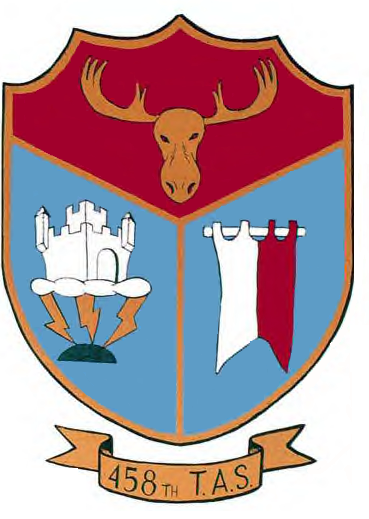
- 458 Tactical Airlift Squadron emblem (Note: Approved 27 March 1968.)

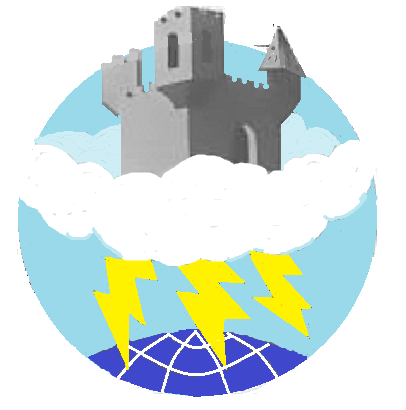
- 458th Bombardment Squadron (Note: Approved 27 June 1945. Description: "Over and through a light blue disc, a gray fortress in a large white cloud formation, having three, jagged, yellow lightning flashes striking toward base, over the top segment of an ultramarine blue globe, marked with white lines of longitude and latitude")

The 458th Airlift Squadron is part of the 375th Airlift Wing at Scott Air Force Base, Illinois. It operates C-21 aircraft, providing executive airlift and aeromedical evacuation. It has performed its current mission since activating in 1975 as the 1401st Military Airlift Squadron. The 1401st Squadron was consolidated with the 458th in 1991.

The squadron was first activated during World War II as the 458th Bombardment Squadron. It was a replacement training unit for heavy bomber crews until being inactivated in the spring of 1944 when the Army Air Forces reorganized its training and support units in the United States. It was reactivated the same day as a Boeing B-29 Superfortress unit. The unit deployed to the Pacific Ocean Theater in early 1945 and participated in the strategic bombing campaign against Japan until V-J Day, earning two Distinguished Unit Citations for its actions. The squadron returned to the United States in December 1945 and was inactivated.

The squadron was redesignated the 458th Troop Carrier Squadron and activated in the reserve in 1952, but was quickly inactivated as reserve units that had been mobilized for the Korean War were released from active duty. As the Air Force assumed the light airlift mission from the Army, the squadron was again activated on New Year's Day 1967. It served in combat in Vietnam until March 1972, earning an additional Presidential Unit Citation and three Air Force Outstanding Unit Awards with Combat "V" Device before inactivating in theater.

== Mission ==
The squadron's mission is to provide air mobility operations through its fleet of 14 C-21 Learjet operational support aircraft. It delivers rapid, responsive and safe airlift, including aeromedical evacuation in increasingly congested airspace. It also acts as the Formal Training Unit for the C-21.

== History ==
=== World War II ===
==== Bombardment training unit ====
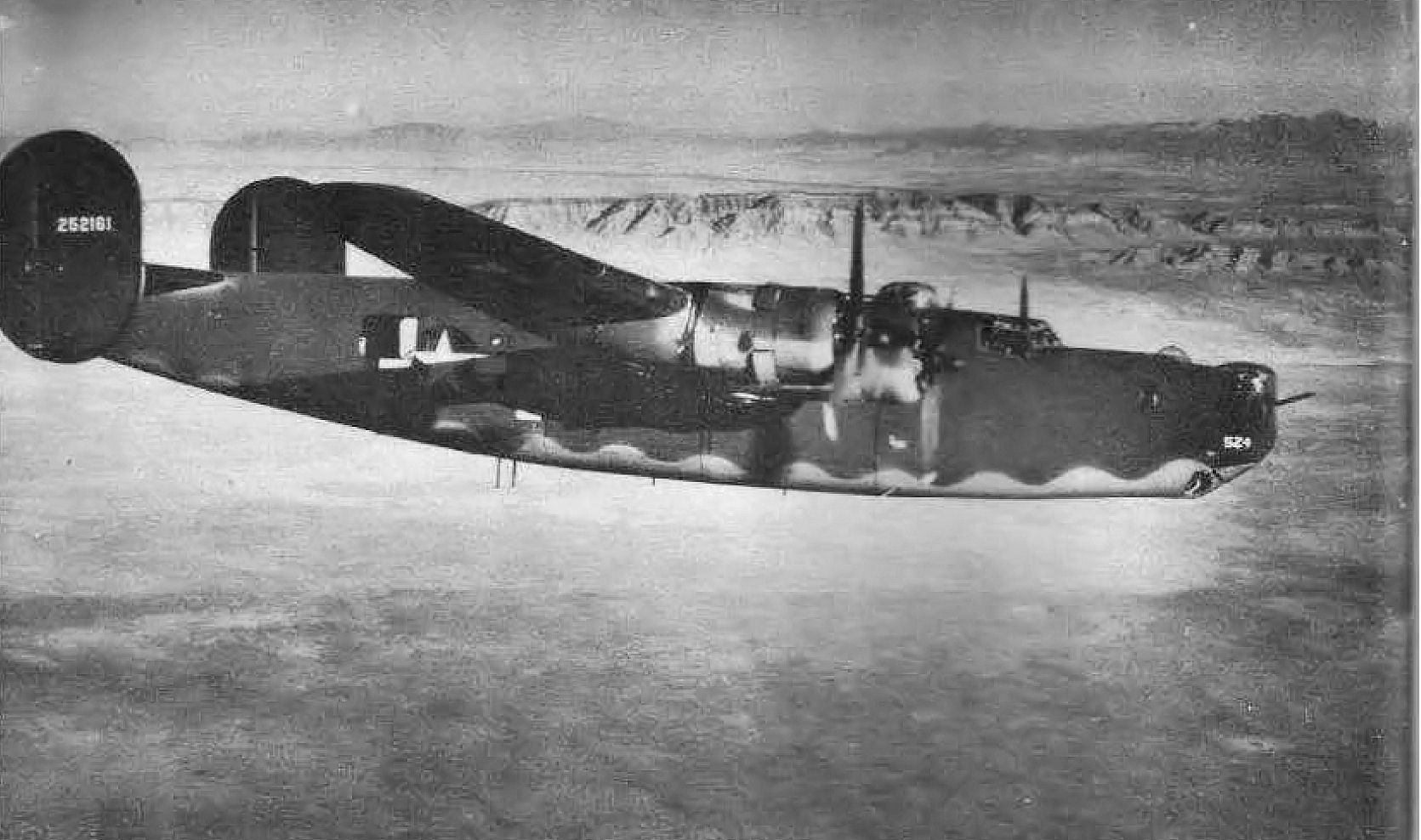
B-24 Liberator 42-52161 from Alamogordo Army Airfield (Note: Aircraft is Ford Motors built Consolidated B-24H-10-FO Liberator, serial 42-52161. It later deployed to Europe and was shot down on 22 February 1944. Missing Aircrew Report 2832.)

The squadron was first activated at Salt Lake City Army Air Base, Utah on 6 July 1942 as one of the original four squadrons of the 330th Bombardment Group. Although equipped early on with some Boeing B-17 Flying Fortresses, it became a Consolidated B-24 Liberator Operational Training Unit (OTU), moving to Biggs Field, Texas by early September. The OTU program was patterned after the unit training system of the Royal Air Force and involved the use of an oversized parent unit to provide cadres to "satellite groups" It then assumed responsibility for their training and oversaw their expansion with graduates of Army Air Forces Training Command schools to become effective combat units. Phase I training concentrated on individual training in crewmember specialties. Phase II training emphasized the coordination for the crew to act as a team. The final phase concentrated on operation as a unit.

By early 1944 most units had been activated and almost three quarters of them had deployed overseas. With the exception of special programs, like forming Boeing B-29 Superfortress units, training “fillers” for existing units became more important than unit training. The squadron then became a Replacement Training Unit (RTU). RTUs were also oversized unit, but their mission was to train individual pilots or aircrews.

However, the Army Air Forces was finding that standard military units like the 458th, whose manning was based on relatively inflexible tables of organization were proving not well adapted to the training mission, even more so to the replacement mission. Accordingly, the Army Air Forces adopted a more functional system in which each base was organized into a separate numbered unit. As a result, the 330th Bombardment Group and its components, including the 458th, along with all supporting units at Biggs were inactivated or disbanded on 1 April 1944 and replaced by the 235th AAF Base Unit (Combat Crew Training School, Bombardment, Very Heavy).

==== B-29 Superfortress operations against Japan ====
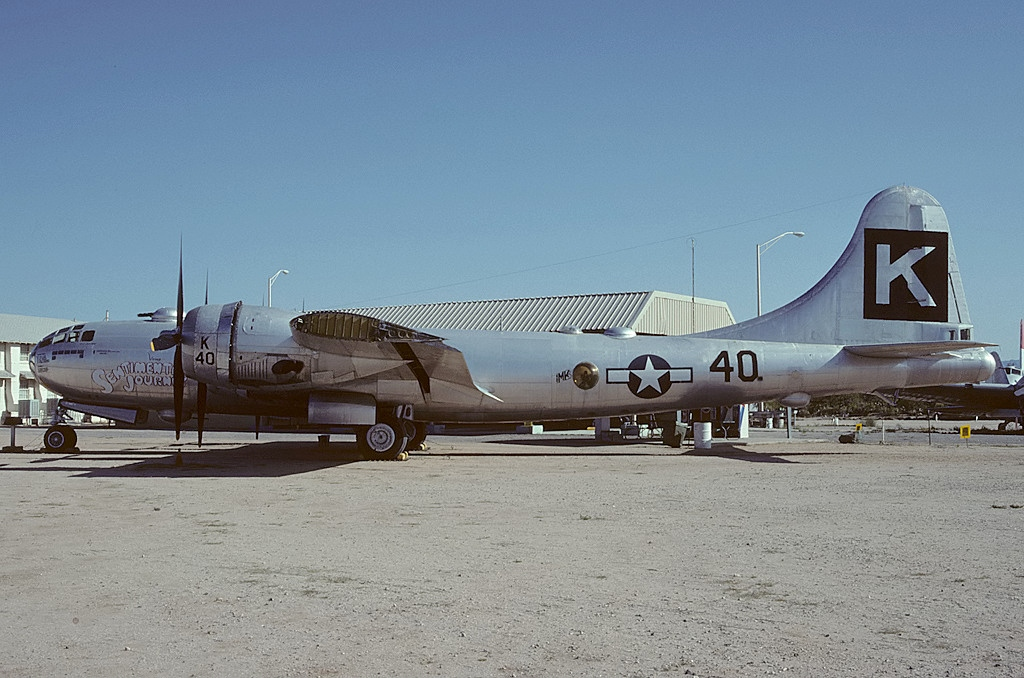
Squadron B-29 Superfortress (Note: Aircraft is Boeing B-29-75-BW Superfortress, serial 44-70016, Sentimental Journey, Quaker City. After the war this aircraft served as a TB-29 radar evaluation plane, Dopey. Transferred to storage in June 1959, this plane is now on display at the Pima Air Museum on loan from the National Museum of the United States Air Force. Baugher, Joe (9 October 2023). "1944 USAF Serial Numbers". Joe Baugher.)

The squadron was activated the same day at Walker Army Air Field, Kansas as a Boeing B-29 unit. While waiting for new B-29s to come off the production line, it again flew B-17 Flying Fortresses for a short time. It trained at Walker and at Dalhart Army Air Field, Texas until January 1945, when it deployed to the Pacific.

The squadron arrived at its combat station, North Field, Guam in the Mariana Islands in early February 1945. Because the results of high altitude B-29 raids on Japan were disappointing. XXI Bomber Command switched to low altitude night area attacks with incendiaries beginning in March 1945. It flew its first combat mission, an attack on the Hodogaya chemical plant in Koriyama, Japan on 12 April 1945.

During April and May 1945, the squadron was diverted from the strategic campaign against Japan to support Operation Iceberg, the invasion of Okinawa. It struck air bases from which kamikaze attacks were being launched. Many of these bases were located on Kyushu, only 300 miles from Okinawa. The attacks directly impacted kamikaze launches, but also forced the Japanese military to retain fighter aircraft to defend the Japanese Special Attack Units that otherwise might have been used to challenge air superiority over Okinawa. (Note: 75% of Twentieth Air Force's missions in April and May 1945 were flown to support Operation Iceberg. Cate & Olson p. 631.)

The squadron resumed attacking urban industrial areas until the end of the war in August 1945. It was awarded a Distinguished Unit Citation (DUC) for incendiary raids on the industrial sections of Tokushima and Gifu and a strike against the hydroelectrical power center at Kofu in July 1945. It received a second DUC for a mission attacking the Nakajima aircraft engine plant at Musashino near Tokyo in August.

Following V-J Day the squadron dropped food and supplies to Allied prisoners of war and participated in several show of force missions over Japan. It departed the theater in November and was inactivated at Camp Anza, the Port of Embarkation in December 1945.

=== Air Force reserve ===
The reserve mobilization for the Korean War had left the reserve without aircraft. In September 1951, Continental Air Command (ConAC) formed the 917th Reserve Training Wing to train reservists at Greater Pittsburgh Airport, Pennsylvania. Anticipating the return of mission aircraft to reserve units, ConAC replaced the 917th Wing with the 330th Troop Carrier Wing on 14 June 1952. The squadron was redesignated the 458th Troop Carrier Squadron and activated the same day. It is not clear whether the squadron possessed its own aircraft or flew the Curtiss C-46 Commandos of the 2253rd Air Force Reserve Training Center, which was responsible for its training. However, this activation was short lived, as the 330th was replaced by the 375th Troop Carrier Wing, which was released from active duty on 14 July 1952, and which had been mobilized at Greater Pittsburgh in 1951. The 458th was inactivated and transferred its personnel to the 56th Troop Carrier Squadron, which was simultaneously activated.

=== Vietnam War ===
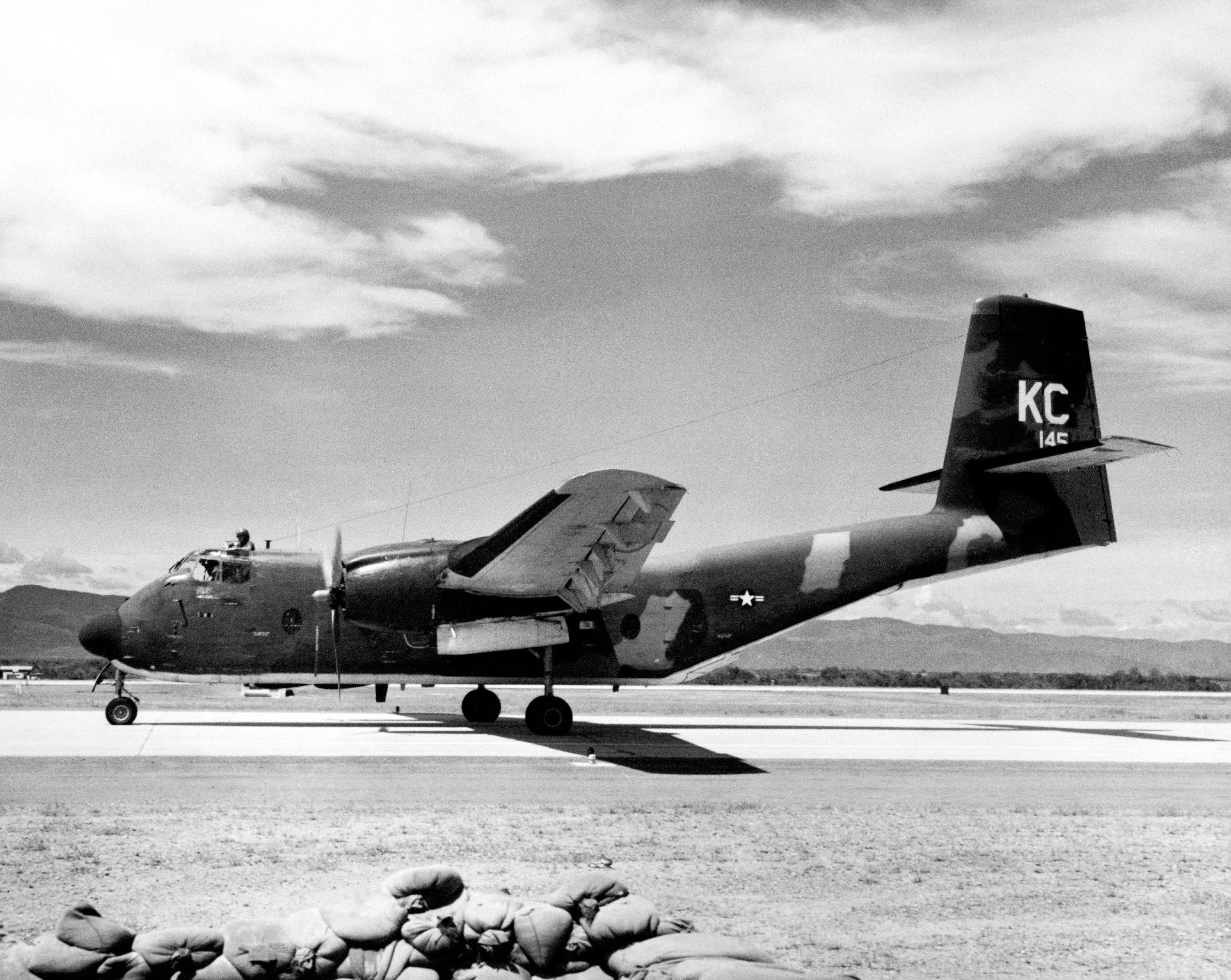
A 458th TAS C-7B in Vietnam, 13 September 1970.

In August 1966, the Air Force and the Army began implementing Project Red Leaf, which would transfer responsibility for the de Havilland Canada C-7 Caribou from the Army to the Air Force following the Johnson-McConnell agreement of 1966. AAt Dong Ba Thin Airfield, South Vietnam, Air Force personnel began being assigned to the 135th Aviation Company. The Department of Defense had ordered that the 483d Tactical Airlift Wing's new squadrons be located on Air Force installations, not on Army posts, and the cadre of the wing at Cam Ranh Bay Air Base began planning to move squadron level operations from the small Army camps they were operating from to permanent sites when the Air Force units were activated. In December, the company began moving to Cam Ranh Bay Air Base, and on 1 January 1967, the 458th Squadron was organized and took over Caribou operations from the 135th Company.

The squadron provided intratheater airlift to support United States military civic actions, combat support and civic assistance throughout the Republic of Vietnam. This included airland and airdrop assault missions. It also maintained a detachment at Nha Trang Air Base. In the summer of 1967, the 458th and its sister Caribou squadron at Cam Ranh Bay, the 457th Tactical Airlift Squadron took over Caribou operations at Pleiku Air Base, formerly operated by the 459th Tactical Airlift Squadron. However, a Viet Cong mortar attack on Can Tho Airfield on 21 December 1967 that damaged two C-7s, forced a reevaluation of dispersal arrangements and Caribous were withdrawn from Nha Trang.

Most missions by the Caribou were airlift flights, with fewer than 2% being airdrops. The squadron experienced an exception to this during the attempt by the North Vietnamese Army to overrun Duc Lap Camp, near the Cambodian border. The camp was manned by half strength Civilian Irregular Defense Group companies, assisted by American special forces. Duc Lap's landing strip was outside its defensive perimeter, and once Communist forces had surrounded the camp and occupied parts of it, airlanding resupplies was out of the question. Airdrops were particularly difficult, as only about 75 square yards remained in friendly force possession. The squadron's pilots approached the camp from random directions, flying at treetop level using strong evasive action due to heavy enemy fire, popping up and leveling off at the minimum altitude for parachutes to open only seconds before the drop was made. Squadron efforts included what is believed to have been the first operational night airdrop by a Caribou, flown by Major George Finck, which encountered heavy fire approaching a drop zone marked only by flares. Major Finck was awarded the Air Force Cross for this mission. Major Hunter Hackney also received an Air Force Cross for missions flown on 25 August. On that afternoon, he flew an air drop mission on which he received "hundreds" of hits by enemy antiaircraft fire. Despite his plane being rendered unflyable, he flew another sortie with a different plane, incurring yet more battle sameagem, but completing the mission. Between 24 and 26 August, C-7s delivered 26 tons of supplies to the besieged camp. After the 26th, reinforcements expanded the area under friendly control and the brunt of further supply was borne by Army Boeing CH-47 Chinook heavy lift helicopters. For his heroism in making airdrops, Major Hunter Hackney was awarded the Air Force Cross.

In April 1970, the squadron helped break the siege of Dak Seang Special Forces Camp. North Vietnamese forces had surrounded the camp, and learning from the success of air resupply during their 1969 attack on the Ben Het Camp, also established anti-aircraft artillery positions along likely air resupply corridors. On the first day of the siege, two C-7s were diverted from their scheduled missions and staged out of Pleiku to make the first airdrops to the camp. Resupply of the camp was so urgent that all drop-qualified crews of the 483rd Tactical Airlift Wing were ordered to Pleiku to support the operation and eleven sorties were flown that day with cover from Douglas A-1 Skyraiders. Crews approached the camp from the north or south to use terrain to mask their approaches from enemy flak. Loss of the third Caribou in five days, including one from the 458th, prompted a move to resupply the camp with night drops, with cover and illumination provided by Fairchild AC-119 Stinger gunships. All 483rd Wing squadrons participated in the operation. It earned a second Presidential Unit Citation for this action, evacuation of over 2000 refugees from Cambodia, and transportation of the Presidential Southeast Asia Investigation Team to various remote locations in South Vietnam. The squadron flew its last combat mission the day it was inactivated.

The squadron transferred most of its equipment to the Republic of Viet Nam Air Force and was inactivated in March 1972 as Cam Ranh Bay prepared for closure with the withdrawal of the United States military from Viet Nam.

=== Administrative airlift ===
The second predecessor of the squadron was activated at Scott Air Force Base, Illinois on 1 April 1975 as the 1401st Military Airlift Squadron and assigned to the 89th Military Airlift Wing. The 1401st was one of the squadrons formed when the Air Force decided to consolidate its administrative airlift fleet under Military Airlift Command. The Air Force also decided the administrative airlift fleet would become all jet, using North American T-39 Sabreliners, although the 458th also flew turboprop powered Beechcraft C-12 Hurons. In 1978, the squadron transferred to the 375th Aeromedical Airlift Wing, and until 1990 also flew aeromedical evacuation missions. In 1984, it converted from the Sabreliner to the Learjet C-21. From August 1990 to May 1991, it conducted airlift in Southwest Asia. In December 1991, the two squadrons were consolidated as the 458th Airlift Squadron.

From 1997 until 2005, the squadron was assigned airlift flights at Offutt Air Force Base, Nebraska; Peterson Air Force Base, Colorado; and Randolph Air Force Base, Texas. These flights had been formed in 1993, or replaced flights formed in 1993, when the Air Force decentralized administrative airlift, but were assigned to the squadron when control of administrative airlift was returned to Air Mobility Command.

In 2011, the squadron assumed responsibility for training C-21 pilots and instructors for the Air Force. This mission had been performed at Keesler Air Force Base, Mississippi since 1990.

== Lineage ==
458th Airlift Squadron

- Constituted as the 458th Bombardment Squadron (Heavy) on 1 July 1942

Activated on 6 July 1942
Inactivated on 1 April 1944

- Redesignated 458th Bombardment Squadron, Very Heavy and activated on 1 April 1944

Inactivated on 27 December 1945

- Redesignated 458th Troop Carrier Squadron, Medium on 26 May 1952

Activated in the reserve on 14 June 1952
Inactivated on 14 July 1952

- Redesignated 458th Troop Carrier Squadron and activated on 12 October 1966 (not organized)

Organized on 1 January 1967
Redesignated 458th Tactical Airlift Squadron on 1 August 1967
Inactivated on 1 March 1972

- Consolidated with the 1401st Military Airlift Squadron as the 458th Airlift Squadron on 1 December 1991

1401st Military Airlift Squadron

- Designated as the 1401st Military Airlift Squadron and activated on 1 April 1975.
- Consolidated with the 458th Tactical Airlift Squadron as the 458th Airlift Squadron on 1 December 1991

=== Assignments ===
- 330th Bombardment Group, 6 July 1952 – 1 April 1944
- 330th Bombardment Group, 1 April 1944 – 27 December 1945
- 330th Troop Carrier Group, 14 June–14 July 1952
- Pacific Air Forces, 12 October 1966 (not organized)
- 483d Troop Carrier Wing (later 483d Tactical Airlift Wing), 1 January 1967 – 1 March 1972
- 89th Military Airlift Wing (later 89th Military Airlift Group), 1 April 1975
- 375th Aeromedical Airlift Wing (later 375th Military Airlift Wing), 15 March 1978
- 375th Operations Group, 1 December 1991 – present

=== Components ===
- 84th Airlift Flight, 1 April 1997 – 15 June 2005 (Peterson Air Force Base)
- 311th Airlift Flight, 1 April 1997 – 15 June 2005 (Offutt Air Force Base)
- 332d Airlift Flight, 1 April 1997 – 15 September 2004 (Randolph Air Force Base)

=== Stations ===
- Salt Lake City Army Air Base, Utah, 6 July 1942
- Alamogordo Army Air Field, New Mexico, 1 August 1942
- Biggs Field, Texas, 2 September 1942
- Alamogordo Army Air Field, New Mexico, 29 November 1942
- Biggs Field, Texas, 5 April 1943 – 1 April 1944
- Walker Army Air Field, Kansas, 1 April 1944
- Dalhart Army Air Field, Texas, 25 May 1944
- Walker Army Air Field, Kansas, 1 August 1944 – 7 January 1945
- North Field, Guam, Mariana Islands, 18 February–19 November 1945
- Camp Anza, California, c. 18–27 December 1945
- Greater Pittsburgh Airport, Pennsylvania, 14 Jun-14 July 1952
- Cam Ranh Bay Air Base, South Vietnam, 1 January 1966 – 30 April 1972
- Scott Air Force Base, Illinois, 1 April 1975 – present

=== Aircraft ===
- Boeing B-17 Flying Fortress (1942, 1944)
- Consolidated B-24 Liberator (1942–1944)
- Boeing B-29 Superfortress (1944–1945)
- de Havilland Canada C-7 Caribou (1967–1972)
- North American T-39 Sabreliner (1975–1984)
- Beechcraft C-12 Huron (1976–1977, 1984 – unknown)
- Learjet C-21 (1984 – present)

=== Awards and campaigns ===
Award streamer	Award	Dates	Notes
	Distinguished Unit Citation	3–9 July 1945	Japan, 458th Bombardment Squadron
	Distinguished Unit Citation	8 August 1945	Tokyo, 458th Bombardment Squadron
	Presidential Unit Citation	21 January – 12 May 1968	Southeast Asia, 458th Tactical Airlift Squadron
	Presidential Unit Citation	1 April – 30 June 1970	Southeast Asia, 458th Tactical Airlift Squadron
	Air Force Outstanding Unit Award with Combat "V" Device	1 January – 30 April 1967	458th Troop Carrier Squadron
	Air Force Outstanding Unit Award with Combat "V" Device	1 May 1967 – 30 April 1968	458th Troop Carrier Squadron (later 458th Tactical Airlift Squadron)
	Air Force Outstanding Unit Award with Combat "V" Device	1 July 1970 – 31 December 1971	458th Tactical Airlift Squadron
	Air Force Outstanding Unit Award	1 July – 31 December 1975	1401st Military Airlift Squadron
	Air Force Outstanding Unit Award	1 January 1976 – 31 January 1977	1401st Military Airlift Squadron
	Air Force Outstanding Unit Award	1 July 1981 – 30 une 1983	1401st Military Airlift Squadron
	Air Force Outstanding Unit Award	1 July 1986 – 31 July 1988	1401st Military Airlift Squadron
	Air Force Outstanding Unit Award	1 June 1994 – 30 June 1996	458th Airlift Squadron
	Air Force Outstanding Unit Award	1 June 1998 – 31 May 2000	458th Airlift Squadron
	Air Force Outstanding Unit Award	1 June 2003 – 31 May 2005	458th Airlift Squadron
	Air Force Outstanding Unit Award	1 June 2006 – 31 May 2008	458th Airlift Squadron
	Air Force Outstanding Unit Award	1 Oct 2019 – 31 August 2021	458th Airlift Squadron
	Vietnamese Gallantry Cross with Palm	1 January 1967 – 30 April 1972 (Note: Per AFHRA Factsheet. The AF Personnel Center lists two awards of the Gallantry Cross.)	458th Troop Carrier Squadron (later 458th Tactical Airlift Squadron)

Campaign Streamer	Campaign	Dates	Notes
	American Theater without inscription	6 July 1942–1 April 1944, 1 April 1944–7 January 1945	458th Bombardment Squadron
	Air Offensive, Japan	18 February 1945–2 September 1945	458th Bombardment Squadron
	Western Pacific	17 April 1945–2 September 1945	458th Bombardment Squadron
	Vietnam Air Offensive	1 January 1966–8 March 1967	458th Troop Carrier Squadron
	Vietnam Air Offensive, Phase II	9 March 1967–31 March 1968	458th Troop Carrier Squadron (later 458th Tactical Airlift Squadron)
	Vietnam Air/Ground 1968	22 January 1968–7 July 1968	458th Tactical Airlift Squadron
	Vietnam Air Offensive, Phase III	1 April 1968–31 October 1968	458th Tactical Airlift Squadron
	Vietnam Air Offensive, Phase IV	1 November 1968–22 February 1969	458th Tactical Airlift Squadron
	Tet 1969/Counteroffensive	23 February 1969–8 June 1969	458th Tactical Airlift Squadron
	Vietnam Summer-Fall 1969	9 June 1969–31 October 1969	458th Tactical Airlift Squadron
	Vietnam Winter-Spring 1970	3 November 1969–30 April 1970	458th Tactical Airlift Squadron
	Sanctuary Counteroffensive	1 May 1970–30 June 1970	458th Tactical Airlift Squadron
	Southwest Monsoon	1 July 1970–30 November 1970	458th Tactical Airlift Squadron
	Commando Hunt V	1 December 1970–14 May 1971	458th Tactical Airlift Squadron
	Commando Hunt VI	15 May 1971–31 July 1971	458th Tactical Airlift Squadron
	Commando Hunt VII	1 November 1971–29 March 1972	458th Tactical Airlift Squadron

== See also ==
- List of United States Air Force airlift squadrons
- List of B-29 Superfortress operators
- B-24 Liberator units of the United States Army Air Forces
