= 1707th Air Transport Wing =

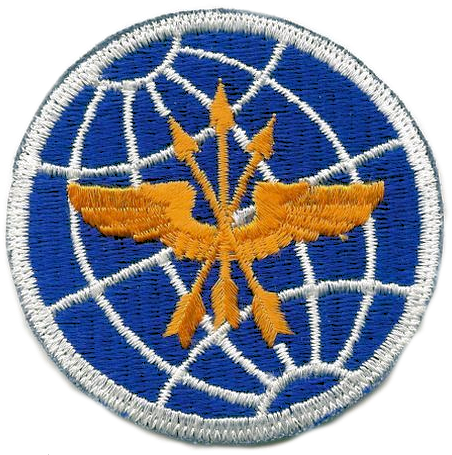
1707th Air Transport Wing
- Active: 1951–1966
- Country: United States
- Branch: United States Air Force
- Role: Airlift Training
- Motto: Safety Through Knowledge
- Decorations: Air Force Outstanding Unit Award

Insignia
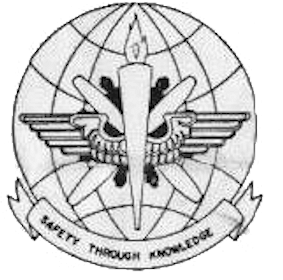
- 1707th Air Transport Wing emblem

The 1707th Air Transport Wing is a discontinued United States Air Force unit. It was last assigned to Military Air Transport Service (MATS) at Tinker Air Force Base, Oklahoma. It was discontinued on 8 January 1966, when MATS replaced its Major Command controlled (MAJCON) wings with Air Force controlled (AFCON) wings when MATS was redesignated as Military Airlift Command. The mission, personnel and equipment of the wing were transferred to the 443d Military Airlift Wing, which was simultaneously activated.

== History ==
The wing was organized as the 1707th Air Base Wing in 1951 at Palm Beach Air Force Base, Florida when Military Air Transport Service (MATS) reopened the base. Palm Beach was a joint civil-military facility with Palm Beach International Airport. The wing's 1707th Air Transport Group was its operational unit until the wing was redesignated the 1707th Air Transport Wing. The wing's first main activity was the rehabilitation of buildings to resume military operations.

In addition to operating the active Air Force portion of Palm Beach, the mission of 1707th was training USAF personnel on operation and maintenance of MATS heavy-lift transports. Known as the "University of MATS", training included Douglas C-124 Globemaster II, Douglas C-118 Liftmaster, Boeing C-97 Stratofreighter, and Douglas C-54 Skymaster maintenance training along with aircrew and transition pilot training. The wing later added Boeing C-135 training to its curriculum. Nearly 23,000 airmen were trained at Palm Beach Air Force Base. Until 1959 the wing also trained Grumman SA-16 Albatross crews for MATS' Air Rescue Service, and until 1962, Boeing WB-50D Superfortress crews for MATS' Air Weather Service. The United States Navy also maintained a Transport Training Unit that was attached to the wing until 1963.

The wing moved to Tinker Air Force Base, Oklahoma in June 1959 due to urban encroachment and local opposition to military presence at the airport. It received the first Lockheed C-141 Starlifter aircraft in 1964 and expanded its training mission to include Starlifter operation and maintenance. In addition to the training mission, the 1707th maintained a state of readiness to airlift armed forces personnel and equipment, including medical evacuation in the event of national emergencies.

In 1961 the wing earned trophies from MATS for having the best ground and flying safety programs in MATS. Its safety record also earned it an Air Force Outstanding Unit Award that year. The wing was discontinued on 8 January 1966, and its equipment and personnel were reassigned to the 443d Military Airlift Wing, which was activated the same date.

== Lineage ==
- Designated as the 1707th Air Base Wing and organized on 1 September 1951

Redesignated 1707th Air Transport Wing (Training) on 1 May 1954
Redesignated 1707th Air Transport Wing, Heavy (Training) on 20 September 1954
Discontinued on 8 January 1966

=== Assignments ===
- Continental Division, Military Air Transport Service (later Western Transport Air Force), 1 September 1951
- Military Air Transport Service, c. 1959 – 8 January 1966

=== Components ===
==== Groups ====
- 1707th Air Base Group, 21 September 1951 – c. 30 June 1959
- 1707th Air Transport Group, 21 September 1951 – 1 September 1953
- 1707th Maintenance & Supply Group, 24 October 1951 – 1 September 1953
- 1707th Medical Group (later 1707th USAF Hospital), 21 September 1951 – c. 30 June 1959

==== Squadrons ====
- 1707th Maintenance Squadron (later 1707th Field Maintenance Squadron), 1 September 1953 – 1 June 1959
- 1707th Student Squadron (later 1707th Technical Training Squadron), 1 September 1954 – c. 30 June 1957
- 1707th Supply Squadron, 1 September 1953 – 1 June 1959
- 1709th Training Squadron (later 1709th Technical Training Squadron), 1 September 1954 – 30 June 1959
- 1707th Support Squadron, 21 January 1963 – 1 April 1964
- 1740th Air Transport Squadron (Transition Training Unit), 1 September 1953 – 8 January 1966
- 1741st Air Transport Squadron (Transition Training Unit), 1 September 1953 – 8 January 1966
- 1742d Air Transport Squadron (Transition Training Unit), 1 March 1956 – 1 January 1960
- 2156th Air Rescue Squadron (Transition Training Unit) (later 1707th Training Squadron (Amphibious), 1707th Flying Training Squadron (Amphibious)), 20 July 1952 – c. 31 March 1959
- 565th Air Force Band, 1954 – 8 February 1958 (not manned after 28 January 1958)

=== Stations ===
- Palm Beach Air Force Base, Florida, 16 September 1951
- Tinker Air Force Base, Oklahoma, 1 June 1959 – 8 January 1966

=== Aircraft ===
- Boeing WB-50 Superfortress
- Douglas C-54 Skymaster
- Boeing C-97 Stratofreighter
- Douglas C-118 Liftmaster

- Douglas C-124 Globemaster II
- Boeing C-135
- Lockheed C-141 Starlifter, 1964–1966
- Grumman SA-16 Albatross, 1952–1959

=== Awards ===
Award streamer	Award	Dates	Notes
	Air Force Outstanding Unit Award	1 January 1961-31 December 1961	1707th Air Transport Wing

== See also ==
List of MAJCOM wings of the United States Air Force
