= Ledo Airfield =

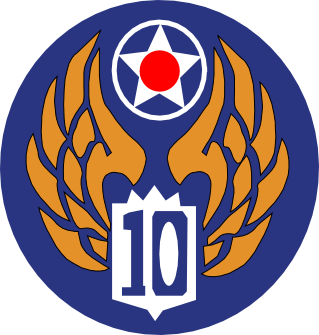
Ledo Airfield
- Part of Tenth Air Force
- Ledo, India

Site information
- Type: Military airfield
- Controlled by: United States Army Air Forces

Location
- Coordinates: 27°18′09″N 095°44′14″E (Approximate)

Site history
- Built: 1944
- In use: 1944–1945
- Battles/wars: Burma Campaign 1944–1945

Ledo Airfield is a former wartime United States Army Air Forces airfield in India used during the Burma Campaign 1944–1945. It is now abandoned, having been destroyed by the 1950 Assam–Tibet earthquake.

== History ==
The airfield was located at the Railhead for the Ledo Road and was also used as one of the main supply points for "the Hump" transport route to Allied forces in China. It was the home of the C-46 Commandos of the 443rd Troop Carrier Group and the Air Transport Command India-China Wing 1st Air Cargo Resupply Squadron. The airfield was used by transport units until the end of January 1946 when it closed.
