= 443d Airlift Wing =

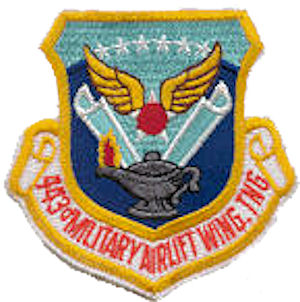
- 443d Military Airlift Wing, Training Patch
- Active: 1949–1953; 1965–1992
- Country: United States
- Branch: United States Air Force
- Role: Heavy airlift training

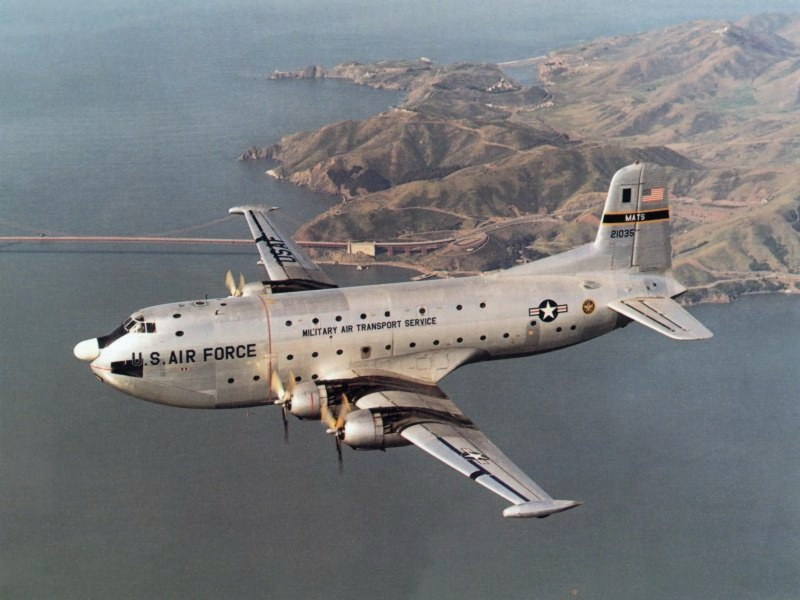
USAF C-124 Globemaster II

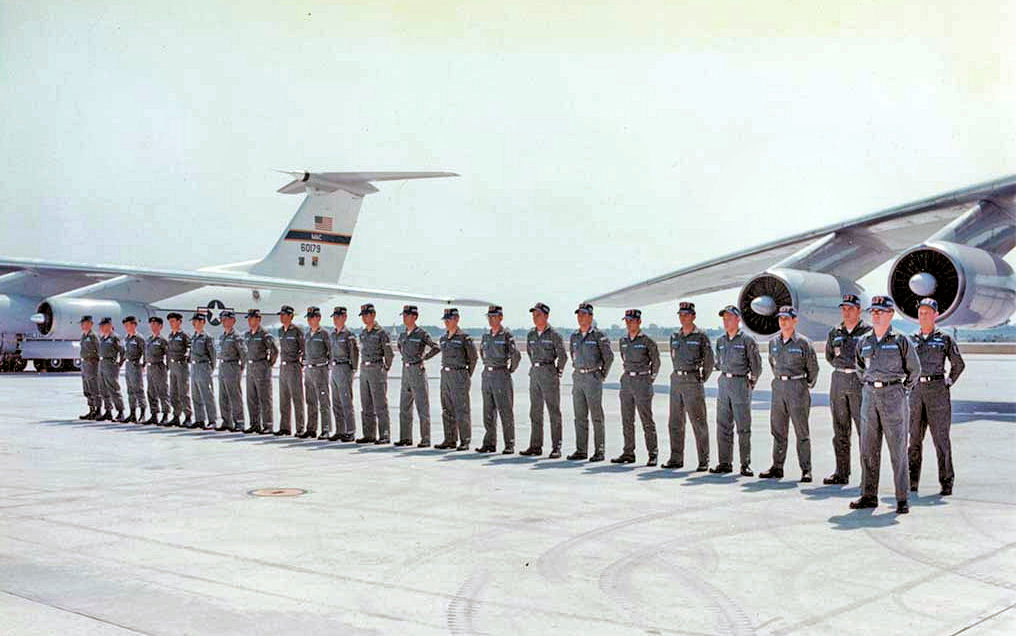
C-141A Graduating Class, 1970s (66-0179 in background)

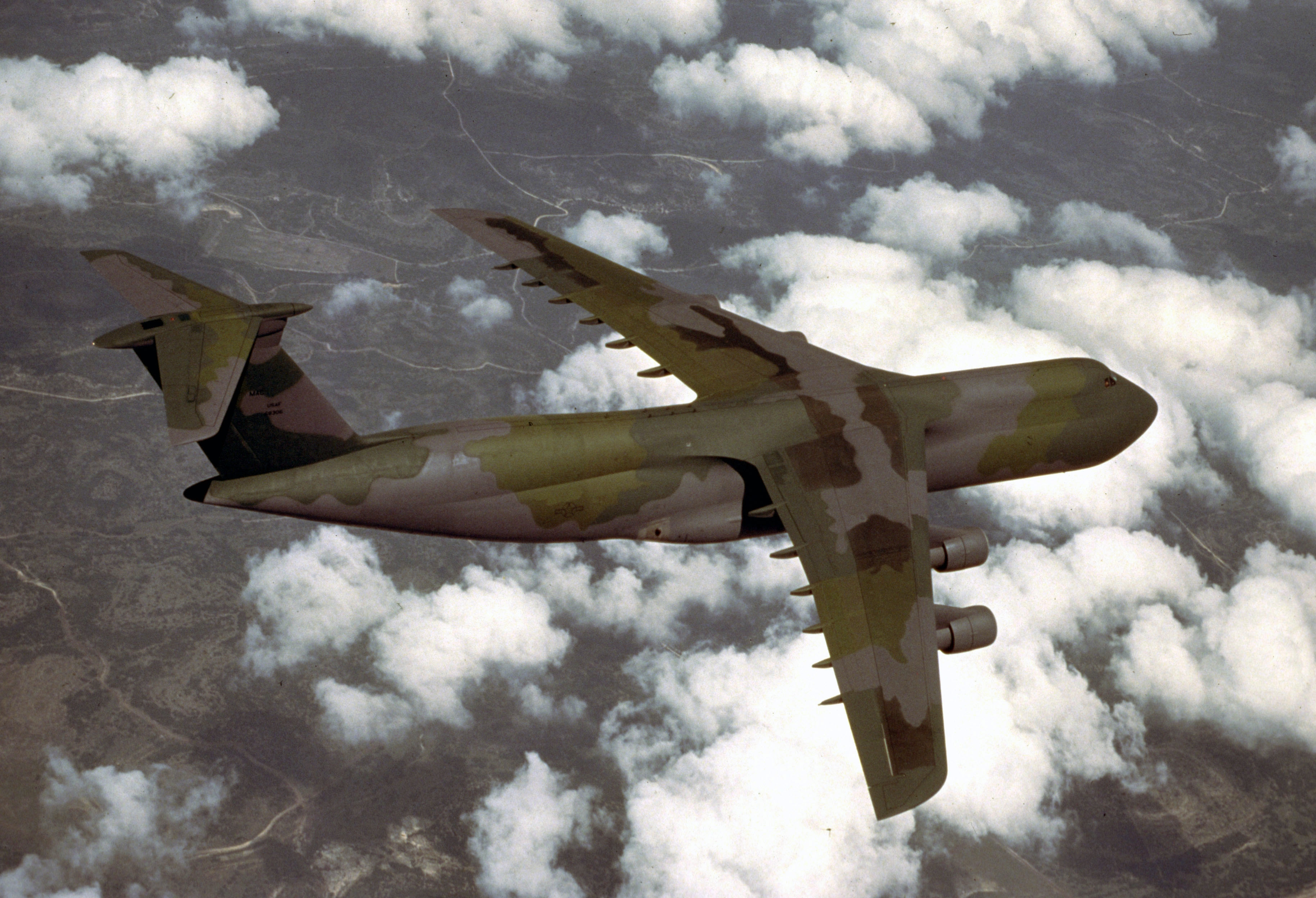
C-5A Galaxy 66-8306 in Euro-1 Camouflage

The 443d Airlift Wing is an inactive unit of the United States Air Force. Its last assignment was with Air Mobility Command, being stationed at Altus Air Force Base, Oklahoma. It was inactivated on October 1, 1992.

== History ==
For related history, see 443d Operations Group

In 1949, the 443d Troop Carrier Wing, Medium was established and trained as a reserve troop carrier wing under supervision of the 2596th Air Force Reserve Training Center, June 1949 – April 1951.

The 443d was brought to active duty at Donaldson Air Force Base, South Carolina on 9 August 1951, as a training wing by Tactical Air Command. For almost two years, the 443d participated in tactical exercises in operations, training troop-carrier aircrews using Curtiss C-46 Commandos for assignment to the Far East, and worked closely with other troop carrier groups to test and evaluate new troop carrier doctrine and procedures. With the nearing end of the Korean War, the 443d was inactivated on 8 January 1953.

In January 1966, Military Airlift Command (MAC) reactivated the 443d at Tinker Air Force Base, Oklahoma, replacing the inactivated Military Air Transport Service 1707th Air Transport Wing, Heavy. The 443d became the primary USAF wing charged with training air and ground crews of Douglas C-124 Globemaster II and the new Lockheed C-141 Starlifter heavy transports, while simultaneously maintaining a capability to perform airlift operations worldwide.

With the retirement of the prop-driven C-124 Globemaster II from active service, training diminished in 1967 and ceased in 1968, being replaced by training air and ground crews on the new Lockheed C-5 Galaxy, a very heavy lift transport, in 1969. The wing moved from Tinker to Altus Air Force Base, Oklahoma, in 1969. The wing performed this training mission until 1992 when C-5 and C-141 training was consolidated after the end of the Cold War.

Air Mobility Command reorganized Air Force airlift units in 1992, and the 443d was inactivated on 1 October 1992, as part of the Air Force Heritage program, where notable units were retained and reassigned after the Cold War.

The new 97th Air Mobility Wing, a former Eighth Air Force World War II bombardment group, and later Strategic Air Command bombardment wing, absorbed the personnel, equipment and aircraft of the 443d upon its inactivation in an administrative transfer.

This occurred after the BRAC decision to close Eaker Air Force Base in Blytheville, Arkansas. Eaker's former wing was the 97th Bombardment Wing under SAC, and later ACC.

== Lineage ==
- Established as the 443d Troop Carrier Wing, Medium on 10 May 1949

Activated in the reserve on 27 June 1949
Ordered to active service on 1 May 1951
Inactivated on 8 January 1953

- Redesignated 443d Military Airlift Wing, Training and activated on 27 December 1965 (not organized)

Organized on 8 January 1966
Inactivated 1 October 1992

- Converted to provisional status and redesignated 443d Air Expeditionary Wing on 12 June 2002

=== Assignments ===
- Twelfth Air Force, 27 June 1949
- Fourteenth Air Force, 1 July 1950
- Tactical Air Command, 2 May 1951
- Eighteenth Air Force, 1 June 1951 – 8 January 1953
- Military Air Transport Service (later Military Airlift Command), 27 December 1965
- Twenty-Second Air Force, 1 April 1973 – 1 October 1992
- Air Mobility Command to activate or inactivate as needed on 12 June 2002

=== Stations ===
- Hensley Field, Texas, 27 June 1949
- Donaldson Air Force Base, South Carolina, 9 August 1951 – 8 January 1953
- Tinker Air Force Base, Oklahoma, 8 January 1966
- Altus Air Force Base, Oklahoma, 5 May 1969 – 1 October 1992

=== Components ===
Groups

- 443d Troop Carrier Group (later 443d Operations Group0: 27 June 1949 – 8 January 1953, 1 October 1991 – 1 October 1992

Squadrons

- 56th Military Airlift Squadron: 8 January 1966 – 1 October 1992 (C-124A/C 1966–68, and, C-5A/B 1969–92)
- 57th Military Airlift Squadron: 8 January 1966 – 1 October 1992 (C-141A/B)

=== Aircraft ===
- Curtiss C-46 Commando, 1949–1952
- Fairchild C-119 Flying Boxcar, 1952–1953
- Douglas C-124 Globemaster II, 1966–1968
- Lockheed C-141 Starlifter, 1966–1992
- Lockheed C-5 Galaxy, 1969–1992
