= Dinjan Airfield =

Indian Air Force Station, Assam

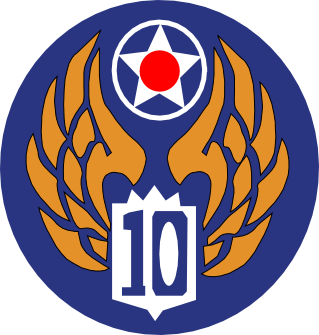
Dinjan Airfield
- Part of Tenth Air Force
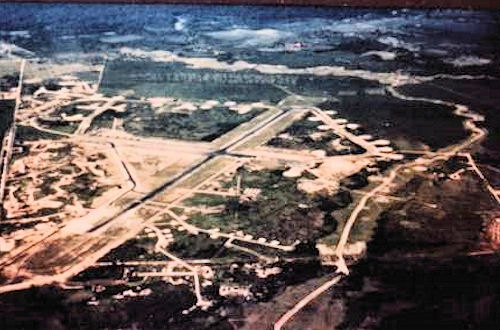
- An aerial view of Dinjan airfield in about 1945

Site information
- Type: Military airfield
- Controlled by: Indian Airforce

Location
- Location of the airfield in Assam Dinjan Airfield (India)
- Coordinates: 27°32′16.86″N 095°16′10.01″E

Site history
- Built: 1943
- In use: 1943-1945

Dinjan Airfield, also known as Dinjan Air Force Station, is an air base of Indian Air Force. Established as an air field in World War II, it is located in Dinjan, approximately seven miles northeast of Chabua, in the state of Assam, India.

The fall of Singapore and Rangoon in early 1942 propelled Dinjan airbase to be the centre of attention as the main supply line between India and China. It housed a major hospital for evacuees from Burma during the Second World War. It was abandoned after the war, till 1964 when Indian Air Force established its surveillance base here. It houses one squadron of Apache attack helicopters.

== History ==
Dinjan Airfield was built on an Assam tea plantation by thousands of plantation laborers, beginning in March 1942, as a result of the Japanese invasion of Burma in December 1941. It opened in the spring of 1942 with No 5 Squadron RAF and a squadron of Curtis Mohawk fighter aircraft, which remained until the Autumn of 1942 before moving to Agatala; This unit's primary mission was the protection of cargo aircraft flying over The Hump from nearby Chabua Airfield to China.

The site was also occupied by 11th Bombardment Squadron (7th Bombardment Group), USAAF between June and October 1942. The squadron was initially equipped with a mixture of B-25 Mitchells and LB-30s (B-24A Liberators) and flew missions against targets in Burma.

In October 1942, the Indian Air Task Force was activated at Dinjan to support Chinese resistance along the Salween River by hitting supply lines in central and southern Burma. The task force controlled operational activities of all Army Air Force units in India.

- 9th Photo Reconnaissance Squadron, March - July 1943; September 1943 - May 1944 (Detachment)
- 20th Tactical Reconnaissance Squadron, May - June 1944

Assigned to Assam American Base Command (part of India Air Task Force). The mission of these units was photographic mapping in Burma. It flew F-4/F-5 (P-38) Lightnings.

- 51st Fighter Group, October 1942 - October 1943

This unit was equipped with Curtiss P-40 Warhawks and Lockheed P-38 Lightnings. The group defended the Indian terminus of the "Hump" airlift route over the Himalayan Mountains and airfields in that area. The group flew strafing, bombing, reconnaissance and patrol missions in support of Allied ground troops during a Japanese offensive in northern Burma in 1943. It was transferred from Dinjan to Kunming, China and was reassigned from the Tenth to the Fourteenth Air Force.

- 311th Fighter Group, October 1943 - July 1944

Using A-36 Apaches and P-51 Mustangs, the group supported Allied ground forces in northern Burma; it also escorted bombers that attacked Rangoon, Insein, and other targets; bombed enemy airfields at Myitkyina and Bhamo; and conducted patrol and reconnaissance missions to help protect transport planes that flew the 'Hump' route between India and China.

On 13 December 1943, 20 Japanese bombers, escorted by 25 fighters, hit Dinjan Airfield before US interceptors could make contact; however, little damage was done and the US fighters caught the attackers shortly afterward. 12 of the 20 Japanese bombers and five fighters were shot down.

In the summer of 1944 with the lessening of the Japanese air threat, the base became a combat cargo airfield, supporting Allied ground forces fighting in Burma.

- 443d Troop Carrier Group, July - October 1944; May - August 1945

It flew C-47s. The group's personnel and aircraft were assigned to the 1st Combat Cargo Group. Their missions were primarily concerned with support for Allied forces that were driving southward through Burma, but the 443rd also made many flights to China.

- 3d Combat Cargo Group, August 1944 - June 1945

This unit also flew C-47s; it supported ground forces during the battle for northern Burma and the subsequent Allied drive southward. It flew Allied troops and materiel to the front, transporting gasoline, oil, vehicles, engineering and signals equipment and other items that the group either landed or dropped in Burma. It also evacuated wounded personnel to India. It was reassigned to Myitkjina Airfield in Burma.

- 427th Night Fighter Squadron, May - June 1945

Squadron headquarters only. It operated P-61 Black Widow aircraft out of forward bases in China.

With the end of combat in September 1945, Dinjan Airfield was abandoned. Today, the runways of the former airfield can still be seen from aerial photography, however the base is overrun with vegetation and the land has returned to its natural state.

== See also ==
- Objective, Burma!
