= 330th =

330th may refer to:

- 330th Aircraft Sustainment Group, inactive group of the United States Air Force
- 330th Aircraft Sustainment Wing, former wing of the United States Air Force
- 330th Bombardment Group (VH), former bomber group of the United States Army Air Forces active during World War II
- 330th Combat Training Squadron, unit of the United States Air Force
- 330th Fighter-Interceptor Squadron, former unit of the United States Air Force
- 330th Rifle Division (Soviet Union), former infantry division of the Red Army founded during World War II

== See also ==
- 330 (number)
- 330, the year 330 (CCCXXX) of the Julian calendar
