= UIH (disambiguation) =

UIH refers to the Ulsiin Ih Hural, the unicameral parliament of Mongolia.

UIH may also refer to:

- Phu Cat Airport, the IATA code UIH
- Lianyungang railway station, the telegraph code UIH
- Phù Cát Air Base, the IATA code UIH
- Qui Nhon Airfield, the former IATA code UIH
