= 459th Airlift Squadron =

459th Airlift Squadron

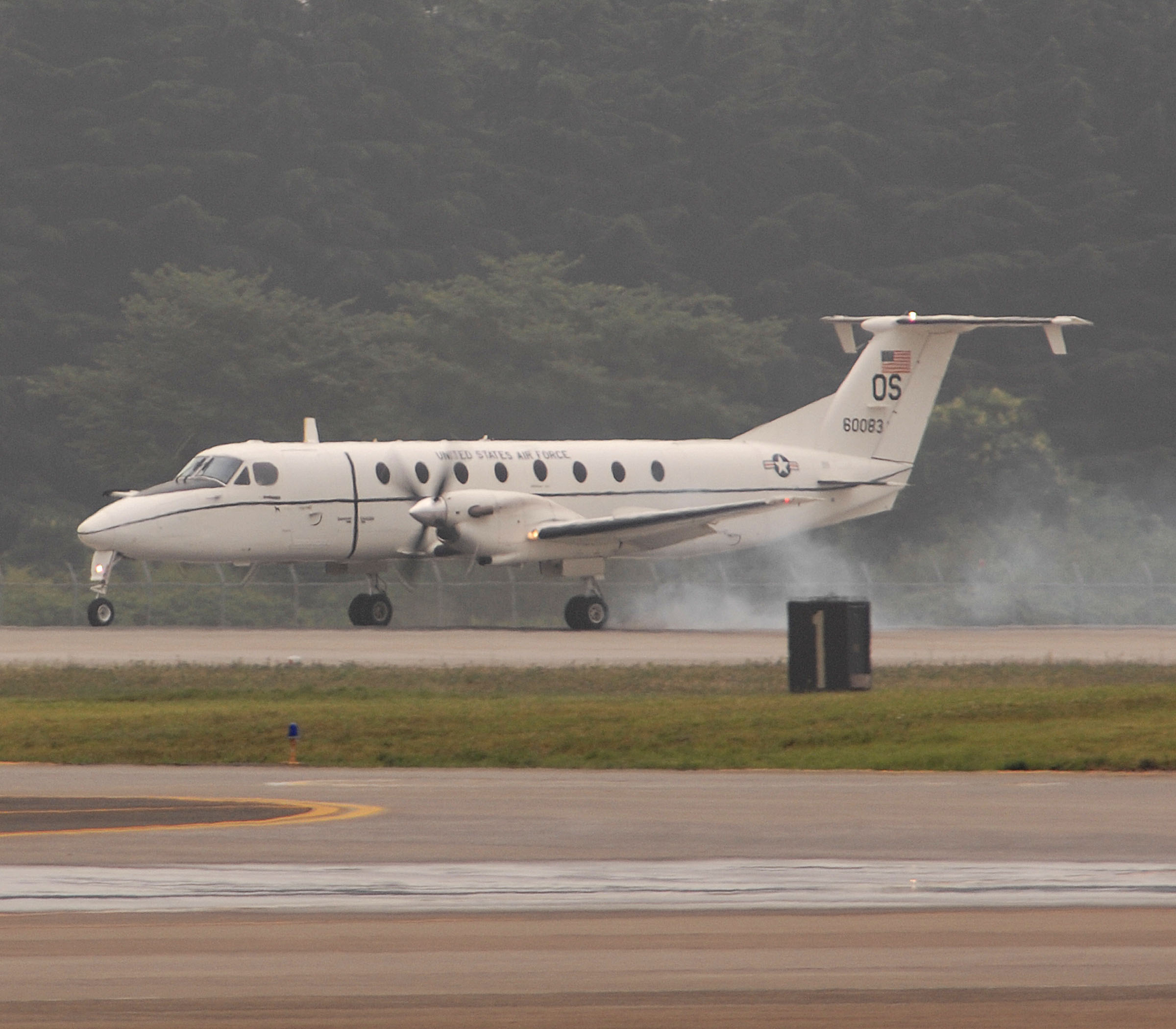
- The first squadron C-12J arriving at Yokota Air Base, 29 June 2007
- Active: 1942–1944; 1944–1945; 1952–1952; 1966–1970; 1975–1993; 1993–present
- Country: United States
- Branch: United States Air Force
- Role: Airlift
- Part of: Pacific Air Forces
- Garrison/HQ: Yokota Air Base
- Decorations: Distinguished Unit Citation; Presidential Unit Citation; Air Force Outstanding Unit Award; Republic of Vietnam Gallantry Cross with Palm

Insignia
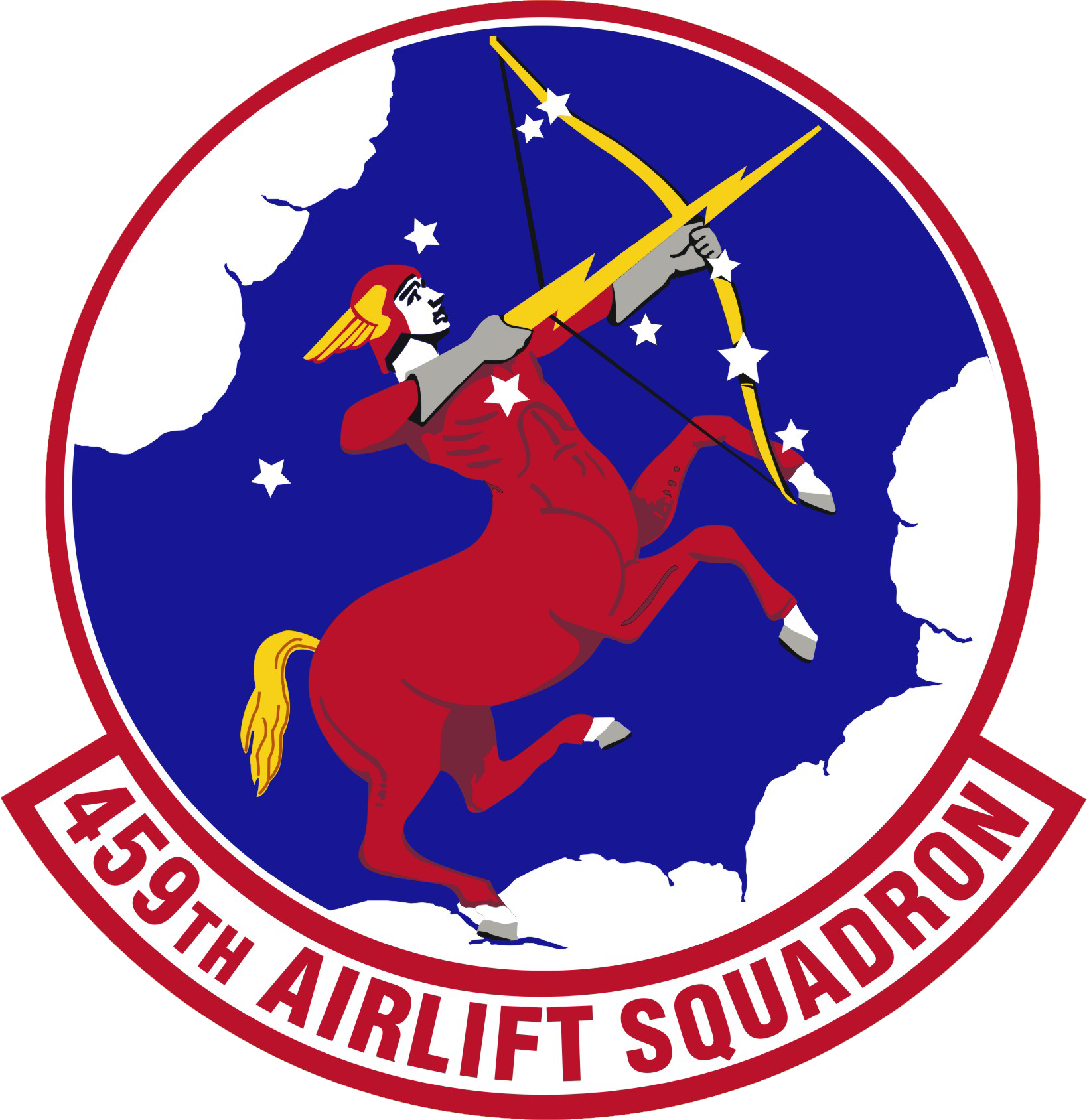
- 459th Airlift Squadron emblem (Note: Approved 13 October 2011.)

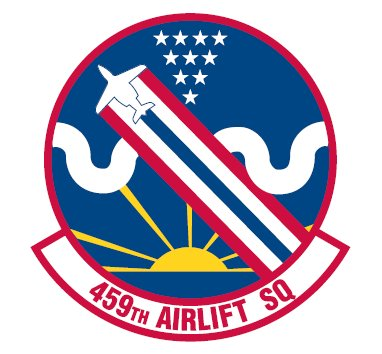
- 459th Airlift Squadron emblem (Note: Approved 1 June 1982. Description: On a Blue disc edged with a narrow Red border a white undulating aerodynamic shape fesswise throughout between in base a Yellow sun emitting seven Yellow rays and in the top of the disc a constellation of ten White stars palewise four, three, two and one, overall five contrails bendwise Red, White, Blue, White, Red, terminating at a White aircraft ascending bendwise garnished Black.)

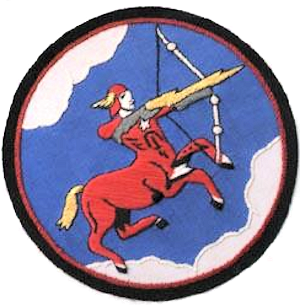
- 459th Bombardment Squadron emblem (Note: Approved 9 April 1945. Description: On a light turquoise blue disc, border red, piped white, a red centaur having gold tail, white face, and gray hoofs, wearing a red helmet, winged gold, and gray gloves, reared up on hind legs on white cloud formation in base, facing toward sinister, and shooting a jagged gold lightning bolt affixed to bow string of curved bow of the last [color mentioned], all beneath a white cloud formation in dexter chief and flecked with white, five-point stars.)

The 459th Airlift Squadron is an active United States Air Force unit assigned to the 374th Airlift Wing at Yokota Air Base, Japan. It has been stationed at Yokota since 1993. It has performed its current mission since activating in 1975 as the 1400th Military Airlift Squadron. The 1400th Squadron was consolidated with the 459th in 1991.

The squadron was first activated during World War II as the 459th Bombardment Squadron. It was a replacement training unit for heavy bomber crews until being inactivated in the spring of 1944 when the Army Air Forces reorganized its training and support units in the United States. It was reactivated the same day as a Boeing B-29 Superfortress unit. The unit deployed to the Pacific Ocean Theater in early 1945 and participated in the strategic bombing campaign against Japan until V-J Day, earning two Distinguished Unit Citations for its actions. The squadron returned to the United States in December 1945 and was inactivated.

The squadron was redesignated the 459th Troop Carrier Squadron and activated in the reserve in 1952, but was quickly inactivated as reserve units that had been mobilized for the Korean War were released from active duty. As the Air Force assumed the light airlift mission from the Army, the squadron was again activated on New Year's Day 1967. It served in combat in Vietnam until June 1970, earning an additional Presidential Unit Citation and three Air Force Outstanding Unit Awards with Combat "V" Device before inactivating in theater.

== Mission ==
The squadron operates Bell UH-1N Twin Huey and Beechcraft C-12J Huron aircraft, performing passenger transport (including VIPs), aeromedical evacuation and search and rescue missions.

== History ==
=== World War II ===
==== Bombardment training unit ====
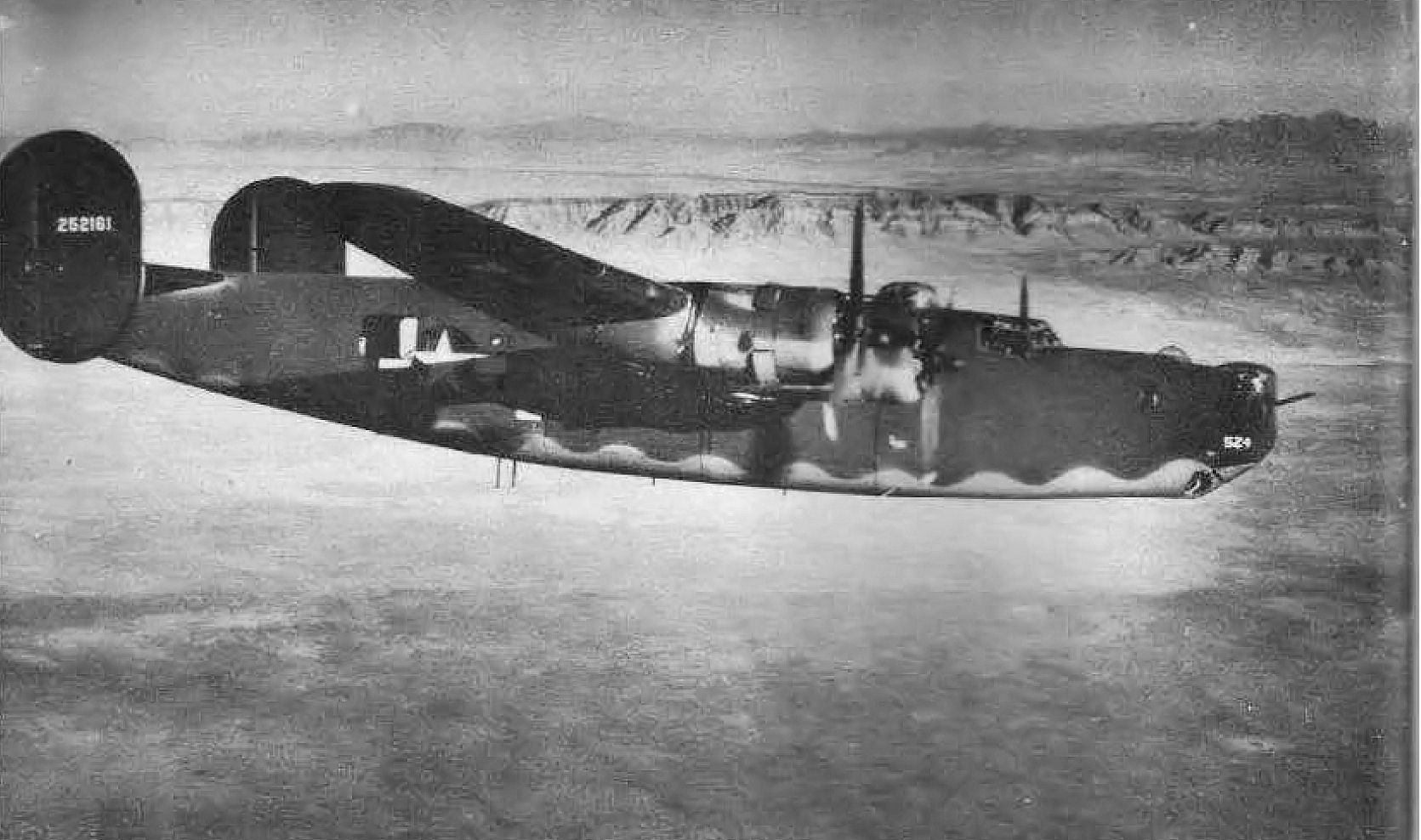
B-24 Liberator 42-52161 from Alamogordo Army Airfield (Note: Aircraft is Ford Motors built Consolidated B-24H-10-FO Liberator, serial 42-52161. It later deployed to Europe and was shot down on 22 February 1944. Missing Aircrew Report 2832.)

The squadron was first activated at Salt Lake City Army Air Base, Utah on 6 July 1942 as one of the original four squadrons of the 330th Bombardment Group. Although equipped early on with some Boeing B-17 Flying Fortresses, it became a Consolidated B-24 Liberator Operational Training Unit (OTU), moving to Biggs Field, Texas by early September. The OTU program was patterned after the unit training system of the Royal Air Force and involved the use of an oversized parent unit to provide cadres to "satellite groups" It then assumed responsibility for their training and oversaw their expansion with graduates of Army Air Forces Training Command schools to become effective combat units. Phase I training concentrated on individual training in crewmember specialties. Phase II training emphasized the coordination for the crew to act as a team. The final phase concentrated on operation as a unit.

By early 1944 most units had been activated and almost three quarters of them had deployed overseas. With the exception of special programs, like forming Boeing B-29 Superfortress units, training “fillers” for existing units became more important than unit training. The squadron then became a Replacement Training Unit (RTU). RTUs were also oversized unit, but their mission was to train individual pilots or aircrews.

However, the Army Air Forces was finding that standard military units like the 459th, whose manning was based on relatively inflexible tables of organization were proving not well adapted to the training mission, even more so to the replacement mission. Accordingly, the Army Air Forces adopted a more functional system in which each base was organized into a separate numbered unit. As a result, the 330th Bombardment Group and its components, including the 459th, along with all supporting units at Biggs were inactivated or disbanded on 1 April 1944 and replaced by the 235th AAF Base Unit (Combat Crew Training School, Bombardment, Very Heavy).

==== B-29 Superfortress operations against Japan ====
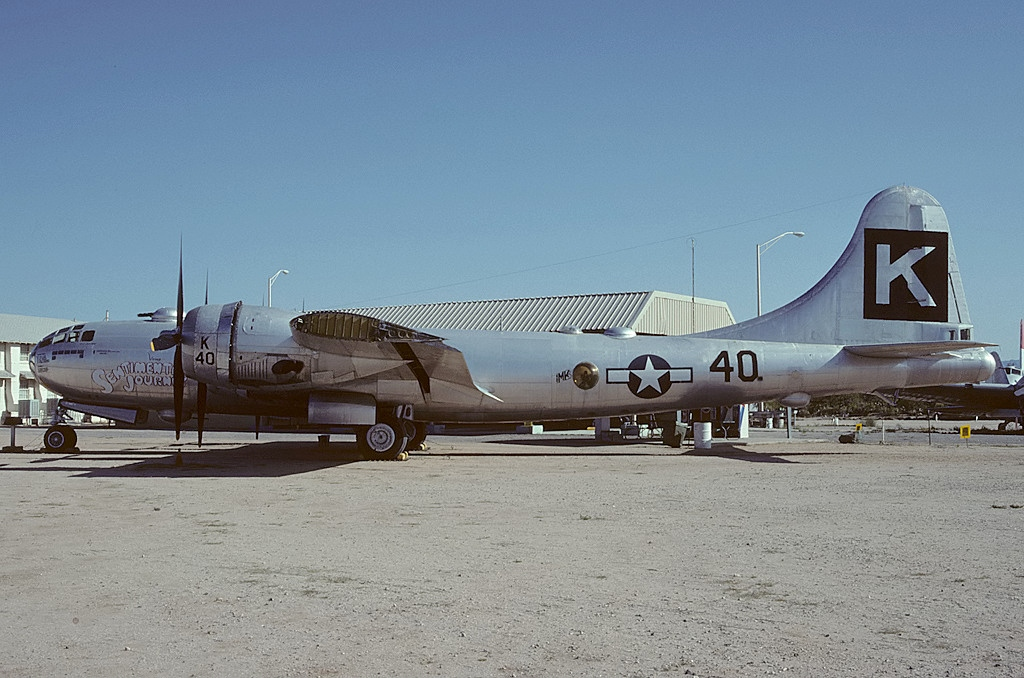
Squadron B-29 Superfortress (Note: Aircraft is Boeing B-29-75-BW Superfortress, serial 44-70016, Sentimental Journey, Quaker City. After the war this aircraft served as a TB-29 radar evaluation plane, Dopey. Transferred to storage in June 1959, this plane is now on display at the Pima Air Museum on loan from the National Museum of the United States Air Force. Baugher, Joe (9 October 2023). "1944 USAF Serial Numbers". Joe Baugher.)

The squadron was activated the same day at Walker Army Air Field, Kansas as a Boeing B-29 unit. While waiting for new B-29s to come off the production line, it again flew B-17 Flying Fortresses for a short time. It trained at Walker and at Dalhart Army Air Field, Texas until January 1945, when it deployed to the Pacific.

The squadron arrived at its combat station, North Field, Guam in the Mariana Islands in early February 1945. Because the results of high altitude B-29 raids on Japan were disappointing. XXI Bomber Command switched to low altitude night area attacks with incendiaries beginning in March 1945. It flew its first combat mission, an attack on the Hodogaya chemical plant in Koriyama, Japan on 12 April 1945.

During April and May 1945, the squadron was diverted from the strategic campaign against Japan to support Operation Iceberg, the invasion of Okinawa. It struck air bases from which kamikaze attacks were being launched. Many of these bases were located on Kyushu, only 300 miles from Okinawa. The attacks directly impacted kamikaze launches, but also forced the Japanese military to retain fighter aircraft to defend the Japanese Special Attack Units that otherwise might have been used to challenge air superiority over Okinawa. (Note: 75% of Twentieth Air Force's missions in April and May 1945 were flown to support Operation Iceberg. Cate & Olson p. 631.)

The squadron resumed attacking urban industrial areas until the end of the war in August 1945. It was awarded a Distinguished Unit Citation (DUC) for incendiary raids on the industrial sections of Tokushima and Gifu and a strike against the hydroelectrical power center at Kofu in July 1945. It received a second DUC for a mission attacking the Nakajima aircraft engine plant at Musashino near Tokyo in August.

Following V-J Day the squadron dropped food and supplies to Allied prisoners of war and participated in several show of force missions over Japan. It departed the theater in November and was inactivated at Camp Anza, the Port of Embarkation in December 1945.

=== Air Force reserve ===
The reserve mobilization for the Korean War had left the reserve without aircraft. In September 1951, Continental Air Command (ConAC) formed the 917th Reserve Training Wing to train reservists at Greater Pittsburgh Airport, Pennsylvania. Anticipating the return of mission aircraft to reserve units, ConAC replaced the 917th Wing with the 330th Troop Carrier Wing on 14 June 1952. The squadron was redesignated the 459th Troop Carrier Squadron and activated the same day. It is not clear whether the squadron possessed its own aircraft or flew the Curtiss C-46 Commandos of the 2253rd Air Force Reserve Training Center, which was responsible for its training. However, this activation was short lived, as the 330th was replaced by the 375th Troop Carrier Wing, which was released from active duty on 14 July 1952, and which had been mobilized at Greater Pittsburgh in 1951. The 459th was inactivated and transferred its personnel to the 57th Troop Carrier Squadron, which was simultaneously activated.

=== Vietnam War ===
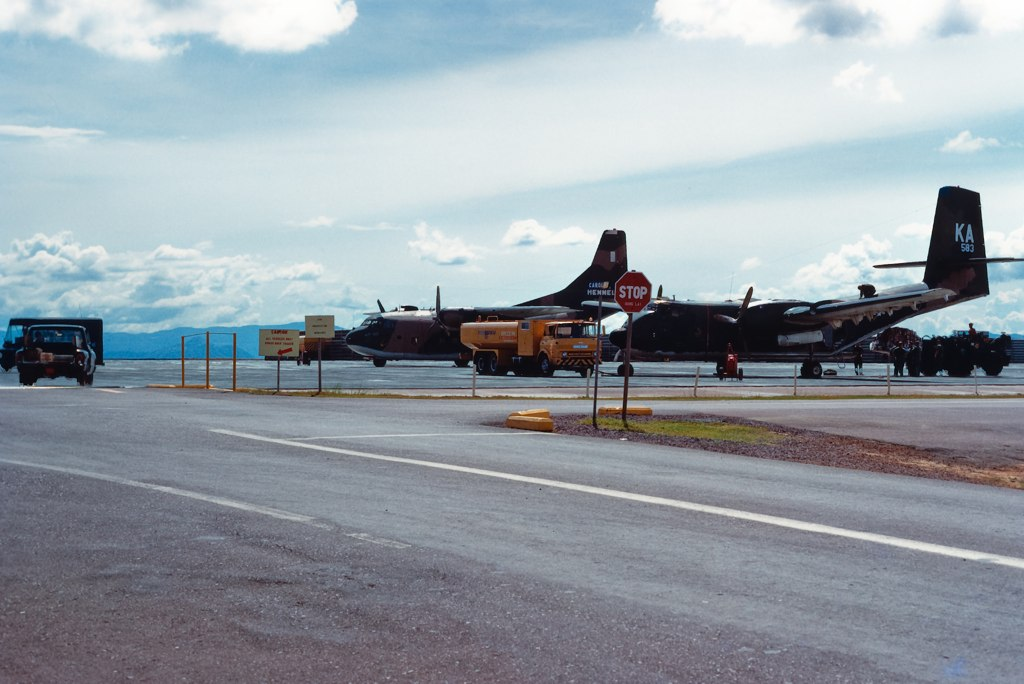
483d Wing C-7B Caribou at Phu Cat Air Base in 1969 (Note: Aircraft was originally built as de Haviland Canada AC-1A-DH Caribou, serial 62-12583. It was redesignated as a CV-2A before delivery to the Army in 1963 and C-7A on transfer to the Air Force. It served with the 92nd Aviation Company before being transferred to the Air Force and from June to October 1969 operated with Air America from June to October 1969. It was transferred to the VNAF in 1972. Baugher, Joe (25 July 2023). "1962 USAF Serial Numbers". Joe Baugher.)

In August 1966, the Air Force and the Army began implementing Project Red Leaf, which would transfer responsibility for the de Havilland Canada C-7 Caribou from the Army to the Air Force following the Johnson-McConnell agreement of 1966. At Qui Nhon Airfield, South Vietnam, Air Force personnel began being assigned to the 92nd Aviation Company. The Department of Defense had ordered that the 483d Tactical Airlift Wing's new squadrons be located on Air Force installations, not on Army posts, and the cadre of the wing at Cam Ranh Bay Air Base began planning to move squadron level operations from the small Army camps they were operating from to permanent sites when the Air Force units were activated. In December, the company began moving to Phu Cat Air Base, although Phu Cat only had a 3,000 feet (910 m) laterite strip at the time and it was not until April that permanent facilities and a 10,000 feet (3,000 m) runway was ready for use. On 1 January 1967, the 459th Squadron was organized and took over Caribou operations from the 92nd Company.

The squadron provided intratheater airlift to support United States military civic actions, combat support and civic assistance throughout the Republic of Vietnam. This included airland and airdrop assault missions. It also maintained detachments at Da Nang Air Base and Pleiku Air Base. The Da Nang detachment undertook many of the tasks in the northern area of South Viet Nam formerly performed by Fairchild C-123 Providers. (Note: The 311th Air Commando Squadron with C-123s was located at Da Nang.) It made runs to Civilian Irregular Defense Group camps and the US Army posts nearby. The Pleiku detachment not only supported nearby special forces units, but flew a daily passenger run linking Pleiku, Camp Holloway, Qui Nhon Airfield, Tuy Hoa Air Base and Cam Ranh Bay. In the summer of 1967, Pleiku operations were taken over by the 457th and 458th Tactical Airlift Squadrons, operating from Cam Ranh Bay as the squadron shifted its operations to the coastal provinces north of Qui Nhon.

In April 1970, the squadron helped break the siege of Dak Seang Special Forces Camp. North Vietnamese forces had surrounded the camp, and learning from the success of air resupply during their 1969 attack on the Ben Het Camp, also established anti-aircraft artillery positions along likely air resupply corridors. On the first day of the siege, two C-7s were diverted from their scheduled missions and staged out of Pleiku to make the first airdrops to the camp. Resupply of the camp was so urgent that all drop-qualified crews of the 483rd Tactical Airlift Wing were ordered to Pleiku to support the operation and eleven sorties were flown that day with cover from Douglas A-1 Skyraiders. Crews approached the camp from the north or south to use terrain to mask their approaches from enemy flak. Loss of the third Caribou in five days prompted a move to resupply the camp with night drops, with cover and illumination provided by Fairchild AC-119 Stinger gunships. All 483rd Wing squadrons participated in the operation. It earned a second Presidential Unit Citation for this action, evacuation of over 2000 refugees from Cambodia, and transportation of the Presidential Southeast Asia Investigation Team to various remote locations in South Vietnam.

The squadron was inactivated in June 1970 with the beginning of the withdrawal of the United States military from Viet Nam.

=== Administrative airlift ===
==== Operations in the western United States ====
The second predecessor of the squadron was activated at Norton Air Force Base, California on 1 April 1975 as the 1400th Military Airlift Squadron and assigned to the 89th Military Airlift Wing. The 1401st was one of the squadrons formed when the Air Force decided to consolidate its administrative airlift fleet under Military Airlift Command. The Air Force also decided the administrative airlift fleet would become all jet, using North American T-39 Sabreliners, although the 459th also flew turboprop powered Beechcraft C-12 Hurons. In 1978, the administrative airlift squadrons transferred to the 375th Aeromedical Airlift Wing, and until 1991, it also flew aeromedical evacuation missions. In 1984, it converted from the Sabreliner to the Learjet C-21. In December 1991, the two squadrons were consolidated as the 459th Airlift Squadron.

In 1989, the Base Closure Commission recommended that Norton be closed. As a result, in October 1992 the squadron moved to nearby March Air Force Base, California, where it was assigned to the 22d Operations Group. However, March was shortly being transferred to Air Force Reserve Command. As a result, the squadron was inactivated on 1 October 1993.

==== Operations in the Pacific ====
The squadron was activated the same day at Yokota Air Base, Japan, where it was equipped with Bell UH-1N Twin Hueys. It operates four of them. In 2016, two of the squadron's Twin Hueys were equipped with hoists, giving them the ability to participate in search and rescue missions. Until 2007, it also operated the C-21 Learjet. It swapped them for C-12J Hurons, and operates 75% of the Air Force's "J" model Hurons. Since 2017, the squadron's C-12Js have been the primary aeromedical evacuation aircraft in the western Pacific. In August 2025, the squadron flew its last sortie with the UH-1 helicopter. No direct replacement helicopter is programmed for the squadron's short range airlift.

== Lineage ==
459th Airlift Squadron

- Constituted as the 459th Bombardment Squadron (Heavy) on 1 July 1942

Activated on 6 July 1942
Inactivated on 1 April 1944

- Redesignated 459th Bombardment Squadron, Very Heavy and activated on 1 April 1944

Inactivated on 21 December 1945

- Redesignated 459th Troop Carrier Squadron, Medium on 26 May 1952

Activated in the reserve on 14 June 1952
Inactivated on 14 July 1952

- Redesignated 459th Troop Carrier Squadron and activated, on 12 October 1966 (not organized)

Organized on 1 January 1967
Redesignated 459th Tactical Airlift Squadron on 1 August 1967
Inactivated on 1 June 1970

- Consolidated with the 1400th Military Airlift Squadron on 1 December 1991 as the 459th Airlift Squadron

Inactivated on 1 October 1993
Activated on 1 October 1993

1400th Military Airlift Squadron

- Designated as the 1400th Military Airlift Squadron and activated on 1 April 1975
- Consolidated with the 459th Tactical Airlift Squadron on 1 December 1991 as the 459th Airlift Squadron

=== Assignments ===
- 330th Bombardment Group, 6 July 1952 – 1 April 1944
- 330th Bombardment Group, 1 April 1944 – 27 December 1945
- 330th Troop Carrier Group, 14 June 1952 – 14 July 1952
- Pacific Air Forces, 12 October 1966 (not organized)
- 483d Troop Carrier Wing (later 483d Tactical Airlift Wing), 1 January 1967 – 1 June 1970
- 89th Military Airlift Wing, 1 April 1975
- 375th Aeromedical Airlift Wing (later 375th Military Airlift Wing), 15 March 1978
- 375th Operations Group, 1 December 1991
- 22d Operations Group, 1 April 1993 – 1 October 1993
- 374th Operations Group, 1 October 1993 – present

=== Stations ===
- Salt Lake City Army Air Base, Utah, 6 July 1942
- Alamogordo Army Air Field, New Mexico, 1 August 1942
- Biggs Field, Texas, 2 September 1942
- Alamogordo Army Air Field, New Mexico, 29 November 1942
- Biggs Field, Texas, 5 April 1943 – 1 April 1944
- Walker Army Air Field, Kansas, 1 April 1944
- Dalhart Army Air Field, Texas, 25 May 1944
- Walker Army Air Field, Kansas, 1 August 1944 – 7 January 1945
- North Field, Guam, Mariana Islands, 18 February – 19 November 1945
- Camp Anza, California, c. 18–27 December 1945
- Greater Pittsburgh Airport, Pennsylvania, 14 June 1952 − 14 July 1952
- Phu Cat Air Base, South Vietnam, 1 January 1966 – 1 June 1970
- Norton Air Force Base, California, 1 April 1975
- March Air Force Base, California, 15 October 1992 – 1 October 1993
- Yokota Air Base, Japan, 1 October 1993 – present

=== Aircraft ===
- Boeing B-17 Flying Fortress (1942, 1944)
- Consolidated B-24 Liberator (1942–1944)
- Boeing B-29 Superfortress (1944–1945)
- de Havilland Canada C-7 Caribou (1967–1970)
- North American T-39 (later CT-39) Sabreliner (1975–1984)
- Learjet C-21 (1984-1993, 1993–2007)
- Beechcraft C-12 Huron (2007–present)
- Bell UH-1N Twin Huey (1993–2025)

=== Awards and campaigns ===
Award streamer	Award	Dates	Notes
	Distinguished Unit Citation	3–9 July 1945	Japan, 459th Bombardment Squadron
	Distinguished Unit Citation	8 August 1945	Tokyo, 459th Bombardment Squadron
	Presidential Unit Citation	1 January – 12 May 1968	Southeast Asia, 459th Tactical Airlift Squadron
	Presidential Unit Citation	1 April – 31 May 1970	Southeast Asia, 459th Tactical Airlift Squadron
	Presidential Unit Citation (Navy)	20 January – 31 March 1968	Khe San, 459th Tactical Airlift Squadron
	Air Force Outstanding Unit Award with Combat "V" Device	1 January – 30 April 1967	459th Troop Carrier Squadron
	Air Force Outstanding Unit Award with Combat "V" Device	1 May 1967 – 30 April 1968	459th Troop Carrier Squadron (later 459th Tactical Airlift Squadron)
	Air Force Outstanding Unit Award	1 July – 31 December 1975	1400th Military Airlift Squadron
	Air Force Outstanding Unit Award	1 January 1976 – 31 January 1977	1400th Military Airlift Squadron
	Air Force Outstanding Unit Award	1 July 1981 – 30 June 1983	1400th Military Airlift Squadron
	Air Force Outstanding Unit Award	1 June 1986 – 31 July 1988	1400th Military Airlift Squadron
	Air Force Outstanding Unit Award	1 July 1983 – 1 October 1993	1400th Military Airlift Squadron (later 459th Airlift Squadron)
	Air Force Outstanding Unit Award	[1 October 1993] – 1 October 1994	459th Airlift Squadron
	Air Force Outstanding Unit Award	1 October 1994 – 30 September 1996	459th Airlift Squadron
	Air Force Outstanding Unit Award	1 October 1996 – 30 September 1997	459th Airlift Squadron
	Air Force Outstanding Unit Award	1 October 1998 – 30 September 2000	459th Airlift Squadron
	Air Force Outstanding Unit Award	1 October 2000 – 30 September 2002	459th Airlift Squadron
	Air Force Outstanding Unit Award	1 October 2003 – 30 September 2005	459th Airlift Squadron
	Air Force Outstanding Unit Award	2 November 2006 – 1 November 2008	459th Airlift Squadron
	Air Force Outstanding Unit Award	2 November 2008 – 1 November 2009	459th Airlift Squadron
	Air Force Outstanding Unit Award	2 November 2009 – 1 November 2011	459th Airlift Squadron
	Air Force Outstanding Unit Award	2 November 2011 – 1 November 2012	459th Airlift Squadron
	Air Force Outstanding Unit Award	2 November 2013 – 1 November 2014	459th Airlift Squadron
	Air Force Outstanding Unit Award	2 November 2014 – 1 November 2015	459th Airlift Squadron
	Vietnamese Gallantry Cross with Palm	1 January 1967 – 1 June 1970 (Note: Per AFHRA Factsheet. The AF Personnel Center lists three awards of the Gallantry Cross.)	459th Troop Carrier Squadron (later 459th Tactical Airlift Squadron)

Campaign Streamer	Campaign	Dates	Notes
	American Theater without inscription	6 July 1942–1 April 1944, 1 April 1944–7 January 1945	459th Bombardment Squadron
	Air Offensive, Japan	18 February 1945–2 September 1945	459th Bombardment Squadron
	Western Pacific	17 April 1945–2 September 1945	459th Bombardment Squadron
	Vietnam Air Offensive	1 January 1966–8 March 1967	459th Troop Carrier Squadron
	Vietnam Air Offensive, Phase II	9 March 1967–31 March 1968	459th Troop Carrier Squadron (later 459th Tactical Airlift Squadron)
	Vietnam Air/Ground 1968	22 January 1968–7 July 1968	459th Tactical Airlift Squadron
	Vietnam Air Offensive, Phase III	1 April 1968–31 October 1968	459th Tactical Airlift Squadron
	Vietnam Air Offensive, Phase IV	1 November 1968–22 February 1969	459th Tactical Airlift Squadron
	Tet 1969/Counteroffensive	23 February 1969–8 June 1969	459th Tactical Airlift Squadron
	Vietnam Summer-Fall 1969	9 June 1969–31 October 1969	459th Tactical Airlift Squadron
	Vietnam Winter-Spring 1970	3 November 1969–30 April 1970	459th Tactical Airlift Squadron
	Sanctuary Counteroffensive	1 May 1970–1 June 1970	459th Tactical Airlift Squadron
