= 330th Brigade =

330th Brigade may refer to:

- 330th Brigade, Royal Field Artillery, United Kingdom
- 330th Medical Brigade, United States

== See also ==
- 330th (disambiguation)
