= 16th Bombardment Operational Training Wing =

16th Bombardment Wing
- Active: 1940–1941; 1942–1946
- Country: United States
- Branch: United States Air Force
- Role: Bombardment training

Insignia
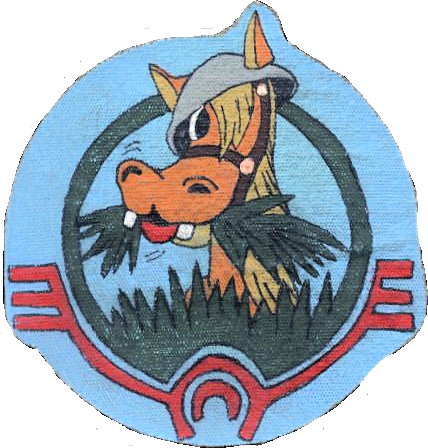
- 16th Bombardment Wing emblem

The 540th Combat Crew Training Wing is an inactive United States Air Force unit. It was last active in 1946 at Colorado Springs, assigned to Continental Air Forces. The wing was first activated in the pre-World War II buildup of the United States Army Air Corps, but was inactivated in 1942 and its personnel used as the cadre for another unit. The wing was activated the following year as the 16th Bombardment Training Wing, and controlled Operational Training Units for heavy bombers, and later very heavy bombers. Following the end of the war, it was inactivated. In 1985, it was redesignated, but has remained inactive since then.

== History ==
=== Prewar ===
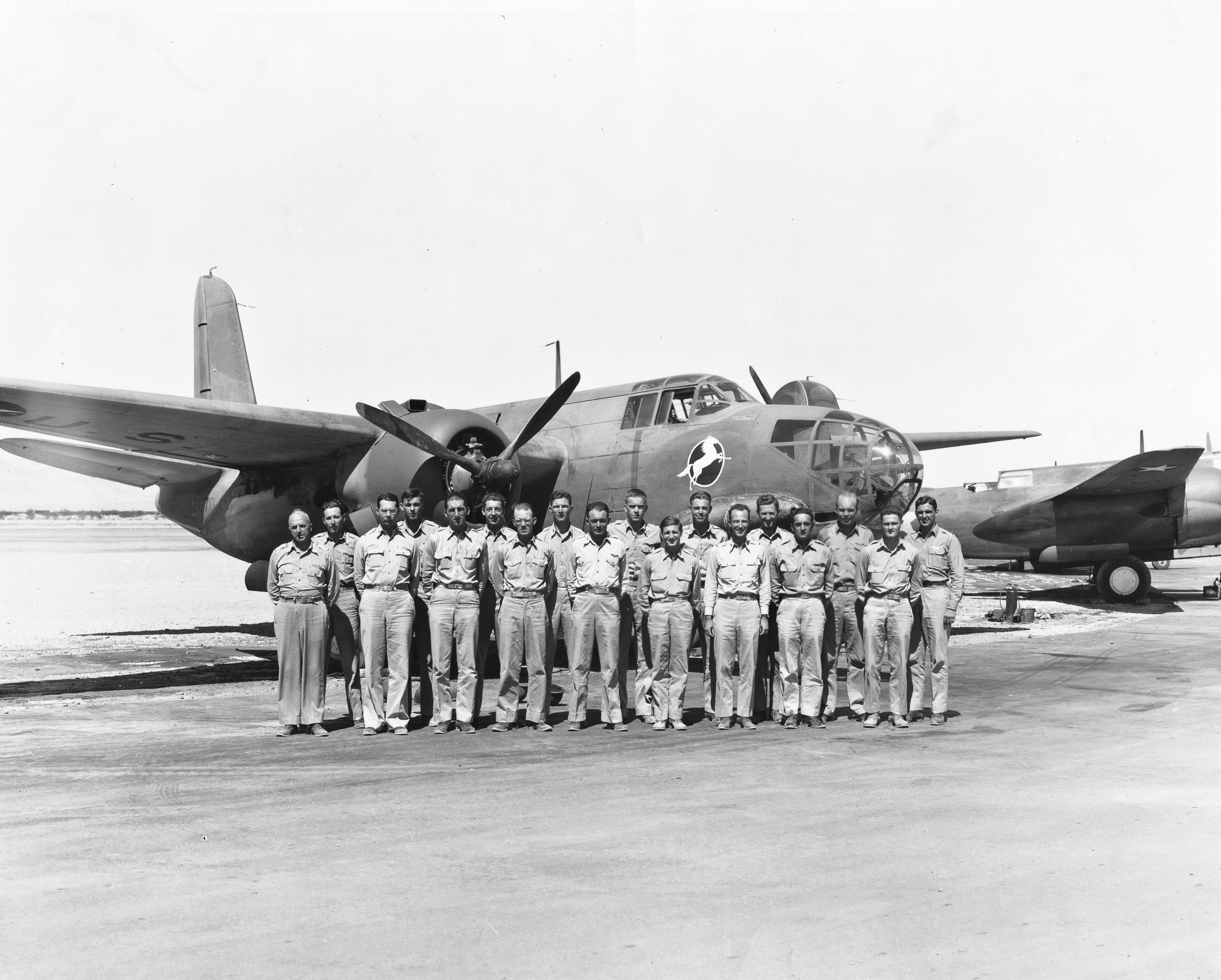
A-20 of the wing's 46th Bombardment Group

The 16th Bombardment Wing was first activated at Langley Field, Virginia, in December 1940 as part of the expansion of the Air Corps in response to the war in Europe (Woodring Plan). Its operational components, the 45th and 46th Bombardment Groups, were assigned in January 1941. It moved to Bowman Field, Kentucky, in the spring of 1941. In September 1941, the wing was inactivated and its personnel used to form the 5th Air Support Command.

=== Operational Training Unit ===
The wing was again activated on 23 June 1942 at Wendover Field, Utah, replacing the inactivating 102nd Bombardment Wing (Provisional). The 16th Wing was responsible for the supervision and control of the operational training of heavy bombardment groups (Boeing B-17 Flying Fortress and Consolidated B-24 Liberator) during the second phase of their operational training. The 16th Wing inherited control from the 102nd Wing of Walla Walla Army Air Field, Ephrata Army Air Field and Geiger Field in Washington; Muroc Army Air Field in California as well as Wendover. The 16th Wing controlled the training of the following units, which on completion moved to the 17th Bombardment Wing for third phase training.

Jul 1942: 91st Bombardment Group, 303rd Bombardment Group, 305th Bombardment Group and 306th Bombardment Group.
Aug 1942: 96th Bombardment Group.
Aug-Sep 1942: 307th Bombardment Group and 302nd Bombardment Group.
Sep-Oct 1942: 88th Bombardment Group and 95th Bombardment Group.
Oct 1942: 2nd Bombardment Group, 99th Bombardment Group, 100th Bombardment Group, 304th Bombardment Group and 308th Bombardment Group.

Two groups, the 330th Bombardment Group at Alamogordo Army Air Field, New Mexico and the 331st Bombardment Group at Casper Army Air Field, Wyoming, provided second phase training to Replacement Combat Crews.

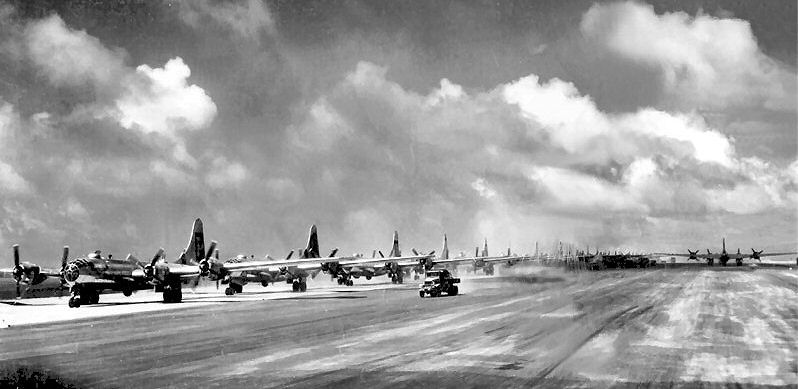
B-29s of the 39th Bombardment Group

On 2 November 1942, the Second Air Force reorganized its bombardment training. From that date its wings controlled new bombardment groups from their activation until completion of operational training. The wing also assumed responsibility for training replacement combat crews. With this reorganization the 16th Bombardment Training Wing now controlled Operational Training Units (OTUs) at Clovis Army Air Field, New Mexico, Davis-Monthan Field, Arizona; Kearney Army Air Field, Nebraska and Alamogordo Army Air Field, New Mexico. It also was assigned Replacement Control Centers (RCCs) at Pueblo Army Air Field, Colorado and Biggs Field, Texas. It was assigned the following OTU groups to conduct training:

39th Bombardment Group at Davis-Monthan Field, Tucson, Arizona: parent group, First Phase OTU.
302nd Bombardment Group at Pueblo AAB, Colorado: parent group, First Phase Training RCC.
330th Bombardment Group at Alamogordo AAFld, New Mexico: Second Phase OTU.
330th Bombardment Group at Biggs Field, El Paso, Texas: Second Phase RCC.
333d Bombardment Group at Topeka AAF, Kansas: Third Phase Training RCC.

The wing mission changed to very heavy bombardment group training (Boeing B-29 Superfortress), which lasted until operations ceased in late 1945. It moved to Colorado Springs, Colorado, where it was a paper unit until inactivating in 1946.

== Lineage ==
- Constituted as 16th Bombardment Wing on 19 October 1940

Activated on 18 December 1940
Inactivated on 1 September 1941

- Activated on 23 June 1942

Redesignated 16th Bombardment Training Wing in January 1943
Redesignated 16th Bombardment Operational Training Wing in April 1943
Redesignated 16th Bombardment Operational Training Wing, Very Heavy in May 1945

- Inactivated on 9 April 1946
- Disbanded on 8 October 1948
- Reconstituted on 31 July 1985 and redesignated 540th Combat Crew Training Wing (not active)

== Assignments ==
- First Air Force: 18 December 1940 – 1 September 1941
- Second Air Force: 23 June 1942 – 8 April 1946

== Stations ==
- Langley Field, Virginia, 18 December 1940
- Bowman Field, Kentucky, March 1941 – 1 September 1941
- Wendover Field, Utah, 23 June 1942
- Biggs Field, Texas, November 1942
- Davis-Monthan Field, Arizona, 1 June 1943
- Biggs Field, Texas, 12 October 1943
- Colorado Springs, Colorado, December 1945 – 9 April 1946

== Components ==
- 45th Bombardment Group: 15 January 1941 – 21 August 1941
- 46th Bombardment Group: 15 January 1941 – 1 September 1941
- See above for 1942–1944. After 1944 assigned various AAF Base Units.

== Commanders ==
- Brig. Gen. Junius W. Jones, c. Apr-c. 1 Sept. 1941
- Col. Ernest H. Lawson, 23 Jun 1942
- Brig. Gen. Robert B. Williams, 4 Apr 1943
- Col. Walter R. Agee, May 1943
- Brig. Gen. Newton Longfellow, 11 Oct 1943
- Col. Claude E. Duncan, c. 25 Nov 1945-unknown

=== Campaigns ===
Campaign Streamer	Campaign	Dates	Notes
	American Theater without inscription	23 June 1942 – 2 March 1946	
