= 330th Bombardment Group (VH) =

American military unit

- Active: 1942–1946
- Country: United States
- Branch: United States Army Air Corps
- Type: Bomber Group (Very Heavy)
- Nickname: "Empire Busters"
- Motto: Por La Libertad
- Colors: Blue, Gold
- Engagements: Strategic bombing of Japan
- Decorations: Distinguished Unit Citation with Oak Leaf Cluster

- Battle honours: : American Campaign Medal (1942–1945); Asiatic-Pacific Campaign Medal (1945)

Commanders
- June 1944 – August 1944: Col Elbert D. Reynolds
- August 1944-Unknown: Col Douglas C. Polhamus

Insignia
- Identification symbol: Square ' K '
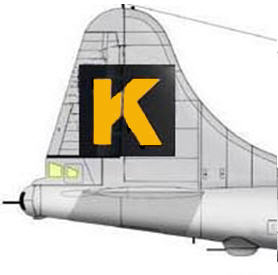
- Identification symbol

Aircraft flown
- Bomber: Boeing B-29 Superfortress
- Electronic warfare: Boeing B-29 'Porcupine' Superfortress

The 330th Bombardment Group ("Empire Busters") was a bomber group of the United States Army Air Forces during World War II. It was formed on 1 July 1942 at Salt Lake City Army Air Base, Utah. Initially, the group was equipped with the Consolidated B-24 Liberator, and served as a training unit within the United States until April 1944. On 1 April 1944, the group re-formed as a Boeing B-29 Superfortress-equipped unit as part of the 314th Bombardment Wing and trained for deployment to the Pacific Theater against Japan.

The group moved to North Field, Guam in 1945 as part of the Twentieth Air Force, flying its first combat mission on 12 April 1945. The Group received two Distinguished Unit Citations for incendiary raids on the homeland islands of Japan. The Group returned to the United States in late 1945, and was inactivated on 3 January 1946. Its lineage and honors were carried by the 330th Aircraft Sustainment Wing until it was permanently inactivated on 1 July 2010.

== Lineage and honors ==
Upon activation 6 July 1942, the 330th Bombardment Group (Heavy) was assigned to Second Air Force as a Consolidated B-24 Liberator Replacement Training Unit (RTU). The Group performed this training at Alamogordo Army Airfield in New Mexico, then later at Biggs Field near El Paso, Texas. On 1 April 1944, the Group was redesignated as the 330th Bombardment Group (Very Heavy), assigned to the Second Air Force and was designated as a Boeing B-29 Superfortress operational bomb group, being assigned to the 314th Bombardment Wing. The Group was assigned to Walker AAFB, Kansas, for equipping and training.

The Group began its deployment to North Field, Guam in early 1945, and was assigned to the XXI Bomber Command of the Twentieth Air Force. It entered combat on 12 April 1945 with an attack on Hodogaya-ku, Yokohama, Japan. The Group received two Distinguished Unit Citations for incendiary raids on the homeland islands of Japan. The 330th Bombardment Group returned to the United States during November and December 1945, and was inactivated on 3 January 1946.

On 27 June 1949, the unit was redesignated as the 330th Bombardment Group (Medium), activated and assigned to the United States Air Force Reserve. On 1 May 1951, the unit was ordered to active duty and its personnel transferred to Korea; and the unit (less personnel) was inactivated on 16 June 1951. On 14 June 1952 the unit was redesignated as the 330th Troop Carrier Group (Medium), but was inactivated on 14 July 1952.

The unit is credited with the American Theater, Air Offensive – Japan, and the Western Pacific campaigns.

== History ==
When activated in 1942, the Group functioned as an RTU, training B-24 crews in both New Mexico and Texas. In April 1944 on being designated as an operation bomber group, it was assigned to the 20th Air Force. The Group consisted of the 457th, 458th and the 459th Bomb Squadron; the 26th Photo Lab, activated in April 1944 at Walker Army Air Field, near Victoria, Kansas, also became part of the Group.

Two months later its cadres split, part of the Group remaining "on line" at Walker and part setting up manning headquarters at Dalhart, Texas. After a rapid filling up of both echelons, they were reunited at Walker AAF in August 1944. The newly assigned air crews joined them in late September and early October 1944. As a complete bomb group, they were ready for their brief period of intensive flight and ground training in slight B-29 Superfortresses. The Group's advanced ground echelon left Walker AAF by train on 7 January 1945 for the Fort Lawton Staging Area in Seattle, Washington. On 17 January 1945, they left on a 30-day journey on the Army transport Ship Howell Lykes en route to Guam. The air crews and the aircraft mechanics support technicians would not join them until mid-March.

== Guam 1945 ==
The Group's ground personnel arrived in the Port of Agana, Guam on 18 February 1945. The 854th Engineer Aviation Battalion was still busy putting the finishing touches on the parking aprons and taxiways for the 330th, which it had been working on since late November 1944. There were two other bomb groups of the 314th Wing just settling into North Field; the 19th Bomb Group and the 29th Bombardment Group had been there for several weeks. The 330th's area of the airfield was still mainly jungle. While the 845th continued work, the ground echelon along with the 502nd Engineering Squadron of the 89th Air Service Group (ASG) began the detailed work of making the airfield operational.

The air crews continued to commute between Walker Army Air Field and Batista (Cayuga) Field in Cuba, to sharpen their combat training. Once back in Kansas in early March, they picked up their new Boeing B-29 Superfortresses and headed to Guam via Mather Field, California, Hawaii and Kwajalein. The first 330th aircraft set down at North Field, Guam on 25 March 1945.

The 330th first flew against the Empire of Japan on 12 April 1945, before its last squadron arrived. Its forty-seventh and final bombing strike was in the air at the hour the Japanese surrender was announced on 15 August 1945. The result was a bomb group with the lowest overall abort rate on the ground, and the highest over-the-target rate of any bomb group in the entire 20th Air Force. The 330th BG flew 1,320 combat sorties, 18,978 combat hours and had dropped 7,039 short tons (6.386 kt) of high explosives and incendiary bombs on its targets.

== Aircraft ==
The sixty or so aircraft that made up the 330th were divided among three Bombardment Squadrons (BS):

- 457th Bombardment Squadron commanded by LtCol Lindsay H. Vereen
- 458th Bombardment Squadron commanded by Maj Elmer E. Ambrose
- 459th Bombardment Squadron commanded by LtCol Robert W. Ryder

On their vertical stabilizers they wore a 12-foot (4 m) square black box unit identification mark with a large capital letter K superimposed. This was to assist with identifying squadron aircraft out of a crowded sky to form up on during the daylight missions. In late summer the 'K' was infilled with a bright orange–yellow paint for better recognition. In late summer in 1945, it was ordered that all aircraft would have their undersides painted a glossy black. The intention was to mask them from enemy searchlights.

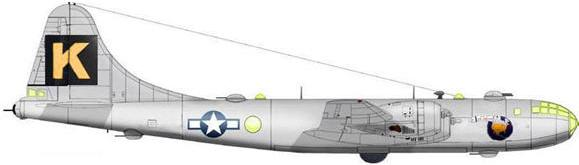

=== Nose art ===
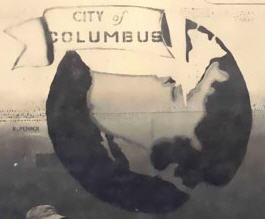

As it was part of the 314th Wing, the 330th used the "City of ..." style for naming its aircraft. This was a large 4 ft (1.2 m) diameter Navy Blue globe with a bright orange/yellow footprint of North America. Within this would be a thick white flagpole with a wavy white "City of..." flag attached depicting either the hometown of the Aircraft Commander or one of the crewmen whose name was drawn out of a hat. They were allowed to also have other nose art on the starboard side but "bloodthirsty" art was forbidden for fear that if the aircraft was shot down, subsequent Japanese propaganda would reinforce the belief that they were flown by "barbarians" and potentially harm future downed airmen. The marketing idea behind the “City of” logo would be to have the aircraft and her crew visit their named city after completing their requisite 30 missions. This Bond Tour of their city would be to raise funds for the continued war.

== Missions ==
The 330th Bomb Group (BG) arrived in the middle of an intensive bombing campaign by the Twentieth Air Force with the strategic objective of knocking the Japanese aircraft industry out of the war. To date, this campaign did not appear to be very successful since several major plants, such as the Nakajima Musashino Aircraft Plant north of Tokyo and the Mitsubishi Plant near Nagoya, seemed to be little damaged as a result of persistent daylight precision raids by B-29s flying in formation. A major reason was the weather which hindered both assembling in formation at a remote point and then flying to the target, which might be covered in clouds or haze making visual bombing difficult or impossible.

On a typical daylight mission, aircraft flew individually, one minute apart, from Guam to a predesignated "rallying" point about 100 miles (160 km) off the coast of Japan. There, they would form up on a "lead" aircraft and proceed in smaller formations of 10 aircraft or so over the target. They would then drop when they witnessed the "lead" aircraft drop, then return individually to Guam. The aircraft flew thousands of miles for 12 or more hours, and had to conserve as much fuel as possible in order to make it back to base or to Iwo Jima. Flying individually gave the pilots the ability to allow for particular conditions.

On a daylight mission, squadron visibility was the key to a successful mission – the reason for the large tail letters and individual aircraft numbers on fuselages. For some missions, it was imperative that the aircraft commander (AC) found his designated squadron and proceeded over the target at the briefed time, the briefed altitude, and hit his target. If he could not find his particular formation, he would join another group and bomb their target.

On a typical night mission, several 'Pathfinder' B-29s took off first. The rest of the squadron's aircraft took off 10–15 minutes later. Instead of 'rallying' off the coast of Japan, each aircraft would have its own pre-assigned altitude and heading over the target. Minutes before the rest of the squadron was due over the target, the 'Pathfinders' would drop incendiaries, marking it for the rest to drop on.

Whether on a daylight or nighttime mission, if the primary target was obscured, the bombers would either drop by radar or attempt to bomb a predesignated secondary target.

=== April 1945 ===
==== Mission: 1 ====
- Date: 12 April 1945
- Target: Hodogaya (Yokohama) Chemical Plant
- Bomber Command Mission: 65
- Code Name: Lunchroom # 1

Twenty B-29s were scheduled to participate in this mission with each carrying eight 500 pounds (230 kg) general-purpose bombs of Composition B high explosive. The B-29s took off in the early morning hours of 12 April. One B-29 was late in taking off, never made it to the assembly point in time and later dropped its bombs on a target of opportunity (TO). Two others aborted. Two formations were formed from the remaining 17 B-29s, consisting of 12 aircraft and 5 aircraft. The larger formation, at an altitude of up to 8,000 feet (2,400 m), was off the briefed heading on its bomb run and had to make a second run with visibility at 8 miles (13 km) in haze. The smaller formation attacked the plant on a different heading. Japanese flak was described as meager and inaccurate and there was absolutely no fighter opposition. Thirteen aircraft landed back at Guam late that evening while three were diverted and landed safely at Harmon Airfield.

Bomb results were excellent; all the main buildings in the 330th's target area were damaged or destroyed, comprising 73% of the target roof area. Losses were two aircraft. One ditched in the ocean with the loss of four crew; and the other crashed and caught fire on landing at Agana after suffering damage trying to land at North Field on instruments, only one crewman surviving. As a result, a second beacon was added at North Field to guide aircraft in instrument landings.

==== Mission: 2 ====
- Date: 13–14 April 1945
- Target: Tokyo Artificial Chemical Fertilizer Plant
- Bomber Command Mission: 67
- Code Name: Perdition # 1

This mission, classified as a precision night mission, was a three-wing effort by the 73rd, 313th and 314th Bomb Wings (BWs) using combination loads of HE and incendiary bombs. The 330th BG contributed 16 aircraft that deposited 47.5 tons on or near its aiming point (AP) described as the Tokyo Artificial Chemical Fertilizer Plant. The reported burned out area was estimated as 10.5 sq mi (27 km^{2}). Antiaircraft fire was intense and a B-29 from the 458th Bomb Squadron was one of seven lost during the mission. It was hit over Tokyo and went down in Tokyo Bay.

==== Mission: 3 ====
- Date: 15–16 April 1945
- Target: Kawasaki, Kanagawa
- Bomber Command Mission: 68
- Code Name: Brisket # 1

Twenty B-29s from the 330th BG were part of a larger effort by the 73rd, 313th and 314th BWs against the southern Tokyo suburb of Kawasaki, between Tokyo and Yokohama. The Group deposited 95.2 tons on the target. Photo analysis indicated that approximately 8 sq mi (21 km^{2}) of Tokyo was burned out that night. It was a clear night in the area and the searchlights, enemy flak and fighters were particularly effective, resulting in a loss of 13 aircraft, although none were from the 330th BG.

==== Mission: 4 ====
- Date: 17 April
- Target: Kanoya Airdrome
- Bomber Command Mission: 74
- Code Name: Checkbook # 1

All but one of the remaining missions by the 330th BG in April were against airfields on Kyūshū. This was part of the XXI Bomber Command anti-Kamikaze campaign requested by Admiral Chester Nimitz. Starting with the Philippine Campaign, the Japanese Navy utilized Kamikaze tactics against American warships and carriers.

The 330th BG played an important role in the campaign. Six of the Group's nine Kyūshū airfield raids were against the Kanoya Airdrome complex and code named 'Checkbook'. Kanoya airfield was the headquarters of Admiral Matome Ugaki who skillfully directed the Kamikaze campaign from this base. Checkbook #1 took place on 17 April 1945 against the Kanoya Airdrome by 11 B-29s, which dropped 16.27 tons of HE on the complex. The aiming point (AP) for the Group was a row of buildings on the SW corner of the base. Crew reports stated hangar buildings at the base were hit and burning and, in general, bomb results were reported as good to excellent.

==== Mission: 5 ====
- Date: 18 April
- Target: Kanoya Airdrome
- Bomber Command Mission: 78
- Code Name: Checkbook # 2

The 330th BG bombed the Kanoya Airdrome again the following day. This time 11 aircraft took off, with one aborting. The remaining ten B-29s proceeded in formation to Kanoya where they dropped 26.80 tons of bombs. Fighter opposition was reported as nil and flak meager and inaccurate.

==== Mission: 6 ====
- Date: 21 April
- Target: Kagoshima Airdrome
- Bomber Command Mission: 87
- Code Name: Aeroscope # 1

Next the 330th BG was assigned to attack the Kushira Naval Air Base and 11 aircraft were dedicated to the mission. The 330th BG was joined by other BGs from the 314th Bombardment Wing. Results from crew reports ranged from unobserved to excellent. In all 40.25 tons of general purpose HE bombs were deposited on this airfield without loss.

==== Mission: 7 ====
- Date: 22 April
- Target: Kanoya Airdrome
- Bomber Command Mission: 93
- Code Name: Checkbook # 4

The 330th BG supplied 11 aircraft to a composite group to attack the Kanoya Airdrome complex, one of nine Japanese air bases attacked that day. The 11 B-29s deposited 48.2 tons of bombs on the target with crews reporting unobserved to excellent results. All aircraft returned safely.

==== Mission: 8 ====
- Date: 24 April
- Target: Hitachi Aircraft Plant
- Bomber Command Mission: 96
- Code name: Cat Call # 1

This was the second daylight precision bombing raid against a strategic target by the 330th BG. The target was the Hitachi aircraft factory located at Tachikawa (a suburb west of Tokyo). Ten 330th BG aircraft deposited 46.5 tons of bombs on the target with results described as poor. Anti-aircraft fire was reported as generally moderate to intense and accurate. This was confirmed by the six aircraft receiving minor flak damage. Eight Japanese fighters were sighted and two attacked the formation. One B-29 was lost, seen to ditch off the Japanese coast; sinking in about four minutes. Three crewmen survived the war as POWs.

==== Mission: 9 ====
- Date: 26 April
- Target: Miyakonojo Airfield
- Bomber Command Mission: 107
- Code Name: Dripper # 1

This raid was planned as a precision daylight raid on the Miyakonojo airfield on southern Kyūshū, but encountered poor weather. Twenty B-29s took off but couldn't assemble, instead proceeding individually and dropping their bombs by radar. Two aircraft bombed the primary target, 15 bombed the secondary target, Miyazaki Prefecture airfield, and three dropped bombs on targets of opportunity. No enemy aircraft were encountered and only one crew reported flak. All aircraft returned safely.

==== Mission: 10 ====
- Date: 27 April
- Target: Kanoya Aerodrome
- Bomber Command Mission: 112
- Code Name: Checkbook # 7

The 330th BG contributed ten aircraft to a composite bomb group of the 314th BW to bomb Kanoya Airdrome. The ten B-29s dropped a total of 49.25 tons. Bombing results were described as good to excellent. All aircraft returned safely.

==== Mission: 11 ====
- Date: 28 April
- Target: Kanoya Aerodrome
- Bomber Command Mission: 118
- Code Name: Checkbook # 8

The 330th BG contributed twelve aircraft from one squadron to another squadron from the 19th BG to form a composite group to attack Kanoya Airdrome again. One aircraft aborted due to mechanical failure. Another joined the wrong squadron and bombed Miyakonojō Airfield instead. The ten remaining B-29s dropped a total of 49.25 tons on the target, with reportedly excellent results. There were no casualties and no aircraft lost.

==== Mission: 12 ====
- Date: 29 April
- Target: Kanoya Aerodrome
- Bomber Command Mission: 124
- Code Name: Checkbook # 9

Thirteen aircraft were scheduled for Kanoya this day but four failed to take off due to mechanical problems. The Group's bombs landed 1,200 feet (370 m) from the briefed AP with fair results.

==== Mission: 13 ====
- Date: 30 April
- Target:/ Tomitaka Airfield
- Bomber Command Mission: 131
- Code Name: Skewer # 3

The target was Tomitaka airfield on the East coast of Kyūshū. Twelve aircraft took off, but one aborted due to engine trouble. Reported results were good to excellent. There were no losses or enemy opposition.

=== May 1945 ===
==== Mission: 14 ====
- Date: 4 May
- Target: Matsuyama Naval Air Station on Shikoku
- Bomber Command Mission: 143
- Code Name: Mopish # 2

Continuing with the anti-Kamikaze campaign, the 457th BS contributed nine aircraft and the 458th BS contributed ten; to a strike against the Matsuyama Naval Air Station. The anti-aircraft fire was weak but 18 enemy fighters attacked the formations, resulting in four enemy aircraft damaged. The bombing results ranged from poor to excellent. There were no casualties among the B-29 crews.

==== Mission: 15 ====
- Date: 5 May
- Target: Ōmura Naval Air Station, Nagasaki, Kyūshū
- Bomber Command Mission: 141
- Code Name: Vamoose # 1

Eleven aircraft attacked Ōmura Naval Air Station. A Kawasaki Ki-61 Hien dropped a phosphorus bomb in the formation, which came under about six fighter attacks in all. The 314th BW summary states that the Ōmura formation had ten enemy attacks with one enemy aircraft destroyed by the 459th BS gunners. Flak was heavy caliber, meagre and 90% inaccurate. All aircraft returned to base unharmed.

==== Mission: 16 ====
- Date: 10 May
- Target: Ōtake Oil Refinery
- Bomber Command Mission #165
- Code Name: Fainter # 1

In this raid 112 aircraft attacked the Ōtake Oil Refinery on Honshu in a precision daylight bombing raid in formation, including 33 from the 330th BG. The 457th BS contributed twelve B-29s; the 458th BS contributed twelve and the 459th BS contributed nine. It was estimated that 45% of the refinery unit and finished product storage areas were destroyed and the plant was probably put out of operation. Opposition was stiff. Enemy fighters made 54 attacks, damaging five B-29s. On the briefed route, anti-aircraft fire was heavy caliber but meager and inaccurate, but a few formations received intense naval fire while leaving the target. Twenty-three B-29s suffered flak damage.

==== Mission: 17 ====
- Date: 11 May
- Target: Kawanishi Aircraft Plant
- Bomber Command Mission: 172
- Code Name: Leafstalk # 1

This raid against the Kawanishi Aircraft Plant, near Kobe was a three-Wing effort. The 314th BW contributed 40 aircraft, of which 11 were from the 330th BG, these depositing 50 tons of bombs. The BW Report states that 39% of the plant was damaged or destroyed and collateral damage was received by adjoining Merchant Marine College, residential and manufacturing areas. No aircraft were lost.

==== Mission: 18 ====
- Date: 14 May
- Target: North Nagoya Urgan Area
- Bomber Command Mission: 174
- Code Name: Microscope # 4

The 14 May strike was a daylight-bombing mission against Nagoya in formation, with the 330th BG contributing 32 of the 135 aircraft from the 314th BW that hit the city. The 330th dropped 152.4 tons of bombs.

==== Mission: 19 ====
- Date: 16–17 May
- Target: South Nagoya Urban Area
- Bomber Command Mission: 176
- Code Name: Microscope # 5

In this night raid, the 330th BG had 32 B-29s dropping 176.95 tons of bombs on the South Nagoya Urban area. The damage to Nagoya from Missions # 174 and 176 were 6.97 square miles (18 km^{2}) or 13.7% of the city's built up area. Damage ranging from slight to complete destruction was inflicted on 29 numbered industrial targets and 7 unnumbered industrial targets.

==== Mission: 20 ====
- Date: 19 May
- Target: Tokyo Industrial Targets
- Bomber Command Mission: 178

This was to be a precision daylight-bombing raid in formation, with the 330th BG contributing 22 aircraft, to attack industrial targets in the Tokyo area. Due to poor weather the bombs were dropped on the primary radar target, the city of Hamamatsu, instead. It was reported that the four-Wing effort damaged 0.22 square miles (0.57 km^{2}), 5% of the city. One industrial target was 20% destroyed.

==== Mission: 21 ====
- Date: 23–24 May
- Target: Tokyo South Urban Area
- Bomber Command Mission: 181

Taking off at 23/2000G, 35 aircraft from the 330th BG attacked the heavily defended Tokyo South Urban Area. The 330th BG was part of a combined four-Wing attack on the city. One aircraft was reported missing.

==== Mission: 22 ====
- Date: 25–26 May
- Target: South Central Tokyo
- Bomber Command Mission: 183

In the last major strike of the war against Tokyo, the 330th BG contributed 24 bombers and 106.8 tons of incendiary bombs. The south central Tokyo area was the focus of the attack, which included the Imperial Palace. Crews had explicit orders not to bomb Hirohito' s residence, but some bombs fell within the Tokyo Imperial Palace grounds. Total area damaged as a result of BC Missions 181 and 183 was 22.1 square miles (57 km^{2}). Most of the bombs fell south and west of the Imperial Palace. Numerous buildings within the Palace grounds were destroyed as well as areas adjacent to the Palace. A minimum of 31 numbered industrial targets were damaged or destroyed. The total city area damaged as a result of all incendiary raids was 56.3 square miles (150 km^{2}) or 50.8% of the city's built up area.

==== Mission: 23 ====
- Date: 29 May
- Target: Yokohama Urban Area
- Bomber Command Mission: 186

Closing out the month of May, the 330th BG contributed 38 aircraft to a daylight raid against the Yokohama urban area. They dropped 203 tons of bombs on the target out of a total of 621 tons of bombs dropped by the 131 aircraft on the raid.

=== June ===
==== Mission: 24 ====
- Date: 1 June
- Target: West Osaka Urban Area
- Bomber Command Mission: 187

The BG contributed 37 aircraft that dropped 150 tons of incendiaries and 6.4 tons of fragmentation bombs on the Osaka urban area. Keyes identified the target euphemistically as "Home Industries". It was believed at the time that many of the major industrial plants were supplied by factories in homes. This was found to be untrue after the war; actually many small feeder factories were intermingled in residential districts. The Group was part of a 457 effort by the XXI Bomber Command in its continuing campaign to knock out the major Japanese industrial cities. Keyes states that they took off at 02:40 (military time zone G) and assembled in loose formation at Iwo Jima and proceeded through soupy weather to the empire. They climbed to 20,600 ft (6,300 m) where they reassembled. Proceeding to the IP, they saw flak ahead and many fighters, some in pairs, which they presumed to be North American P-51 Mustangs. Many Japanese fighters; Nakajima J1N, A6M Zero, and Nakajima Ki-44 'Tojo', attacked their formation, and one attacked their plane from 12 o'clock and came within 25 yards of them before going over it. Bombs were dropped at 12:54 and more flak was seen on the way out; Keyes states that it was the most flak he had seen to date. The BG recorded a total enemy fighter toll of 16 down, 9 probable and 24 damaged by B-29 and P-51 fighters (some of these were not verified in post war analysis of Japanese records). The aircraft landed at North Field at about 17:40.

The mission was "Black Friday" for the 20th Air Force with 24 P-15 Mustangs lost. The P-51s used B-29s to guide them over the long overwater flights. Upon entering an unpredicted very large severe weatherfront the fighters lost contact with the B-29 and they had to ditch when they ran out of fuel.

==== Mission: 25 ====
- Date: 5 June
- Target: Kobe Urban Area
- Bomber Command Mission: 188

Continuing the strategic fire raids against major Japanese cities, the BG contributed 31 planes to a 473-plane armada against Kobe. The BG planes deposited 170.1 tons total, of which 5.6 tons were fragmentation bombs to keep the fire fighters away from the 164.5 tons incendiary bombs deposited. This was a daylight raid with take off between 5/0100G -5/0140G. Planes proceeded to the Japanese mainland at about 10,000 feet (3,000 m) and, in the case of Keyes, arrived early and circled for 30 minutes before finding their formation. The formation proceeded to the IP climbing to 16,500 feet (5,000 m). The target was the rail center and bombs were away at 5/0930G. Passing over the city, the formation encountered fairly accurate flak and passed to the left of a large smoke column rising up to 21,000 feet (6,400 m). It was a costly mission for the XXI BC which lost 11 planes, 2.3% of the attacking force. The 330th BG lost one aircraft and all the crew were listed missing in action.

==== Mission: 26 ====
- Date: 7 June
- Target: Osaka Urban Area
- Bomber Command Mission: 189

Not giving Osaka a chance to recover, the 330th BG contributed 27 planes to a 409-plane armada that struck Osaka again in a daylight raid. According to Keyes, they left Guam at 7/0450G and proceeded to Minami Iwo Jima and assembled into formation at 6,000 feet (1,800 m) in clear weather. After the clobbering that some formations took from Japanese fighters on 5 June 1945, Keyes was happy to see a flight of 46 P-51s escorting the formation to the Empire that day. The 330th BG planes deposited 152.38 tons of incendiary bombs and 0.8 tons fragmentation bombs on Osaka from approximately 20,700 feet (6,300 m) at 7/1258G. It was 10/10 cloud cover and bombs were dropped by radar. Flak was coming up close to the formation as well, so the Japanese were using radar to fire their anti-aircraft guns. In addition, crews were dumping much chaff to deceive Japanese RADAR. This was effective since no planes were lost from the BG and only two planes (0.5%) were lost from the entire armada. Aircraft landed at North Field between 7/2000G to 7/2100G.

==== Mission: 27 ====
- Date: 10 June
- Target: Kasumigaura Naval Sea Plane Station
- Bomber Command Mission: 195

This was a precision daylight raid on the Kasumigaura Naval Seaplane base 50 miles (80 km) northeast of Tokyo. Thirty-two airplanes were airborne at 10/0100G and returned at 10/1600G. Two planes aborted and 26 planes bombed the primary target and four planes bombed the secondary target, the city of Gifu. The Group deposited 143.75 tons of high explosive on the seaplane base. The presumed reason for this strike was to neutralize the base's capability of launching reconnaissance seaplanes to monitor the movements of the U.S. Third Fleet. This was Adm. Halsey's mobile naval task force and he was preparing a major sortie against the Empire starting on 1 July 1945. The 330th BG did not lose any aircraft although a number of crewman were injured.

==== Mission: 28 ====
- Date: 15 June
- Target: Osaka Amagasaki Urban Area
- Bomber Command Mission: 203

As part of a large armada of 494 B-29s from the XXI BC that attacked the Amagasaki urban area northwest of Osaka, the 330th BG contributed 26 planes to the raid. The planes departed at 15/0230G and landed at 15/1800G. One plane from the 330th BG hit a secondary target and six planes aborted. The bomb load was as follows: 88.75 tons from the 457th BS, 65.5 tons from the 458th BS and 48.0 tons from the 459th BS. The average bomb load for each squadron was as follows: 457th: 7.4 tons per AC; 458th: 9.4 tons per AC; 459th: 6.9 tons per AC. The surprise in these figures is the heavy bomb load per AC carried by the 458th BS. There were 33 planes hitting the primary. This fire raid was the last of the major raids that laid waste to the industrial heartland of Japan and certainly must have convinced any doubters among the Japanese military that Japan's days as a military power were rapidly diminishing. Despite the heavy bomb loads, no Group aircraft were lost. Osaka, as a result of these fire raids, as well as the strangulation on their food and raw materials caused by aerial mining, ceased to function as a viable city by the end of July 1945.

==== Mission: 29 ====
- Date: 17–18 June
- Target: Kagoshima Urban Area
- Bomber Command Mission: 206

This was the first in a series of night fire raids against minor Japanese cities (cities with a population of less than 300,000 persons). At this juncture in the bombing campaign against Japan, the XXI BC had four Bomb Wings to draw upon but attacking the urban areas of minor Japanese cities normally required only one BW to do the job. Therefore, on attack night, each BW was assigned a separate Japanese city. On this date, the 330th BG joined the three other BGs of the 314th BW to attack the city of Kagoshima on the south coast of Kyūshū with a population of 182,000. The BG deposited 203 tons of IE and the average tons per aircraft were as follows: 457th Squadron 7.4 tons per AC, the 458th Squadron 9.2 tons per AC and the 459th Squadron 7.3 tons per AC These average masked large individual plane differences. Planes departed at about 17/1700G and returned at 18/0800G. These night missions typically lasted 14 to 15 hours. In this case, later photo analysis of damage to Kagoshima indicated that approximately 44% of the built-up area was burned out. Keyes indicated that on this night mission the AP was military installations and staging areas. The night was clear over the target for K-58 with bombs away at 18/0033G from 8,100 feet (2,500 m). The 314th BW History states that 74 planes bombed by radar, 8 visually and 21 by radar with visual correction. There were no planes lost and no casualties from the 330th BG.

==== Mission: 30 ====
- Date: 19–20 June
- Target: Shizuoka Urban Area
- Bomber Command Mission: 212

Continuing the offensive against the minor Japanese cities, the 314th BW attacked the city of Shizuoka, located on the coast on the main rail line between Tokyo and Nagoya. It was presumably an easy target to identify by radar. The 330th BG contributed 33 planes and with three aborts 30 planes deposited 189.22 tons of incendiary bombs on the city. The tons per AC by Bomb Squadron were as follows: 457th: 5.8 per AC; 458th: 7.1 tons per AC and 459th: 6.2 per AC. They were aloft at 19/2030G and climbed to 7,000 feet (2,100 m) up past Iwo Jima and then up to 9,500 feet (2,900 m) over the city at a speed of 250 mph (CAS). Bombs were away at 20/0314G. They experienced little flak over the target but they received flak from naval ships in Suruga Bay where a major port is located. There was smoke up to 15,000 feet (4,600 m) but a stiff breeze was blowing it away from the city. Of the 123 planes hitting the target from the 314th BW, 54 planes bombed visually. 31 planes bombed by radar with visual correction and 37 planes bombed by radar; 1 plane could not see the target but could see the offset reference point. It was estimated that 66% of the city's built up area was consumed in the fire started by the incendiary bombs. The raid effectiveness factor was 0.0026 square miles (6,700 m^{2}) per ton. Two planes from the 314th BW were lost but none from the 330th BG. The elapsed time of this mission was 13 hours, a short mission relative to some of the daylight missions.

==== Mission: 31 ====
- Date: 22 June
- Target: Mitsubishi Aircraft Plant, Tamashima, Kyūshū
- Bomber Command Mission: 216

On this mission, the BG went back to precision daylight bombing in formation against the Japanese aircraft industry. The 330th BG sent 33 planes aloft, four of which aborted. The 29 planes assembled in formation and attacked the Mitsubishi aircraft plant at Tamashima, which produced. the Mitsubishi G4M 'Betty' aircraft. The BG deposited 174 tons of high explosive, with aircraft loads as follows: 457th: 4.9 tons per AC; 458th: 6.4 tons per AC and 459th 6.7 tons per AC. Planes were aloft at 22/0200G and returned at 22/1'715G. The 330th BG lost one aircraft will all the crew but one killed in action.

==== Mission: 32 ====
- Date: 26 June
- Target: Sumitomo Dural Aluminium Plant, Nagoya
- Bomber Command Mission: 230

Another clear day was predicted over Honshū and a number of strategic targets that could, only be attacked in daylight were chosen for attack by the XXI BC. The 330th BG attacked the Sumitomo Duralumin Plant near Nagoya. Other BGs of the 314th BW attacked other industrial plants in the Nagoya area. The Sumitomo plant produced duralumin, the hard aluminium alloy used in airframe construction. The 33 planes took off from North Field at 26/0200G and landed at 26/1800G. Two planes aborted. two planes hit secondary targets and the remaining 29 planes dropped 155.5 tons of high explosive on the plant. The tons per aircraft were: 457th: 6.7 per AC; 458th.1: 3.5 per Aircraft and 459th: 5.6 per Aircraft. The planes were over the target at 26/1020G at 22.300 feet (6.797 m). But, whatever the weather predictions, the weather at the target was otherwise. Weather in the assembly area made assembly difficult.

==== Mission: 33 ====
- Date: 28–29 June
- Target: Nobeoka Urban Area
- Bomber Command Mission: 237

Continuing with the night attacks against minor Japanese cities, the 330th BG contributed 246.6 tons of incendiary bombs on Nobeoka, a relatively small city on the east coast of Kyūshū and on the main rail line running along the east coast of the island. This seemingly insignificant raid was in fact the start of an intensive bombing campaign of cities and the railroad system on this coast since it was directly in the path of the projected invasion of Kyūshū by Gen. Douglas MacArthur on 1 November 1945. The 32 planes were airborne from North Field, Guam at 28/2000G and landed at 29/1100G with bomb loads per AC as follows: 457th: 6.1 tons per AC; 458th 8.9 tons per Ac and 459th: 8.4 tons per Ac. One notes the dramatic increase in bomb loads permitted by these night incendiary raids compared to the early daylight raids over Tokyo at 30,000 feet (9,100 m) with planes averaging 2 to 3 tons per AC. The consensus of the crews was that this was a good mission. The target area was burning well. Scattered fires were seen with smoke rising to 14,000 feet (4,300 m). But, later crews started their bomb run in clouds and smoke.

=== July ===
==== Mission: 34 ====
- Date: 1–2 July
- Target: Shimonoseki Urban Area
- Bomber Command Mission: 243

The city of Shimonoseki, population 196,000, was the target of this night raid. Thirty-eight aircraft took off with one aborting. The BG deposited 180.5 tons of incendiary bombs; part of the overall load of 833 tons dropped by four groups, burning out an estimated 36% of the built up area. One B-29 dubbed "Porcupine" was using radar countermeasures for 90 minutes jamming Japanese radar. Despite the heavy concentration of anti-aircraft guns in and around Shimonseki, all aircraft returned safely.

==== Mission: 35 ====
- Date: 3–4 July
- Target: Tokushima Urban Area
- Bomber Command Mission: 250

On this mission, the Bomb Group deposited 328.5 tons; another reference gives 314.9 tons of incendiary bombs (IB) on Tokushima, a railroad hub on the eastern shore of Shikoku Island, the smallest island of the four Japanese home islands. The bomb loads were the highest of the war to date with the 457th: 10; 458th: 9.8; and 459th: 10 tons per AC. The total 314th BW deposited 1,051 tons of bombs, burning out an estimated 1.7 square miles (4.4 km^{2}) of the town. This was 74% of the total built up area of the town for a bombing efficiency factor of 0.0016 square miles (4,100 m^{2}) per ton. Take off time on this mission was 3/1900G and the planes returned at about 4/1100G.

There were no planes lost or casualties.

==== Mission: 36 ====
- Date: 6–7 July
- Target: Kōfu Urban Area
- Bomber Command Mission: 254

The 314th BW attacked the city of Kōfu, an inland city west of Tokyo. Bombing through cloud cover, the 330th BG contributed 33 aircraft with one aborting. The BW deposited a total of 970 tons of incendiary bombs, burning down 64% or 1.3 square miles (3.4 km^{2}) of the town with an effectiveness factor of 0.0013 square miles (3,400 m^{2}) per ton. The 330th BG flew as BW lead and received the Distinguished Unit Citation for this mission. The citation stated: " This source of power was permanently eliminated as a target and 2/3 of its industrial region was leveled in this magnificent demonstration of determination and bombing skill".

==== Mission: 37 ====
- Date: 9–10 July
- Target: Gifu, Gifu Urban Area
- Bomber Command Mission: 260

The 330th BG contributed 243.4 tons of incendiary bombs, all E-46 cluster bombs, to the 899 tons of incendiary bombs deposited by the 314th BW this night on Gifu. Thirty-four planes were aloft with three aborts and the average bomb loads were distributed as follows: 457th: 7.8; 458th: 7.8; and 459th: 8.0 tons per AC. The planes left at about 9/1700G and returned at approximately 10/0800G with bombs away between 10/0117G and the last at 10/0200G at an altitude of 14.000 -16.000 feet resulting in the bombs for the 31 planes being dropped in 43 minutes. This equates to an average time interval of 1.4 minutes between planes. This interval is important in determining the overall effectiveness of a fire raid. Later analysis indicated that 1.4 square miles (3.6 km^{2}) (74%) of the city were burned out. The bombing efficiency factor was 0.0016 square miles (4,100 m^{2}) per ton. There was only meager, inaccurate, heavy caliber anti-aircraft fire (15,000–25,000 feet), but inaccurate and intense automatic weapon fire (2,000–5,000), which was ineffective at the bombing altitude. Again, the estimated and actual fuel consumption was very close. The calculated value was 5,922 US gallons (22,400 L) and the actual average used was 5,987 US gallons (22,700 L). There were no planes lost or casualties.

==== Mission: 38 ====
- Date: 12–13 July
- Target: Uwajima, Ehime Urban Area
- Bomber Command Mission: 266

This mission was planned as a night mission against a relatively small city, Uwajima, of 50,000 population on the west coast of Shikoku. Thirty-three planes from the 330th BG took off at 12/1700G and landed about 13/0800G. Weather was the determining factor in the poor results of this mission. There was a weather front which was 100 miles (160 km) north of the predicted position and close to the target, so crews flew at 14,000 -17,000 feet in the soup on instruments for 55 minutes from the front to the target and back to the edge of the front. The lower cumulus clouds over the target confused the radar pictures making identification of the target difficult. Bombs were scattered all over the countryside as only 0.14 square miles (0.36 km^{2}) (16%) of the target area was burned as a result of the 873 tons of incendiary bombs dropped by the 314th BW on this target. The efficiency factor for this mission was 0.00016 square miles (410 m^{2}) per ton. The target had to be revisited at the end of July to complete the job. Radio discipline was good as no one broke radio silence in the 330th BG, but three planes in the other BGs did break radio silence. Cruise control worked out very well with the calculated average fuel consumption of 5,908 US gallons (22,400 L) comparing favorably with the actual fuel consumption of 5,879 US gallons (22,300 L). One plane had 22 of its 187 M-47 incendiary bombs hang up in the bomb bay and they were dropped on Rota (island) before landing. There were no planes lost or casualties.

==== Mission: 39 ====
- Date: 16–17 July
- Target: Hiratsuka Urban Area
- Bomber Command Mission: 274

The target for this night's mission was Hiratsuka, a relatively small town south of Tokyo with an estimated population of 53,000, on the main railroad line linking Tokyo and Nagoya. Bombing by radar through complete cloud, the BG dropped 335.75 tons; and the 314th BW dropped a total of 1,163 tons of bombs on the city. This resulted in about 1 square mile (3 km^{2}), or 41.9% of the city destroyed for an efficiency factor of 0.00086 square miles (2,200 m^{2}) per ton. Later, crews reported a glow in the clouds with smoke mushrooming up to 12,000 feet (3,700 m) and explosions in the target area. All aircraft returned safely.

==== Mission: 40 ====
- Date: 19–20 July
- Target: Okazaki, Aichi Urban Area
- Bomber Command Mission: 280

The 330th BG, with 31 planes, teamed up with the 19th and 29th BGs to attack Okazaki: a town lying 20 miles (30 km) to the southeast of Nagoya. The 330th BG planes were loaded with 184 M-47 IB's, each weighing about 100 lbs for a total bomb Ioad of 196.2 tons. The other BGs used M-17 and E-46 incendiary devices. The total incendiary bomb load dropped on the town was 850 tons, burning down 0.65 square miles (1.7 km^{2}) or 68% of the total built-up area for an effectiveness factor of 0.00076 square miles (2,000 m^{2}) per ton. There were scattered clouds above the target above 17,000 feet (5,200 m). This permitted nine planes to bomb visually and 22 by synchronous radar from 14,200 to 15,400 feet (4,700 m). Bombs were away between 20/0152G to 20/0234G. All aircraft were back at North Field at about 20/0830G. Crews reporting on the bombing results indicated that the bombs dropped in the target area causing fires and one reported a large explosion lighting up a city block. One crew reported five trains of bombs burning in the river. Another crew saw a string of bombs north of the course near Koromo. While radio discipline appeared to be good overall, communication with the weather ship on the VHF channel appeared to leave room for improvement. Only four sightings were made of enemy aircraft and no heavy anti-aircraft fire was experienced and meager, inaccurate automatic weapon fire at lower altitude was observed. But with three BGs, totaling 94 aircraft, in the area and apparently scheduled fairly close together, mistakes were made. The 330th BG lost one aircraft.

==== Mission: 41 ====
- Date: 24 July
- Target: Nakajima Aircraft Plant
- Bomber Command Mission: 290

This was the only daylight precision bombing mission in formation by the 330th BG during July. The primary visual target was the Nakajima aircraft plant near Nagoya. When the formation got there it was cloud covered. The formation then traveled to the secondary visual target and it was cloud covered as well. The formations then proceeded to the city of Tsu, Mie, about 38 miles (61 km) southwest of Nagoya, the primary radar target. This mission had what the Royal Air Force called a "Master of Ceremonies" when one aircraft took off before the others and was over the various targets to direct traffic. Despite flying to three targets in formation, all aircraft returned safely.

==== Mission: 42 ====
- Date: 26–27 July
- Target: Ōmuta Urban Area
- Bomber Command Mission: 295

As with most night missions during July, there were scattered clouds from the base up to 6,000 to 8,000 feet (2,400 m) and a clear sky with visibility up to 10 miles (16 km) between 8,000 and 17,000 feet (5,200 m), and clouds above that altitude. Ōmuta was a major town on the west side of Kyūshū. The 58th BW attacked it on 17–18 June 1945 with only minor damage. It had a population of 177,000 and was the focus of the 314th BW's efforts with all four bomb groups participating this night. The 330th BG had 33 planes scheduled with 11 from each Bomb Squadron. Two aircraft aborted the mission and the remaining 31 planes dropped 252.84 tons of M-47 and M-17 incendiary bombs on Omuta from 14,000 to 15,500 feet (4,700 m). Altogether, the four BGs dropped 965 tons of IB on the town, burning 2.65 square miles (6.9 km^{2}) or 46.6% of the total built up area. The efficiency factor was 0.0027 square miles (7,000 m^{2}) per ton. Despite the complaint about the weather, it was an efficient bombing strike. Its strategic value lay in the fact that Omuta was a rail hub and a port on the western side of Kyūshū and would need to be isolated before the Kyūshū invasion. The raid was planned as a classic night area-bombing mission with Pathfinder planes. This concept works only if the Pathfinders correctly mark the town and the follow-on aircraft can see the marker bombs. Otherwise, the crews were on their own. There were six Pathfinder Planes over the target between 27/0113G and the last 27/0133G and the main force was over the target from 17/0133 – 27/0201G. On many past missions, there were complaints that the weather planes provided weather information that was outdated by the time the planes reached the target. In this case the reverse was true when one Pathfinder was on its bomb run when the wind data came in. The Nav's complained that the forecasted wind directions and actual wind directions between Iwo Jima and the target were off by 90 to 100 degrees. These late and inaccurate weather reports may be the reason that one of the 457th BS Patfinder aircraft almost had its wing torn off by bombs falling on it from an aircraft 200 feet (61 m) overhead.

The Japanese were aware that this was an important target as well; they sent up night fighters (they had very few) and shot down one B-29 and badly damaged another -neither plane from the 330th BG -but the demise of the B-29 was vividly described by the returning crews. Several crews saw a B-29 with one engine flaming, fired on by two sets of tracers 10 miles (16 km) beyond the target area; it exploded once in the air and again when it hit the ground at 27/0158G. Heavy and medium anti-aircraft fire was observed over the town but it was meager and inaccurate.

There were no planes lost or casualties on this mission.

==== Mission: 43 ====
- Date: 28–29 July
- Target: Ōgaki Urban Area
- Bomber Command Mission: 301

This was a memorable mission for the 330th Bomb Group. The target was Ōgaki urban area with a population of 56,000. In the first instance one aircraft had on board Ray Clark, a newsman from Station WOW, Omaha who broadcast live back to Guam and the States. He gave a running account of the anticipation and excitement of the bomb run. This unprecedented broadcast was sent out live over three networks and recorded for repeat broadcast by two other networks. Later, Ray Clark was able to get the aircraft and crew back to Nebraska in October 1945 to participate in a Victory Bond drive. The second highlight of the mission was that the City of Ogaki was part of a 20th Air Force Psychological Warfare Effort involving the Japanese people. Certain cities, Ōgaki being one of them, was the recipient of propaganda leaflets stating it would be, along with 10 other cities, firebombed in the near future and the civilians were warned to evacuate the city. The pamphlets warned that certain cities were to be bombed and they should evacuate the cities. Therefore, many Japanese cities in July and August 1945 were forewarned, including Hiroshima and Nagasaki (although the warning to Nagasaki may have come too late since the date of that mission was moved up a day due to weather predictions). The 330th BG sent 33 planes against Ogaki, dropping 227.26 tons of bombs consisting of E-46 and M-47 incendiaries. The 330th BG was joined by the 29th and 39th BGs; the 19th BG hit a different target. The total bomb load dropped on the town was 659 tons IB, burning 0.54 square miles (1.4 km^{2}) of Ogaki for an efficiency factor of 0.0008 square miles (2,100 m^{2}) per ton, not a very effective mission. Planes left North Field, Guam at 28/1807 -1940G and returned between 29/0900G -29/1000G. Bombs were away between 29/0201 – 29/0318G. Bombing results as reported by crews was good to excellent, with the last crew over the target reporting smoke up to 14,000 feet (4,300 m). Enemy opposition was stronger than met on previous night raids. Enemy fighters teamed with search lights in attacking planes with 5 passes made at three planes from the 330th BG. Meager to moderate heavy caliber anti-aircraft fire and meager to intense medium caliber anti-aircraft fire was encountered in the area with 15 to 20 searchlights with planes caught in the lights catching the most flak. The crews due to the pamphlets forewarning the Japanese of the attack and the clear night, which made a raid likely, believed the aggressive defenses. Calculated gas consumption was 5,974 US gallons (22,600 L) and the mission average was 6,075 US gallons (23,000 L).

Three planes landed at Iwo Jima for fuel. The 330th BG lost no planes and no casualties.

=== August ===
==== Mission: 44 ====
- Date: 1–2 August
- Target: Mito, Ibaraki Urban Area
- Bomber Command Mission: 309

The 330th BG scheduled a maximum effort with 43 aircraft. Two aborted, the remaining 41 bombed the primary target, Mito urban area. An estimated 73.1% or 1.22 square miles (3.2 km^{2}) of the town were burned for an efficiency rating of 0.0011 square miles (2,800 m^{2}) per ton. The town was located about 65 miles (100 km) northeast of Tokyo. The 330th BG contributed 289.71 tons to the 314th BW total of 1,145 tons. Enemy opposition was meager. Two searchlights were observed with meager and inaccurate heavy anti-aircraft and medium anti-aircraft fire. Six enemy aircraft were observed in the target area but made no attacks. All aircraft returned safely.

==== Mission: 45 ====
- Date: 5–6 August
- Target: Nishinomiya Urban Area
- Bomber Command Mission: 314

A minor city, Nishinomiya, population 112,000 between Kobe and Osaka was attacked this night with 6/10 cloud cover over the target during the bomb run. Thirty-three aircraft were scheduled for the mission with one 'Super Dumbo' (a group B-29 temporarily stripped of ammunition and filled with extra fuel tanks, liferafts, BC-778 "Gibson Girl" rescue radios and supplies that could be dropped to a downed crew), K-8, and one radar countermeasure (RCM) aircraft, K-55. Six Pathfinder aircraft carried mixed loads of M-47 and one 500 pounds (230 kg) T4/E4 and one 100 pounds (45 kg) M-46 bomb while the main force J carried 500 pounds (230 kg) E-46 incendiary clusters. The average bomb load was 7.5 tons per aircraft. The bomb run was made between 06/0125 -06/0208G at an average altitude of 13,400 feet (4,100 m). Of the 27 aircraft returning directly to base, 14 bombed by radar and 13 bombed visually with crews reporting good to excellent results. Later analysis indicated that 2.8 square miles (7.3 km^{2}) (29.65%) of the built up area was burned down. This was a joint mission with the 314th and 73rd BGs participating, dropping a total of 2,004 tons IB for an efficiency factor of 0.0014 square miles (3,600 m^{2}) per ton. It called for an average gas consumption of 6,238 US gallons (23,600 L) and the average used for the 26 planes that returned to North Field was 6,150 US gallons (23,300 L). One plane lost an engine on the way up and bombed a target of opportunity instead of the main target.

There were no planes lost or casualties.

==== Mission: 46 ====
- Date: 8 August
- Target: Nakajima Aircraft Company Engine Plant, Tokyo
- Bomber Command Mission: 320

This was the last daylight raid of the war for the 330th BG and it was an old favorite of the XXI Bomber Command. The target was Nakajima Aircraft Engine plant northwest of Tokyo. The first strategic target hit by the B-29s in November 1944 from the Marianas and had been hit 12 times previously by the 73rd. 58th BWs and Navy Carrier Task Force planes. Just to show how sometimes the larger picture reports are misleading as to what was actually bombed, this mission is a good example. The 314th BW summary reports that 60 planes from the 314th BW bombed the Tokyo arsenal, the radar target for the Bomber Command Mission #320. The Tokyo arsenal was the primary radar target and secondary visual target. The 330th BS's assembled into four formations over a small volcanic island due south of Tokyo, called Torishima, Toshima. They then proceeded to the target with the 458th BS in the lead followed by 459th BS, 457th BS and a composite formation. Flak was encountered from landfall to the target with heavy anti-aircraft (HAA), meager to moderate and generally accurate as to altitude. Approaching the target, HAA fire increased in intensity and accuracy and continued until the formations climbed out of the target area. The 458th BS formation attacked on an axis of 70 degrees and dropped its bombs from 22,000 feet (6,700 m). The 459th attacked on an axis of 175 degrees, overran the 458th BS formation, made a 360-degree turn and went over the primary target again. But, the formation could not see the target the second time around and went for the secondary visual target -Tokyo Army Arsenal. The 457th BS formation, on a heading of 72 degrees, dropped its bombs from 22,200 feet (6,800 m) and the composite formation on a heading of 73 degrees dropped its bombs from 22,900 feet (7,000 m). Why the 459th BS was on a heading of 175 degrees is not known. The weather over the primary target was almost ideal for a precision daylight-bombing raid with a few scattered clouds and visibility of 20 miles (30 km). Despite some snafus the 330th BG received its second DUC for its performance on this mission.

There were no planes lost and no casualties.

==== Mission: 47 ====
- Date: 14–15 August
- Target: Kumagaya, Saitama Urban Area
- Bomber Command Mission: 329

Since 12 April 1945, when the 330th BG went into action, until 8 August 1945, the normal time interval between missions was 2 to 3 days, sometimes one day and on rare occasions, 5 days. The time between the Nakajima mission and the Kumagaya mission was six days. Two atom bombs were dropped earlier this month. One on 6 August and the other on 9 August, and there were reports that the Japanese were thinking of surrendering, but this did not materialize in any concrete message from the Japanese. So the 330th BG was forced to go out again. This time against the Kumagaya urban area with a population of 47,000 located northwest of Tokyo but it was on a main rail line to the West Coast. Departure was at 14/1800 to 14/1907G and return was 15/0814 to 15/0915G. While some of the planes were landing the ROs reported that Japan had accepted the surrender terms offered by the Allies. Forty planes had taken off from North Field with four aborts due to trouble with the Wright Cyclone engines (three aborts lost an engine and one had an engine backfire). The remaining 36 aircraft included one Super Dumbo and one RCM craft. The RCM plane carried two 2 ton HE bombs and the other 34 aircraft carried E-46 and M-47 incendiary bombs. The average bomb load depending on the reference was 7.5 tons per aircraft or 6.3 tons per aircraft. Bombs were dropped by radar as the target was completely cloud covered. There was only meager and inaccurate flak and no enemy aircraft sighted. This was a joint mission with the 313th BW and a reported total of 593 tons of IB were dropped on Kumagaya burning 0.27 square miles (0.70 km^{2}) for an efficiency rating of 0.00046 square miles (1,200 m^{2}) per ton -not one of the most efficient area bombing missions.

Although this was the last official 'Combat' Mission for the 330th, it did not end the war for some crews. Until the Armistice was signed aboard the USS Missouri on 2 September 1945, crews flew food packages to POW camps and participated in show-of-force missions for which they got combat mission time (important in the point system that sent troops back to the US in the following months).

So ended the war, which started for the Americans on Monday, 8 December 1941 (Tokyo time; Sunday, 7 December 1941 Washington, D.C. and Hawaii time) and ended 15 August 1945 (Tokyo time).

=== Miscellaneous missions ===
12 April 1945 to 2 September 1945

North Field, Guam

There were four main types of reconnaissance : weather, photography, radar scope photo and measuring the enemy's radar signals. The BG also provided navigational escort for P-51 Mustangs from Iwo Jima to Japan and back. Occasionally a crew would be called upon to conduct a sea search for a downed aircraft. On 6/7 August 1945 Howard McClellan led a radar scope photography mission of various cities in southern Honshū. They saw the still-smoldering ruins of Hiroshima at twilight on 6 August 1945. On return, they described the devastation seen at Hiroshima stating that there must have been a large raid on the city to cause such damage though McClellan was not aware of any scheduled air raid on that city. Later the same night, McClellan was awakened and he personally had to describe what he had seen to General Power.

==== Radar jamming missions ====
Early in the war, it was identified that although the Japanese had sophisticated radar, it was not used effectively. The job of the 330th BG Radar Countermeasures Section (RCM) was to ensure that this was the case. The dramatic fall in 330th BG losses to zero in July and August 1945 was due, no doubt, to luck, but also to the work of this section. The RCM participated in all BG missions from 4 May 1945 till 15 August 1945. They searched for Japanese radar, spot jammed individual Japanese radar units and barrage jammed target areas with specially equipped B-29s called "Porcupines". Locating Japanese radar required specialized electronic equipment which was installed in these aircraft. The equipment included; a) a tuner-analyzer to measure the radar frequencies and strength and presumably the pulse width and pulse repetition frequency and b) four to five transmitters producing static noise, in effect drowning out Japanese radar signals.

They could determine whether the signals were emitted by gun laying radar or radar-directed searchlights or air-to-air radar carried by Japanese fighters. The radar countermeasures observer also noticed the coincidence of enemy signals with enemy action and the weather. What was not observed was just as important. The Japanese night fighters had no airborne radar. In a few cases, they were observed to have air-to-surface vessel (ASV) type radar. The Japanese radar operated on 75 and 200 megahertz bands but no 540-megahertz band radar was observed. The latter was the frequency of German Wurzburg radar which produced devastating results for the Eighth Air Force in the European theater.

On BG missions from 4 to 25 May 1945, radar signal analyzers were carried, but no radar jamming was permitted. Only "chaff" was used during this period. Due to the concentration of gun-laying radar around Tokyo, jamming was requested but it was denied. The 20th Air Force lost the largest number of B-29s over Tokyo on 25–26 May 1945. On all subsequent missions, either spot jamming or barrage jamming of enemy radar signals was done. The "chaff" consisted of spools of foil packaged in breakout containers and each spool gave the impression on enemy radar of a B-29. B-29 gunners stated that searchlight beams sometimes followed the chaff as it floated down. A variation on the foils were packets of "straws" -straw shaped strips coated with aluminium- packed 20 to a packet and dropped by the Navigator; these gave the impression on enemy radar of 20 B-29s.

Further reports stated that the foils falling across bare electric power and communication lines shorted them out, further complicating Japanese existence.

There were 42 RCM missions starting on 4 May 1945, which included 35 regular BG missions; two missions to assist the 315th BW, which had no RCM capability, and five special radar signal search missions. During this period, 440 enemy radar signals were observed and analyzed and this information was forwarded to higher echelons for collation with information from other sources. On the regular BG missions, the RCM observer would spot or barrage jam the detected Japanese signals but, since the aircraft would be in the area for only 10 to 15 minutes, it was not effective during the entire time that the group was over the target. The Group had six Porcupine aircraft and more were being added when the war ended. These B-29s were dedicated mainly to analyzing and jamming Japanese radar signals. They were used over targets with heavy concentrations of gun-laying and searchlight-controlling radar. They would stay in the target area during the entire bombing period. RCM activities were very effective based on numerous crew reports of searchlights frantically searching the sky with little degree of accuracy when there was partial undercast cloud cover. At times of completely undercast skies, the anti-aircraft fire was totally inaccurate when radar jamming was employed. Over Shimonoseki, with over 200 anti-aircraft guns, a Porcupine was in the area and no Group planes were lost. The 315th BW planes, employing the AN/APQ-7 Eagle radar, had a 70 nautical miles (130 km) long bomb run lasting 15 minutes, ideal for gun-laying radar. But at the heavily defended Kawasaki oil refinery no B-29's were lost due to the effects of the Porcupine jammers.

==== POW missions ====
The Americans had a pretty good idea where the Japanese POW camps were located and they also knew about the atrocious living conditions in the camps since the liberation of the POW camps in the Philippines and South East Asia. The Air Force launched a humanitarian effort to immediately relieve the POWs suffering by dropping food supplies to the camps, which were spread all over the Far East. The 330th BG participated in this effort. The 73rd BW Service Center on Saipan made up the packages and the appropriate mechanism to effectively drop these supplies by parachute. It was a massive effort and the 73rd BW alone dropped 2,000 tons from 472 effective sorties to POW camps on the Japanese home islands, Korea and China. Ten planes from the 330th BG flew to Saipan to pick up the supplies. The following day, 31 August 1945, they flew to Japan and dropped the supplies on POW camps around Osaka Flying back over Tokyo, one crew, K-3 got a close look at the devastation in Tokyo and a view of the naval flotilla steaming into Tokyo Bay with the USS Missouri on which the surrender took place two days later. The crew of K-5 were given the task of dropping supplies to a POW camp near Hong Kong. To accomplish this they had to fly to Clark Field in the Philippines and pick up supplies and information on the location of the camp.

- 29 August 1945: POW supply drop
- 30 August 1945: POW supply drop
- 31 August 1945: POW supply drop
- 31 August 1945: POW supply drop and reconnaissance -Hong Kong

One aircraft was asked to fly medical and food supplies to Okinawa which had been struck by an enormous typhoon days before. They did this with wooden platforms devised to be hung in the bomb bays. These platforms were loaded with supplies and lashed into place. Upon reaching Okinawa they were met by a crew of GIs who unloaded the supplies. After topping off the gas tanks they would head back to Guam. When they flew the aircraft to the states during the Sunset Project, they used the platforms again. This time they had about six passengers. Five Army enlisted men and one officer, all of whom had priority to return to the States. They had been in the Pacific area since before Pearl Harbor.

The 330th BG lost no planes in this effort, but the 73rd BW lost four planes in the effort, including one to the Russians who forced down a B-29 over Korea. The Cold War started early in the Far East.

==== Show of force missions ====
When Col. Reynolds moved up to Chief of Staff, 314th BW, the 330th BG continued to get important assignments. One such mission was to ferry the photographs of the Japanese surrender signing aboard the USS Missouri to Washington as quickly as possible. So a composite crew, consisting was formed for K-52. Since there was no runway around Tokyo long enough to land a B-29, the crew picked up the photos at Iwo Jima where they had been delivered by a B-17. The B-29 flew to Hawaii where the crew had four hours of sleep and then headed to Washington, DC. The plane lost an engine over the Rockies so they landed at Wright-Patterson AAF, Dayton, Ohio, and the photos were taken on by train to Washington, D.C.

- 30 August 1945: BS strength
- 31 August 1945: BS strength
- 1 September 1945: BS strength
- 2 September 1945: BG strength

==== Sept–Nov 1945 and Sunset Project ====
With victory in the Pacific achieved, the return of aircraft and crews not required for the occupation began under the Sunset Project. The aircraft were operated under ATC control flown by combat crews and with passengers assigned as extra crew members. The returning aircraft passed through the Marianas, Kwajalein, Johnston Island, and John Rodgers Field (Oahu) to Mather Field, California. This effort continued through the rest of the year and on into early 1946. By New Year's Day, 653 B-29's and 601 B-24's had made the homeward journey.
