= 330th Aircraft Sustainment Group =

330th Aircraft Sustainment Group
- Active: 1942–1944; 1944–1946; 1949–1951; 1952; 2005–2010
- Country: United States
- Branch: United States Air Force
- Role: Logistics management
- Part of: Air Force Materiel Command
- Garrison/HQ: Robins Air Force Base
- Engagements: Pacific Theater of Operations
- Decorations: Distinguished Unit Citation

Insignia
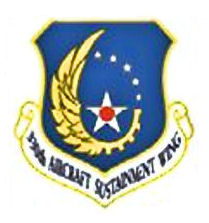
- 330th Aircraft Sustainment Group emblem

The 330th Aircraft Sustainment Group was a group of the United States Air Force stationed at Robins Air Force Base, Georgia. It was last active in June 2010

== History ==
=== World War II ===
The 330th Bombardment Group was constituted on 1 July 1942 at Salt Lake City Army Air Base, Utah. It was assigned to Second Air Force as a Consolidated B-24 Liberator Operational Training Unit (OTU) and later as a Replacement Training Unit (RTU). The group performed this training at Alamogordo Army Airfield in New Mexico, then later at Biggs Field near El Paso, Texas.

With the drawdown of heavy bomber training in 1944, the group was redesignated as the 330th Bombardment Group, Very Heavy and became a Boeing B-29 Superfortress operational bomb group being assigned to the 314th Bombardment Wing, to be sent to the Pacific Theater as part of the war against the Japanese Empire. The group was assigned to Walker Army Air Field, Kansas for equipping and training.

The group deployed to Guam in late 1944, and was assigned to XXI Bomber Command of the Twentieth Air Force. It entered combat on 12 April 1945 with an attack on the Hodogaya chemical plant at Koriyama, Japan. From April to May 1945, it struck airfields from which the Japanese were launching suicide planes against the invasion force at Okinawa. After that, operations were principally concerned with incendiary attacks against urban-industrial areas of Japan. It received a Distinguished Unit Citation for incendiary raids on the industrial sections of Tokushima and Gifu and for a strike against the hydroelectric power center at Kofu, Japan, in July 1945. Another DUC was received for attacking the Nakajima-Musashino aircraft engine plant near Tokyo in August 1945. The unit dropped food and supplies to Allied prisoners and participated in several show-of-force missions over Japan after the war.

The Group remained in Western Pacific, although largely demobilized in the fall of 1945. Some aircraft were scrapped on Tinian; others flown to storage depots in the United States. the group was inactivated in December 1945.

=== Air Force Reserve ===
With the end of World War II, the 330th was allotted to the Air Force Reserve. It was redesignated as the 330th Bombardment Group, and stationed at March Air Force Base, California for training with Boeing B-29 Superfortresses as a corollary unit of the active-duty Strategic Air Command 22d Bombardment Group. The group was activated on 27 June 1949 and assigned to the 330th Bombardment Wing under the wing base organization system. As a result of the Korean War its personnel were activated into Federal Service on 1 May 1951. The group was inactivated on 15 June, while many of its personnel deployed to Kadena Air Base, Okinawa for combat duty.

The 330th was again redesignated as the 330th Troop Carrier Group, Medium and assigned to the 1st Air Reserve District at Greater Pittsburgh Airport, Pennsylvania on 14 June 1952, when its parent wing replaced the 917th Reserve Training Wing there. One month later the group was inactivated and replaced by the 375th Troop Carrier Group, which had been released from active duty on 14 July 1952.

=== Sustainment Group ===
Reactivated in 2005 as a depot support unit at Robins Air Force Base. The group managed sustainment activities for the Lockheed C-130 Hercules aircraft to ensure availability was adequate for the weapon system to fulfill its assigned missions. The 330th was inactivated on 30 July 2010.

== Lineage ==
- Constituted as the 330th Bombardment Group (Heavy) on 1 July 1942

Activated on 6 July 1942
Inactivated on 1 April 1944

- Redesignated 330th Bombardment Group, Very Heavy and activated on 1 April 1944

Inactivated on 3 January 1946

- Redesignated 330th Bombardment Group, Medium on 16 May 1949

Activated in the reserve on 27 June 1949
Ordered to active duty on 1 May 1951
Inactivated on 16 June 1951

- Redesignated 330th Troop Carrier Group, Medium on 26 May 1952

Activated in the reserve on 14 June 1952
Inactivated on 14 July 1952

- Redesignated 330th Military Airlift Group on 31 July 1985
- Redesignated 330th Tactical Airlift Sustainment Group on 31 January 2005

Activated on 4 March 2005

- Redesignated 330th Airlift Sustainment Group on 17 April 2006

Inactivated on 30 July 2010

=== Assignments ===
- II Bomber Command, 6 July 1942 – 1 April 1944
- Second Air Force, 1 April 1944
- 314th Bombardment Wing, 6 June 1944
- Twentieth Air Force, 16 July 1945
- Army Service Forces, 15 November 1945 – 3 January 1946
- 330th Bombardment Wing, 27 June 1949 – 26 June 1951
- 330th Bombardment Wing, 14 Jun 1952 – 14 Jul 1952
- 330th Aircraft Sustainment Wing, 4 March 2005 – 30 July 2010

=== Components ===
- 330th Aircraft Sustainment Support Squadron, 17 April 2006 – 25 July 2007
- 457th Bombardment Squadron (later 457th Troop Carrier Squadron), 6 July 1942 – 1 April 1944, 1 April 1944 – 3 January 1946, 27 June 1949 – 16 June 1951; 14 June 1952 – 14 July 1952
- 458th Bombardment Squadron (later 458th Troop Carrier Squadron), 6 July 1942 – 1 April 1944, 1 April 1944 – 3 January 1946, 14 June 1952 – 14 July 1952
- 459th Bombardment Squadron (later 459th Troop Carrier Squadron), 6 July 1942 – 1 April 1944, 1 April 1944 – 3 January 1946, 14 June 1952 – 14 July 1952
- 450th Bombardment Squadron, 6 July 1942 – 1 April 1944, 1 April 1944 – 10 May 1944
- 560th Aircraft Sustainment Squadron: 14 April 2006 – 30 June 2010
- 561st Aircraft Sustainment Squadron: 14 April 2006 – 30 June 2010
- 26th Photographic Laboratory (Bombardment Group, Very Heavy), 1944 – c. 27 December 1945

=== Stations ===
- Salt Lake City Army Air Base, Utah, 6 July 1942
- Alamogordo Army Air Field, New Mexico, 1 August 1942
- Biggs Field, Texas, 2 September 1942
- Alamogordo Army Air Field, New Mexico, 29 November 1942
- Biggs Field, Texas, 5 April 1943 – 1 April 1944
- Walker Army Air Field, Kansas, 1 April 1944
- Dalhart Army Air Field, Texas, 25 May 1944
- Walker Army Air Field, Kansas, 1 August 1944 – 7 January 1945
- North Field, Guam, Northern Mariana Islands, 18 February – 19 November 1945
- Camp Anza, California, c. 18 – 27 December 1945
- March Air Force Base, California, 27 June 1949 – 16 June 1951
- Greater Pittsburgh Airport, Pennsylvania, 14 June – 14 July 1952
- Robins Air Force Base, Georgia, 4 March 2005 – 30 June 2010

=== Aircraft assigned ===
- Boeing B-17 Flying Fortress (1942, 1944)
- Consolidated B-24 Liberator (1942–1944)
- Boeing B-29 Superfortress (1944–1945, 1949–1951)
- Curtiss C-46 Commando, 1952

== See also ==
- 314th Air Division
