= Qui Nhon Airfield =

Former US airfield in Vietnam

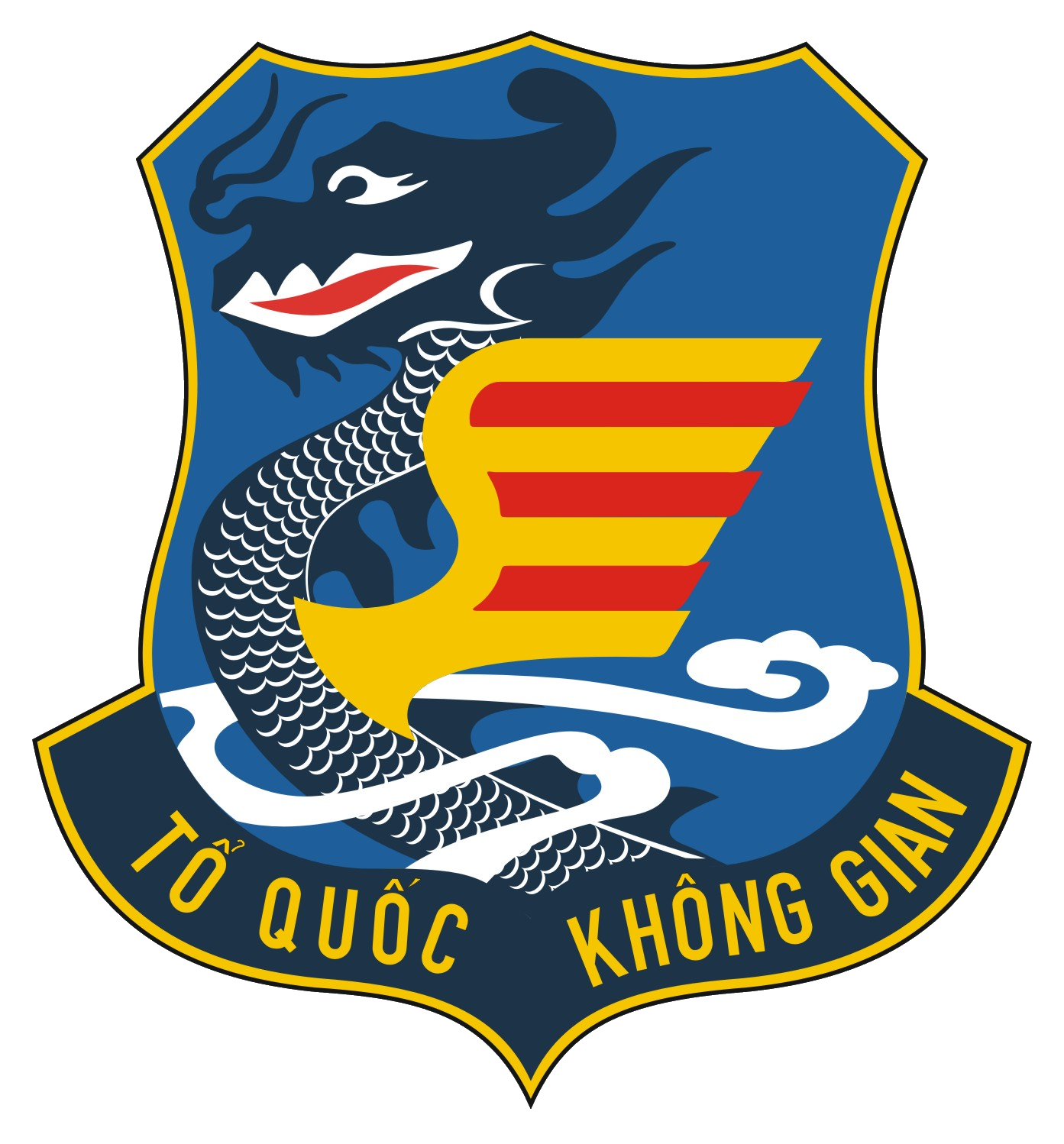
Qui Nhơn Airfield
- Qui Nhon, Binh Dinh Province in South Vietnam
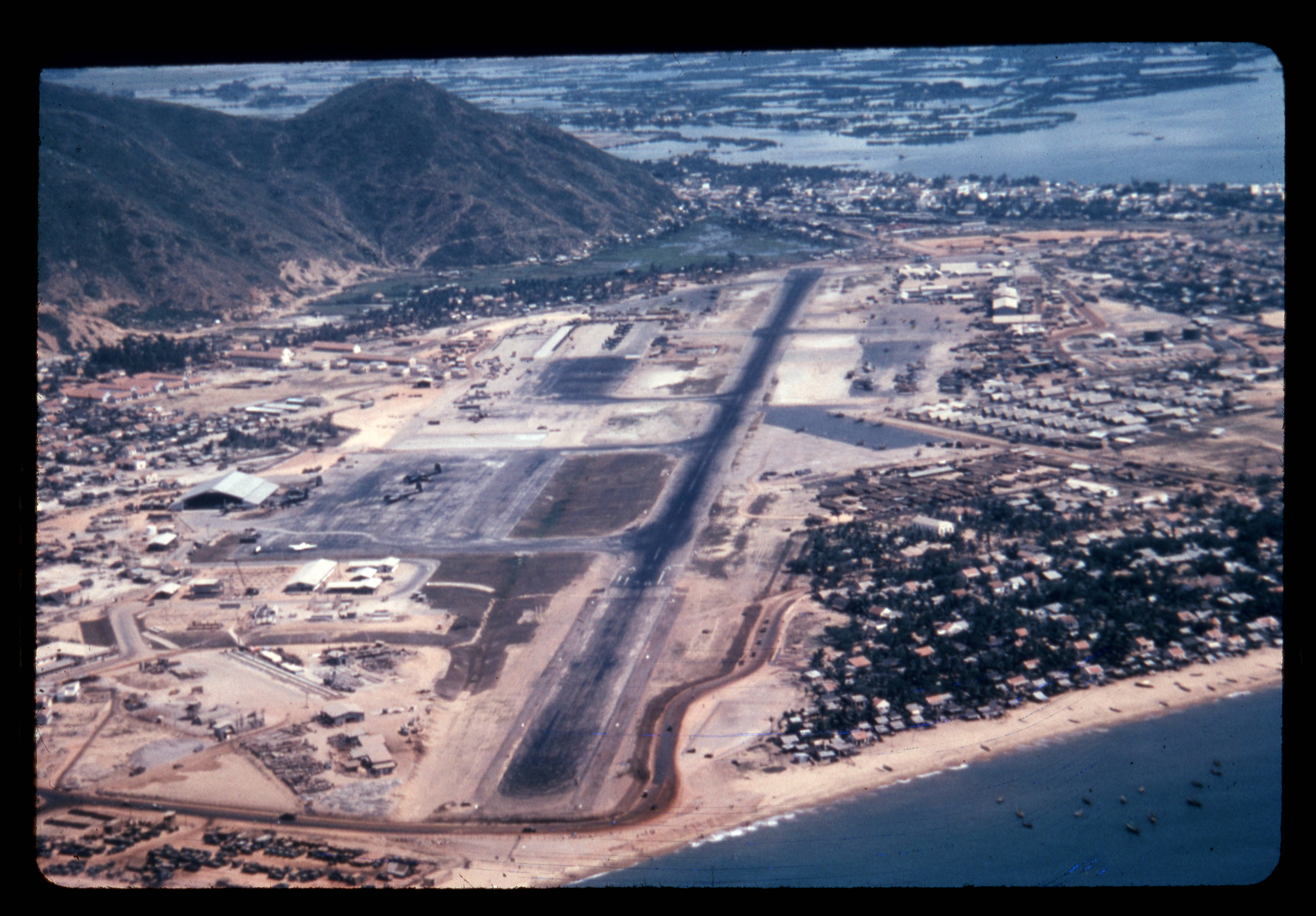
- Qui Nhơn Airfield, 13 April 1966

Site information
- Owner: Republic of Vietnam Air Force (RVNAF)
- Operator: Republic of Vietnam Air Force (RVNAF); Pacific Air Forces (USAF); United States Army (US Army)
- Condition: demolished

Location
- Coordinates: 13.766°N 109.222°E

Site history
- Built: 1966
- In use: 1966–1975
- Battles/wars: Vietnam War

Airfield information
- Identifiers: IATA: UIH, ICAO: VVQN
- Elevation: 10 feet (3 m) AMSL
Runways
Direction	Length and surface
03/21	5,100 feet (1,554 m)

Qui Nhơn Airfield (also known as Qui Nhơn Airport, Qui Nhơn Air Base or Qui Nhon Army Airfield) is a former United States Air Force, United States Army and Vietnam Air Force airfield located in Qui Nhon in Binh Dinh Province, Vietnam.

== History ==
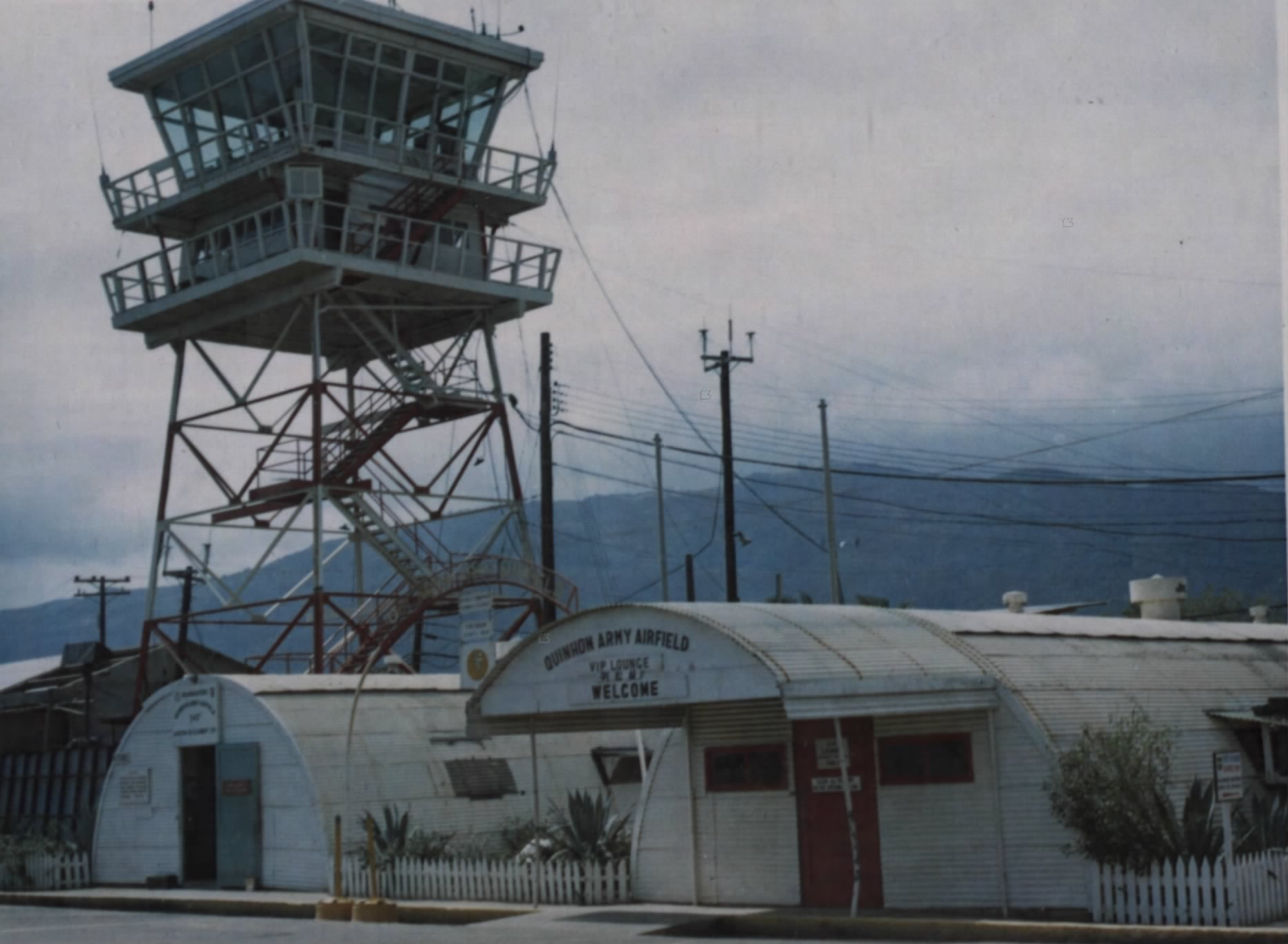
Qui Nhon Army Airfield control tower, 30 October 1970

In April 1966, the 84th Construction Battalion built a 1,197 feet (365 m) extension to the runway. In early 1967, the RMK-BRJ construction firm built a 3,400 feet (1,000 m) taxiway extension and various support buildings.

The 1883d Communications Squadron designated and organized at Qui Nhon Airfield, South Vietnam, 1 November 1965, forming part of the 1964th Communications Group. It then moved to Phu Cat Air Base on 1 April 1967.

Army units based at Qui Nhơn included:

- 8th Transportation Company (Piasecki CH-21C Shawnee) (1961–?)
- 57th Medical Detachment (Helicopter Ambulance) (UH-1B Huey) from March 1963.
- A platoon of 498th Medical Company (Air Ambulance) with UH-1D Hueys from October 1965.
- 498th Medical Company (Air Ambulance) (UH-1D) from 1967.
- 18th Aviation Company
- 61st Assault Helicopter Company
- 92nd Aviation Company
- 117th Aviation Company
- Company D, 52nd Infantry Regiment (from December 1966)
- 67th Evacuation Hospital (October 1966 – January 1971)
- 1098th Transportation Company (Medium Boat)

USAF units based at Qui Nhơn included:

- 15th Aerial Port Squadron
- 21st Tactical Air Support Squadron (detachments)
- 619th Tactical Control Squadron Detachment 12 (December 1965 – November 1966)

=== Current use ===
The base is now covered with commercial buildings while the former runway is now Nguyễn Tất Thành road. The city is served commercially by Phu Cat Airport.

== Accidents and incidents ==
- 18 September 1965 USAF Lockheed C-130A Hercules #55-0038 crashed into the sea while on final approach killing 4 of 11 crew and passengers
- 30 June 1966 USAF Fairchild C-123B Provider #54-0644 was damaged beyond repair at Qui Nhơn
- 30 November 1967 USAF de Havilland Canada C-7B Caribou #62-4175 on approach to Qui Nhơn diverted due to bad weather and hit a mountain 5 km (3.1 mi) south of the base killing all 26 passengers and crew
- 25 May 1970 U.S. Army Beechcraft U-21A #66-18026 was damaged beyond repair at Qui Nhơn

== See also ==
- Republic of Vietnam Air Force
- United States Pacific Air Forces
- Seventh Air Force
