= 330th Aircraft Sustainment Wing =

- Active: 1949–1951; 1952; 2005–2010
- Country: United States
- Branch: United States]
- Role: Equipment support

Insignia
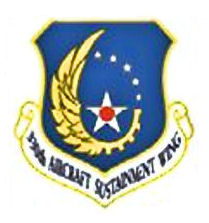
- 330th Aircraft Sustainment Wing emblem

The 330th Aircraft Sustainment Wing was a wing of the United States Air Force based at Robins Air Force Base, Georgia.

== Mission ==
The wing served as single focal point for cradle-to-grave sustainment management for the C-130 aircraft to sustain mission effectiveness throughout the system's life cycle. Responsible for all sustainment activities required to ensure C-130 aircraft availability was adequate for the weapon system to fulfill its assigned missions.

Primary activities included engineering, worldwide logistics, weapon system readiness, and wartime support. Managed aircraft overhaul, modernization and modification programs, and unscheduled depot level maintenance for the C-130 aircraft to include foreign military sales.

The wing also provided weapon system logistics support, oversaw unscheduled and programmed depot maintenance, and managed modification efforts for the Air Force's fleet of C-5, C-130, C-17, F-15, U-2, and E-8C Joint STARS aircraft, Global Hawk, Distributed Common Ground System (DCGS), MC-130, HC-130 and various special operations combat search and rescue aircraft and helicopters to include AC-130H/U, MC-130E/H/P/W, EC-130J, MH-53J/M, HH-60G, UH-1N, TH-1H, and HC-130P/N.

== History ==
=== Air Force Reserve ===
With the end of World War II, the 330th was allotted to the Air Force reserve. It was designated as the 330th Bombardment Wing, Medium and assigned to March Air Force Base, California for training with Boeing B-29 Superfortresses of the active-duty Strategic Air Command 22d Bombardment Wing, being activated on 27 June 1949. The wing was assigned to Fifteenth Air Force on 27 June 1949. As a result of the Korean War its personnel were activated into Federal Service on 1 May 1951 and deployed to Kadena AB, Okinawa for combat duty. . With its personnel deployed overseas, the wing was inactivated on 16 June.

The 330th was again redesignated as the 330th Troop Carrier Wing, Medium and allotted to 1st Air Reserve District at Greater Pittsburgh Airport, Pennsylvania on 14 Jun 1952. The unit may have just existed on paper and wasn't manned. It was also possibly equipped with Curtiss C-46 Commando aircraft. Nevertheless, it was inactivated on 14 Jul 1952.

Reactivated in 2005 as a depot support wing at Robins Air Force Base, Georgia. The 330th Aircraft Sustainment Wing was inactivated on 30 July 2010.

== Lineage ==
- Constituted as the 330th Bombardment Wing, Medium on 16 May 1949

Activated in the reserve on 27 June 1949
Ordered to active duty on 1 May 1951
Inactivated on 16 Jun 1951

- Redesignated 330th Troop Carrier Wing, Medium on 26 May 1952

Activated in the reserve on 14 June 1952
Inactivated on 14 July 1952

- Redesignated 330th Military Airlift Wing on 31 July 1985
- Redesignated 330th Aircraft Sustainment Wing on 31 January 2005

Activated on 4 March 2005
Inactivated on 30 July 2010

=== Assignments ===
- Tenth Air Force, 27 June 1949 (Attached to 22d Bombardment Wing)
- Fifteenth Air Force, 1 May 1951 – 26 June 1951 (attached to 12th Air Division)
- Tenth Air Force, 14 June 1952 – 14 July 1952
- Air Force Materiel Command, 4 May 2005 – 30 June 2010

=== Components ===
- 330th Bombardment Group (VH) (later 330th Troop Carrier Group, 330th Tactical Airlift Sustainment Group, 330th Aircraft Sustainment Group): 27 June 1949 – 26 June 1951, 14 June 1952 – 14 July 1952, 4 March 2005 – 30 June 2010
- 330 Command and Control & Intelligence, Surveillance and Reconnaissance Sustainment Group: 4 March 2005 – 14 April 2006
- 330 Fighter Sustainment Group: 4 March 2005 – 14 April 2006
- 330 Special Operations Forces and Combat Search and Rescue Sustainment Group: 4 March 2005 – 14 April 2006
- 330 Strategic Airlift Sustainment Group: 4 March 2005 – 14 April 2006
- 560th Aircraft Sustainment Group: 14 April 2006 – 30 June 2010
- 580th Aircraft Sustainment Group: 14 April 2006 – 30 June 2010
- 730th Aircraft Sustainment Group: 14 April 2006 – 30 June 2010
- 830th Aircraft Sustainment Group: 14 April 2006 – 30 June 2010

=== Stations ===
- March Air Force Base, California, 27 June 1949 – 16 June 1951
- Greater Pittsburgh Airport, Pennsylvania, 14 June – 14 July 1952
- Robins Air Force Base, Georgia, 4 March 2005 – 30 June 2010

=== Aircraft assigned ===
- Boeing B-29 Superfortress (1949–1951)
- Curtiss C-46 Commando, 1951

== See also ==
- 314th Air Division
