= List of United States Air Force airlift squadrons =

This article lists the airlift squadrons of the United States Air Force. The purpose of an airlift squadron is to organize and effect the delivery of supplies or personnel, usually via military transport aircraft such as the C-5 Galaxy, C-17 Globemaster III and C-130 Hercules.

== Airlift squadrons ==
Squadron	Shield	Location	Nickname	Aircraft Flown	Note
1st Airlift Squadron		Andrews AFB	SAM FOX	C-32, C-40	Active
2nd Airlift Squadron		Pope Field	Lancers	C-130 Hercules	Inactive
3rd Airlift Squadron		Dover AFB		C-17 Globemaster III	Active
4th Airlift Squadron		McChord AFB	Fighting Fourth	C-17 Globemaster III	Active
6th Airlift Squadron		Joint Base McGuire-Dix-Lakehurst	Bully Beef Express	C-17 Globemaster III	Active
7th Airlift Squadron		McChord AFB	Willing & Able	C-17 Globemaster III	Active
8th Airlift Squadron		McChord AFB	Workhorses	C-17 Globemaster III	Active
9th Airlift Squadron		Dover AFB	Pelicans	C-5 Galaxy	Active
10th Airlift Squadron		McChord AFB	Pathfinders	C-17 Globemaster III	Inactive
11th Airlift Squadron		Scott AFB		C-9A Nightingale	Inactive
12th Airlift Flight		Langley AFB		C-21	Inactive
14th Airlift Squadron		Charleston AFB	Pelicans	C-17 Globemaster III	Active
15th Airlift Squadron		Charleston AFB	Global Eagles	C-17 Globemaster III	Active
16th Airlift Squadron		Charleston AFB	Lions	C-17 Globemaster III	Active
17th Airlift Squadron		Charleston AFB	AAA Moving	C-17 Globemaster III	Inactive
19th Airlift Squadron		Travis AFB		C-141B Starlifter	Inactive
20th Airlift Squadron		Travis AFB		C-141B Starlifter	Inactive
21st Airlift Squadron		Travis AFB	Beeliners	C-17 Globemaster III	Active
22nd Airlift Squadron		Travis AFB	Mulies	C-5 Galaxy	Active
30th Airlift Squadron		Cheyenne Regional Airport		C-130 Hercules	Inactive
36th Airlift Squadron		Yokota AB	Eagle Airlifters	C-130J Super Hercules	Active
37th Airlift Squadron		Ramstein AB	Blue Tail Flies	C-130J Super Hercules	Active
38th Expeditionary Airlift Squadron		Ramstein AB	Delta Squadron	C-130 Hercules	Inactive
39th Airlift Squadron		Dyess AFB	Trailblazers	C-130J Super Hercules	Active
40th Airlift Squadron		Dyess AFB	Screaming Eagles	C-130J Super Hercules	Active
41st Airlift Squadron		Little Rock AFB	Black Cats	C-130J Super Hercules	Active
42nd Expeditionary Airlift Squadron		Ramstein AB		C-130J Super Hercules	Inactive
45th Airlift Squadron		Keesler AFB		C-21	Inactive
47th Airlift Flight		Wright-Patterson AFB		C-21	Inactive
48th Airlift Squadron		Little Rock AFB	Hoppers	C-130J Super Hercules	Inactive
50th Airlift Squadron		Little Rock AFB	Red Devils	C-130 Hercules	Inactive (now 50th Air Refueling Squadron)
52nd Airlift Squadron		Peterson AFB	Fighting 'Roos	C-130H Hercules	Inactive
53rd Airlift Squadron		Little Rock AFB	Black Jacks	C-130 Hercules	Inactive
54th Airlift Squadron		Scott AFB		C-40	Active
55th Airlift Flight		Osan AB		C-12 Huron	Inactive
56th Airlift Squadron		Altus AFB		C-5 Galaxy	Inactive (now 56th Air Refueling Squadron)
57th Airlift Squadron		Altus AFB		C-141B Starlifter	Inactive
58th Airlift Squadron		Altus AFB	Rat Pack	C-17 Globemaster III	Active
61st Airlift Squadron		Little Rock AFB	Green Hornets	C-130J Super Hercules	Active
62nd Airlift Squadron		Little Rock AFB	Blue Barons	C-130J Super Hercules	Active
65th Airlift Squadron		Hickam AFB		C-40 Clipper	Active
68th Airlift Squadron		Lackland Air Force Base		C-5 Galaxy	AFRC
73rd Airlift Squadron		Scott AFB		C-40 Clipper	Active
75th Airlift Squadron		Ramstein AB		C-9 Nightingale	Inactive
76th Airlift Squadron		Ramstein AB		C-21, C-37	Active
89th Airlift Squadron		Wright-Patterson AFB	Rhinos	C-17 Globemaster III	AFRC
95th Airlift Squadron		Pope AFB	Flying Badgers	C-130 Hercules	Inactive
96th Airlift Squadron		Minneapolis-Saint Paul IAP	Flying Vikings	C-130H Hercules	AFRC
97th Airlift Squadron		McChord AFB	Fightin' Roos	C-17 Globemaster III	Active
99th Airlift Squadron		Andrews AFB	SAM FOX	C-37	Active
105th Airlift Squadron		Berry Field Air National Guard Base, Tennessee Air National Guard	Music	C-130H Hercules	Inactive (now 105th Attack Squadron)
109th Airlift Squadron		Minneapolis–Saint Paul Joint Air Reserve Station		C-130H Hercules	Minnesota ANG
118th Airlift Squadron		Bradley Air National Guard Base	Flying Yankees	C-130H Hercules	Connecticut ANG
115th Airlift Squadron		Channel Islands Air National Guard Station	Hollywood Guard	C-130J Super Hercules	California ANG
130th Airlift Squadron		Yeager Airport	Mountaineers	C-130J Super Hercules	West Virginia ANG
135th Airlift Squadron		Warfield Air National Guard Base	Baltimore's Best	C-130J Super Hercules	Inactive
136th Airlift Squadron		Niagara Falls IAP	New York's Finest	C-130 Hercules	Inactive (now 136th Attack Squadron)
137th Airlift Squadron		Stewart ANGB	Hudson Haulers	C-17 Globemaster III	New York ANG
139th Airlift Squadron		Stratton ANGB	Raven Gang	LC-130H Hercules	New York ANG
142nd Airlift Squadron		New Castle Air National Guard Base		C-130H Hercules	Delaware ANG
143rd Airlift Squadron		Quonset Point Air National Guard Station		C-130J Super Hercules	Rhode Island ANG
144th Airlift Squadron		Joint Base Elmendorf-Richardson		C-17 Globemaster III	Alaska ANG
155th Airlift Squadron		Memphis IAP	Memphis Belle	C-17 Globemaster III	Tennessee ANG
156th Airlift Squadron		Charlotte/Douglas IAP	First in Flight	C-17 Globemaster III	North Carolina ANG
158th Airlift Squadron		Savannah/Hilton Head IAP	Guard Dawgs	C-130J Super Hercules	Georgia ANG
164th Airlift Squadron		Mansfield Lahm Air National Guard Base		C-130 Hercules	Inactive
165th Airlift Squadron		Louisville IAP	Thoroughbred Express	C-130J Super Hercules	Kentucky ANG
167th Airlift Squadron		Shepherd Field Air National Guard Base		C-17 Globemaster III	West Virginia ANG
169th Airlift Squadron		Peoria Air National Guard Base		C-130H Hercules	Illinois ANG
178th Airlift Squadron		Hector International Airport North Dakota ANG		C-21 Learjet	Inactive (now 178th Attack Squadron)
180th Airlift Squadron		Rosecrans Memorial Airport	Pony Express	C-130H Hercules	Missouri ANG
181st Airlift Squadron		Naval Air Station Joint Reserve Base Fort Worth		C-130H Hercules	Texas ANG
183d Airlift Squadron		Jackson-Evers IAP	Wings of the Deep South	C-17 Globemaster III	Mississippi ANG
186th Airlift Squadron		Great Falls International Airport	Vigilantes	C-130H Hercules	Wyoming ANG
187th Airlift Squadron		Cheyenne Air National Guard Base	Let 'er Buck	C-130H Hercules	Wyoming ANG
189th Airlift Squadron		Gowen Field Air National Guard Base		C-130 Hercules	Inactive Idaho ANG
192d Airlift Squadron		Reno/Tahoe IAP	High Rollers	C-130H Hercules	Nevada ANG
198th Airlift Squadron		Luis Muñoz Marín IAP	Buccaneros	C-130 Hercules	Inactive Puerto Rico ANG
200th Airlift Squadron		Peterson AFB	Bobcats	C-21	Inactive Colorado ANG
201st Airlift Squadron		Andrews AFB		C-40 Clipper	District of Columbia ANG
204th Airlift Squadron		Hickam Air Force Base	Owls	C-17 Globemaster III	Hawaii ANG
249th Airlift Squadron		Elmendorf AFB		C-17 Globemaster III	Inactive Alaska ANG
300th Airlift Squadron		Charleston AFB		C-17 Globemaster III	AFRC
301st Airlift Squadron		Travis AFB		C-17 Globemaster III	AFRC
309th Airlift Squadron		Chievres AB		C-37	Inactive
310th Airlift Squadron		MacDill AFB		C-37	Inactive (now 310th Special Operations Squadron)
311th Airlift Squadron		Peterson AFB		C-21	Inactive
312th Airlift Squadron		Travis AFB		C-5 Galaxy	AFRC
313th Airlift Squadron		McChord AFB		C-17 Globemaster III	AFRC
317th Airlift Squadron		Charleston AFB	First in Reserve	C-17 Globemaster III	AFRC
326th Airlift Squadron		Dover AFB	Flying Bunnies	C-17 Globemaster III	AFRC
327th Airlift Squadron		Little Rock AFB		C-130J Super Hercules	AFRC
328th Airlift Squadron		Niagara Falls IAP		C-130 Hercules	Inactive (now 328th Air Refueling Squadron)
337th Airlift Squadron		Westover ARB	Patriot Wing	C-5 Galaxy	AFRC
346th Tactical Airlift Squadron		Ching Chuan Kang Air Base, Taiwan	Black Knights	C-130 Hercules	Inactive
356th Airlift Squadron		Lackland AFB		C-5 Galaxy	AFRC
357th Airlift Squadron		Maxwell AFB	Deliverance	C-130H Hercules	AFRC
457th Airlift Squadron		Andrews AFB		C-21	Inactive
458th Airlift Squadron		Scott AFB		C-21	Active
459th Airlift Squadron		Yokota Air Base		C-12 Huron; C-21 UH-1 Iroquois	Active
517th Airlift Squadron		Elmendorf AFB	Firebirds	C-12 Huron; C-17 Globemaster III	Active
535th Airlift Squadron		Hickam Air Force Base	Tigers	C-17 Globemaster III	Active
700th Airlift Squadron		Dobbins ARB		C-130H Hercules	AFRC
701st Airlift Squadron		Charleston AFB	Turtles	C-17 Globemaster III	AFRC
707th Airlift Squadron		Charleston AFB	Rooks Defense	C-141 Starlifter	Inactive
709th Airlift Squadron		Dover AFB		C-5 Galaxy	AFRC
728th Airlift Squadron		McChord AFB	Flying Knights	C-17 Globemaster III	AFRC
729th Airlift Squadron		March ARB	Pegasus	C-17 Globemaster III	AFRC
730th Airlift Squadron		March ARB		C-17 Globemaster III	Inactive (now 730th Air Mobility Training Squadron)
731st Airlift Squadron		Peterson AFB		C-130H Hercules	AFRC
732nd Airlift Squadron		Joint Base McGuire-Dix-Lakehurst	Rams	C-17 Globemaster III	AFRC
737th Expeditionary Airlift Squadron		Ali Al Salem Air Base, Kuwait	Desert Foxes	C-130 Hercules	Inactive
738th Expeditionary Airlift Squadron		Ali Al Salem Air Base, Kuwait		C-130 Hercules	Inactive
745th Expeditionary Airlift Squadron		Al Udeid Air Base, Qatar		C-130 Hercules	ACC
746th Expeditionary Airlift Squadron		Al Udeid Air Base, Qatar	Blue-Nosed Mules	C-130 Hercules	ACC
756th Airlift Squadron		Andrews AFB	Toothless Tigers	C-141B Starlifter	Inactive (now 756th Air Refueling Squadron)
757th Airlift Squadron		Youngstown ARS	Blue Tigers	C-130J Super Hercules	AFRC
758th Airlift Squadron		Pittsburgh IAP		C-17 Globemaster III	AFRC
763rd Expeditionary Airlift Squadron		Seeb International Airport, Oman	Camelbacks	C-130 Hercules	Inactive (OSW/OEF 1998-2002)
772nd Expeditionary Airlift Squadron		Kandahar Airfield, Afghanistan	Gun Runners	C-130J Hercules	Inactive
773rd Airlift Squadron		Youngstown ARS	Fleagles	C-130 Hercules	Inactive
774th Expeditionary Airlift Squadron		Bagram Air Base, Afghanistan	Green Weasels	C-130 Hercules	Inactive
776th Expeditionary Airlift Squadron		PAF Base Shahbaz, Pakistan	Red Lions	C-130 Hercules	Inactive
777th Expeditionary Airlift Squadron		Joint Base Balad, Iraq	Dueling Dragons	C-130 Hercules	Inactive
778th Expeditionary Airlift Squadron				C-130 Hercules	Inactive
779th Expeditionary Airlift Squadron		Ali Al Salem Air Base, Kuwait		C-130 Hercules	Inactive
780th Expeditionary Airlift Squadron		Mihail Kogălniceanu Air Base, Romania		C-17 Globemaster III	Active
815th Airlift Squadron		Keesler AFB	Jennies	C-130J	AFRC
816th Expeditionary Airlift Squadron		Al Udeid Air Base, Qatar		C-17 Globemaster III	Inactive
817th Expeditionary Airlift Squadron		Manas Air Base, Kyrgyzstan		C-17 Globemaster III	Inactive

== See also ==
- List of United States Air Force squadrons
