= 55th Airlift Flight =

55th Airlift Flight

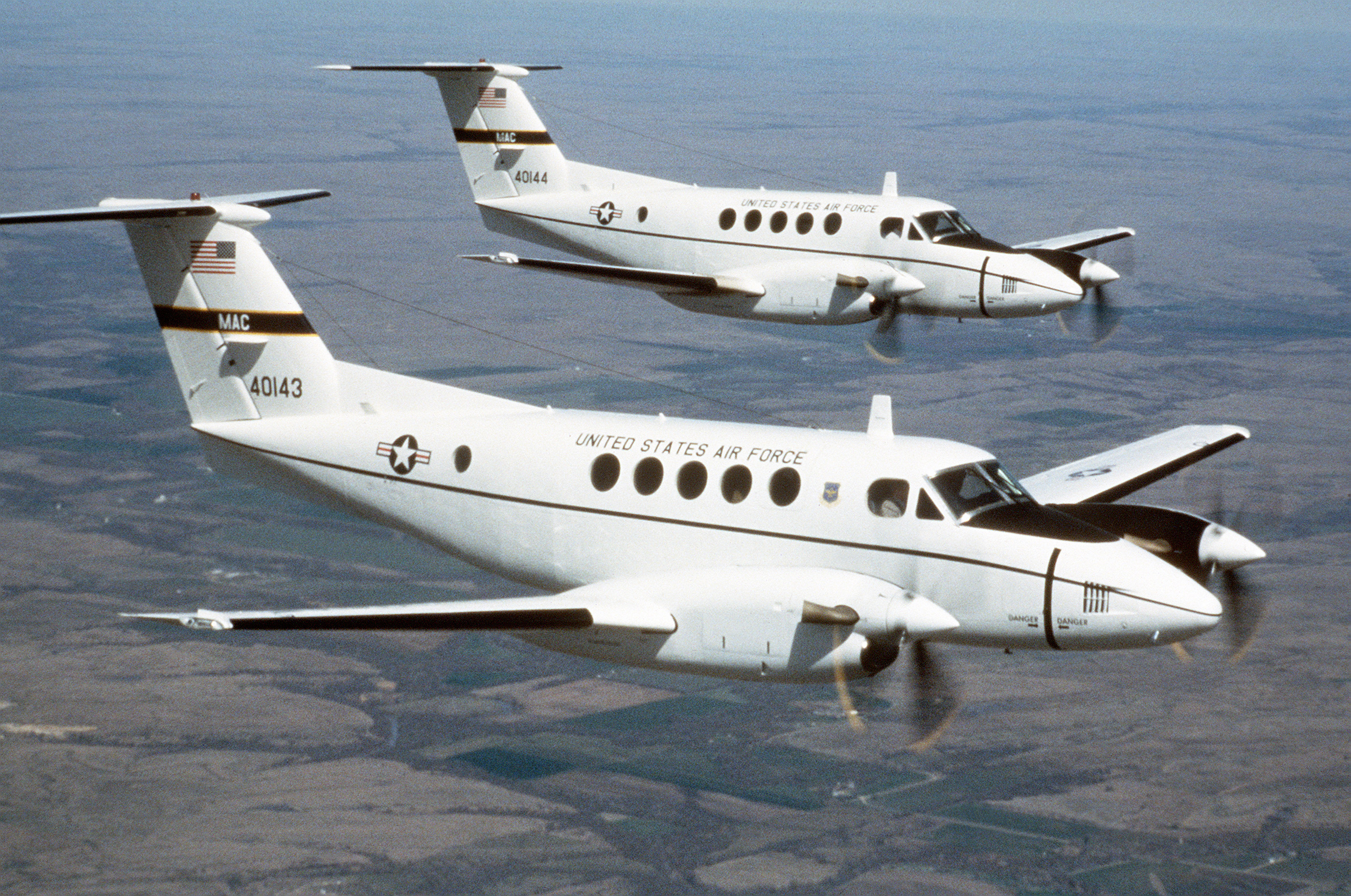
- Two C-12 Huron operational support aircraft as flown by the 55th
- Active: 1942–1946; 1947–1952; 1952–1957; 1992–2007
- Country: United States
- Branch: United States Air Force
- Role: Operation Support Airlift
- Part of: Pacific Air Forces
- Garrison/HQ: Osan Air Base
- Motto: Double Nickle Airlift (1993–2007)
- Engagements: Southwest Pacific Theater
- Decorations: Air Force Outstanding Unit Award; Philippine Presidential Unit Citation

Insignia
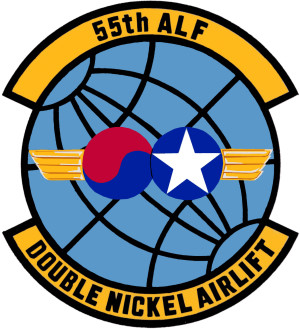
- 55th Airlift Flight emblem (approved 3 December 1993)

The 55th Airlift Flight (55 ALF) is an inactive unit of the United States Air Force, last stationed at Osan Air Base, South Korea. It was inactivated in 2007.

The unit was first activated as the 55th Troop Carrier Squadron in 1942. The squadron deployed to New Guinea in July 1943. The 55th participated in the airborne assault on Nadzab, New Guinea, on 5 September 1943. During 1944, the 55th also operated Boeing B-17 Flying Fortress bombers as supply aircraft. In February 1945 the squadron rebased to the Philippines, and in August to Okinawa. In September 1945 it moved to Tachikawa Airfield, Japan, and was inactivated there in 1946.

The squadron was activated in the reserves in May 1947, and mobilised for the Korean War in October 1950. In Korea it performed airlift support missions until July 1952. The squadron returned to the reserves for 3 years and was inactivated on 16 November, 1957.

On 1 July 1992 the squadron was re-activated as the 55th Airlift Flight at Osan Air Base, South Korea, equipped with Beechcraft C-12 Hurons. Its mission since activation has been to ferry VIPs and senior personnel throughout the Pacific region.

== History ==
=== World War II ===
The flight was first activated as the 55th Troop Carrier Squadron at Bowman Field, Kentucky. It was one of the original squadrons of the 375th Troop Carrier Group and equipped with Douglas C-47 Skytrains. The squadron trained at various I Troop Carrier Command bases until June 1943, preparing for a move overseas.

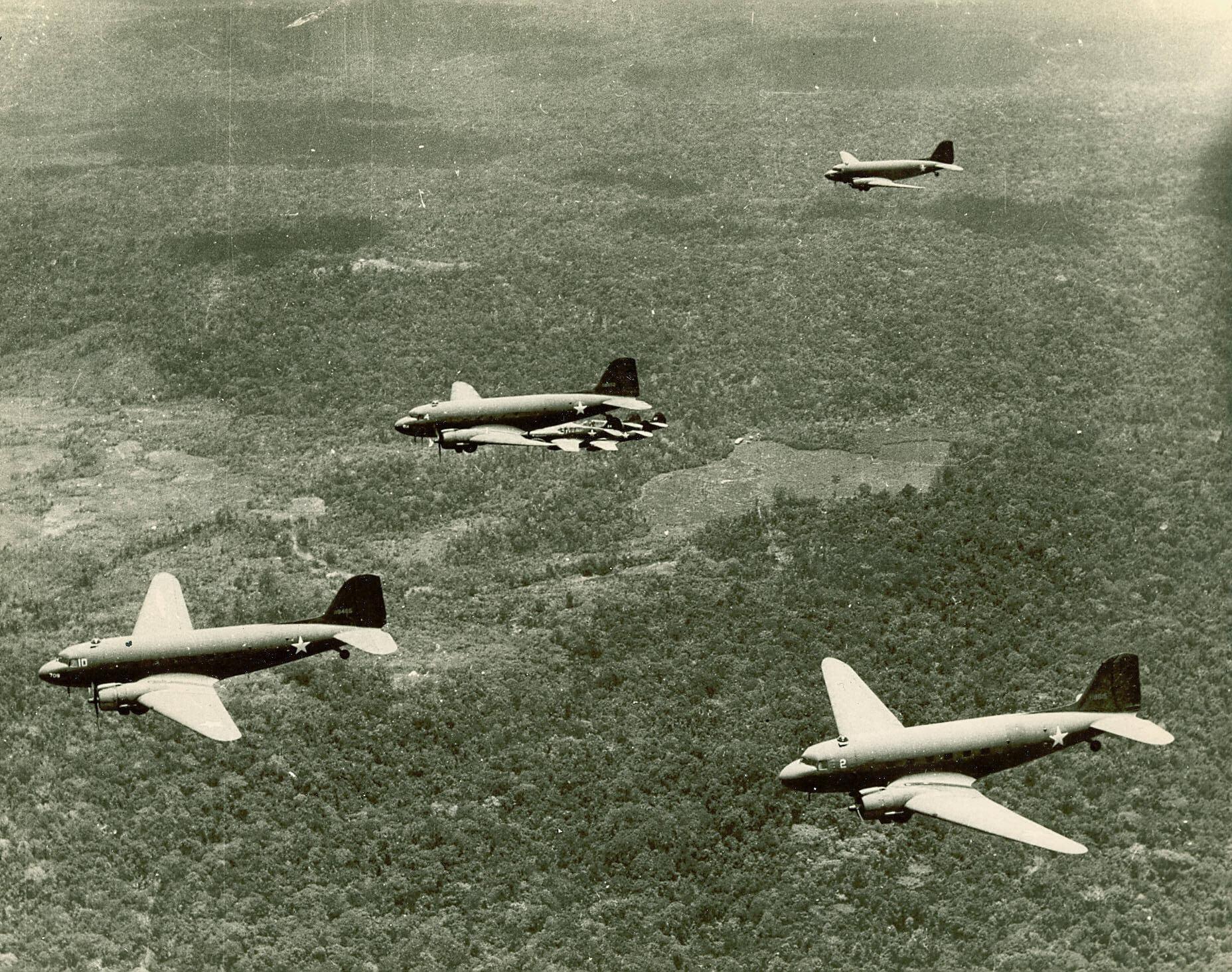
File:Four C-47 escorted by P-40s over New Guinea

The squadron arrived in New Guinea in July 1943. It transported personnel and supplies to forward bases in New Guinea, New Britain, the Solomon Islands and the Admiralty Islands. During 1944, the 55th also operated Boeing B-17 Flying Fortress bombers. These planes were used for landing supplies at airfields that were under attack by Japanese forces, as their armament provided a means to defend themselves.

The 55th participated in the airborne assault on Nadzab, New Guinea, on 5 September 1943. This was the first airborne operation to be conducted in the Southwest Pacific Theater. The operations seized the Japanese airfields at Nadzab (from which the squadron would later operate) and cut supply lines for enemy forces in the area. Although the squadron retained some C-47s until the end of the war, during 1944 it converted to the Curtiss C-46 Commando as its primary aircraft.

The squadron moved forward with American forces to the Philippines in February 1945, and to Okinawa in August, continuing to fly supply missions to military in the area. It supported landing forces in the Ryuku Islands beginning in June. Following VJ Day, the squadron flew troops from the Philippines to Okinawa to stage for further movement to Japan and on return flights carried former Prisoners of War back to the Philippines.

In September 1945, the squadron moved to Tachikawa Airfield, where it served in the occupation forces in Japan. The squadron was inactivated with the other units of the 375th Group in March 1946, as the airlift mission at Tachikawa was taken over by the 317th Troop Carrier Group, which had arrived there in January 1946.

=== Reserve training and Korean War mobilization ===
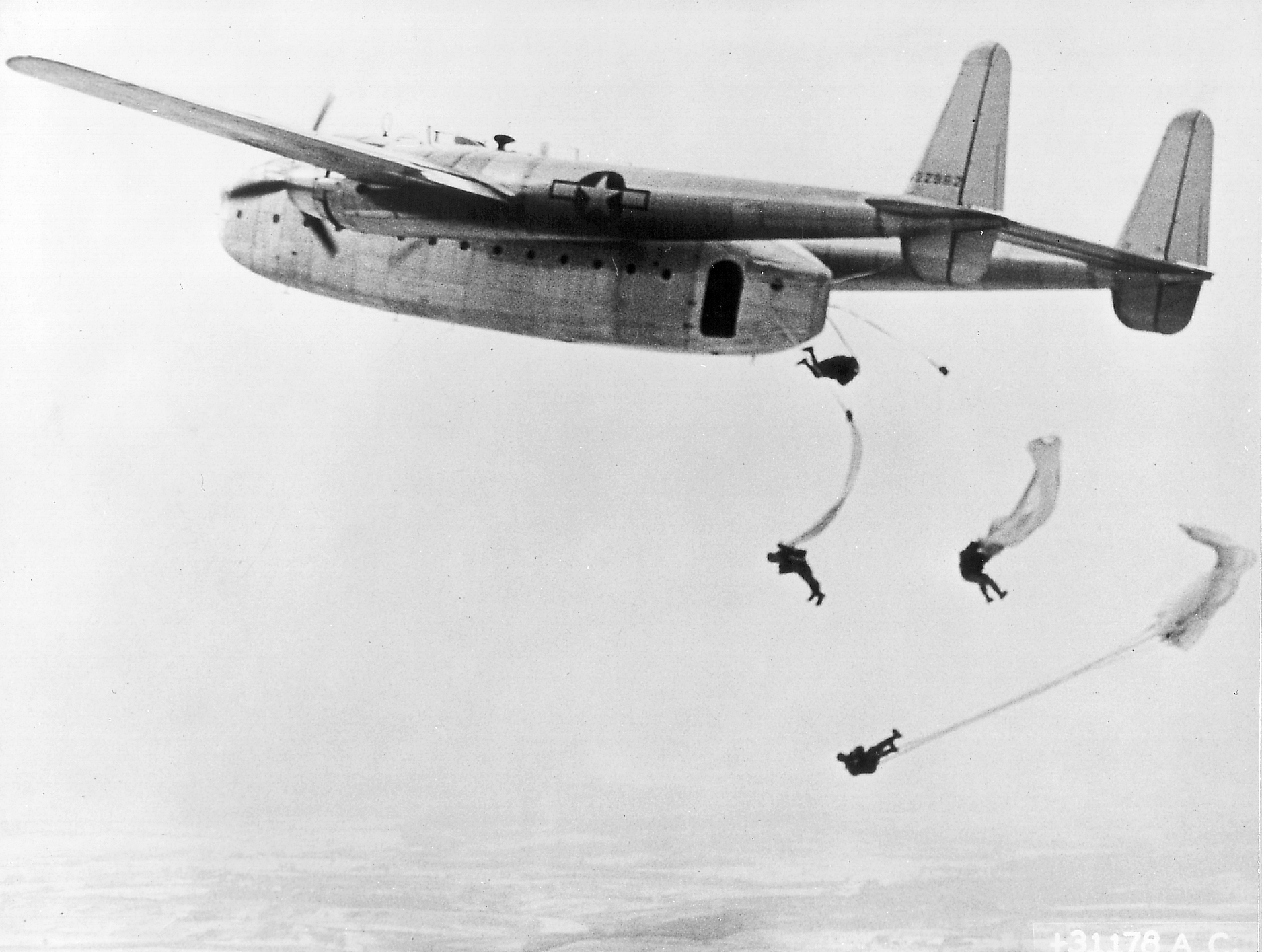
Paratroopers jump from a C-82

The squadron was activated in the reserves under Air Defense Command (ADC) at Reading Army Air Field, Pennsylvania in May 1947. It was again assigned to the 375th Group, which was located at Greater Pittsburgh Airport, Pennsylvania. Little more than two months after its activation, the squadron moved to Northeast Philadelphia Airport, Pennsylvania. It does not appear the squadron was fully manned or equipped at this time. In June 1949, Continental Air Command, which had assumed responsibility for managing reserve units from ADC in 1948, reorganized its reserve flying units under the wing base organizational system, which placed combat and support units on a base under a single commander. As part of this reorganization and also in response to President Truman's reduced 1949 defense budget which required reductions in the number of units in the Air Force, reserve flying operations at Northeast Philadelphia Airport were terminated and the squadron joined its parent group in Pittsburgh, replacing the 70th Troop Carrier Squadron.

The 55th, like all reserve combat units was mobilized for the Korean war. It was part of the first wave of mobilization, following the 452d Bombardment Wing and 437th Troop Carrier Wing, being called up in October 1950. Its parent 375th Troop Carrier Wing was assigned to Tactical Air Command, moving to Greenville Air Force Base, South Carolina upon mobilization where it began to equip with Fairchild C-82 Packets. Along with six C-46 reserve wings mobilized later, the 375th Wing formed TAC's Eighteenth Air Force. The squadron performed airlift support missions until July 1952, when it was relieved from active duty and replaced by the 17th Troop Carrier Squadron.

=== Reactivation in the reserve ===
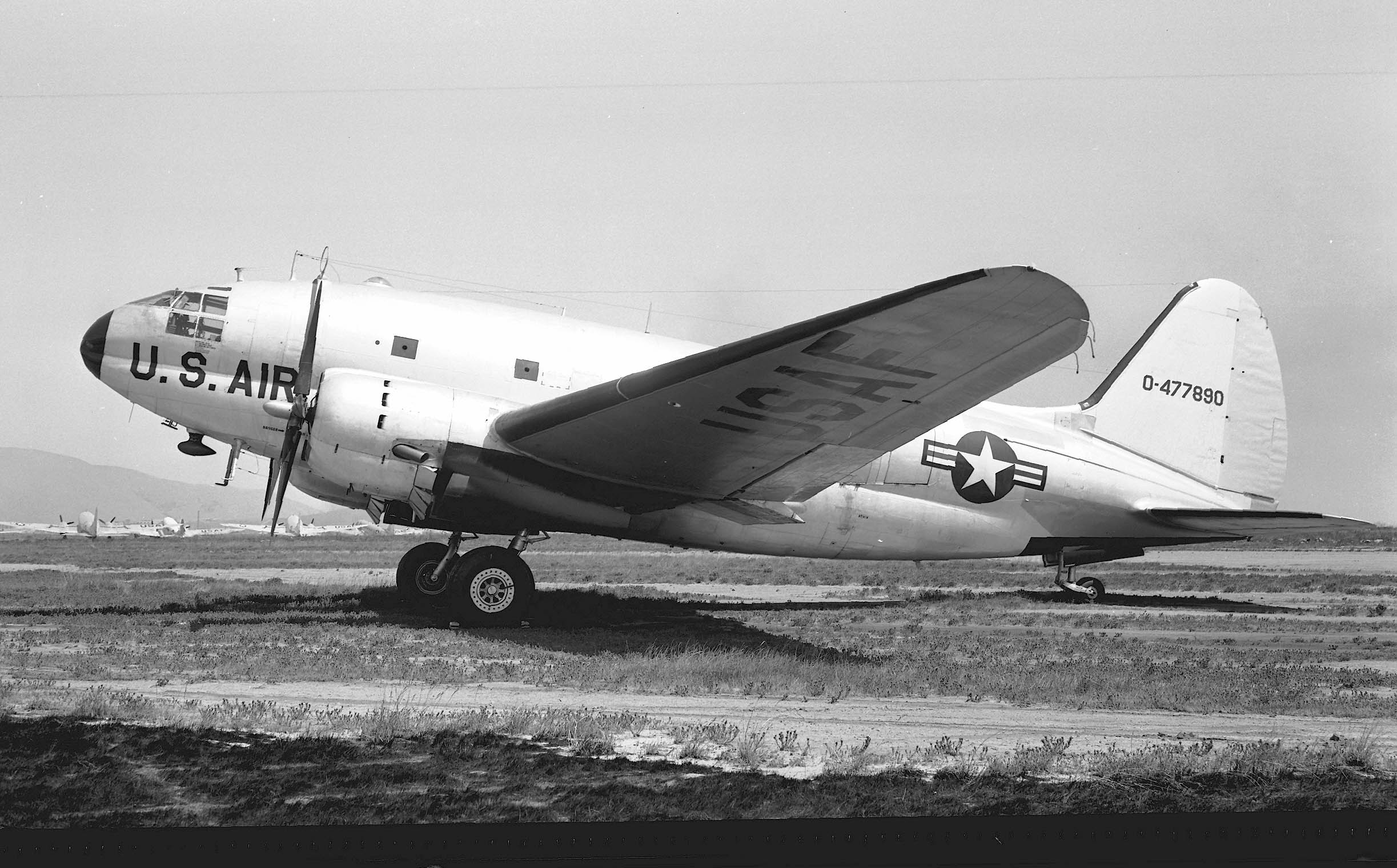
C-46D as flown by the squadron

The same day it was inactivated, the squadron returned to the reserve in Pennsylvania where it replaced the 457th Troop Carrier Squadron, which had been activated at Greater Pittsburgh Airport the previous month when the reserve began to receive aircraft to replace the ones that had been transferred to the regular air force when the reserves were mobilized. The squadron trained as an airlift unit with C-46 Commandos until about 1954, then with Fairchild C-119 Flying Boxcars. Cuts in the budget in 1957 led to inactivation of three troop carrier wings, including the 375th and its component squadrons. On 16 November, the squadron was inactivated, as all the remaining resources of the 375th Wing were compressed into a single squadron, the 758th Troop Carrier Squadron, which was activated at Pittsburgh the same day.

=== Operational support airlift ===
The squadron was redesignated the 55th Airlift Flight and activated at Osan Air Base, South Korea on 1 July 1992. At Osan, it was assigned to the 51st Operations Group and equipped with Beechcraft C-12 Hurons. Its mission since activation has been to ferry VIPs and senior personnel throughout South Korea and the Pacific. The unit was inactivated at Osan Air Base on 1 July 2007.

== Lineage ==
- Constituted as the 55th Troop Carrier Squadron on 12 November 1942

Activated on 18 November 1942
Inactivated on 25 March 1946

- Activated in the reserve on 9 August 1947

Redesignated 55th Troop Carrier Squadron, Medium on 27 June 1949
Ordered to active duty on 15 October 1950
Relieved from active duty on 3 July 1952
Inactivated on 14 July 1952

- Activated in the reserve on 14 July 1952

Inactivated on 16 Nov 1957

- Redesignated 55th Airlift Flight and activated, on 1 July 1992

Inactivated on 1 July 2007

=== Assignments ===
- 375th Troop Carrier Group, 18 November 1942 – 25 March 1946
- 375th Troop Carrier Group, 9 August 1947 – 14 July 1952
- 375th Troop Carrier Group, 14 July 1952 – 16 November 1957
- 51st Operations Group, 1 July 1992 – 1 July 2007

=== Stations ===
- Bowman Field, Kentucky, 18 November 1942
- Sedalia Army Air Field, Missouri, 24 January 1943
- Laurinburg-Maxton Army Air Base, North Carolina, 6 May 1943
- Baer Field, Indiana, 2–17 June 1943
- Port Moresby Airfield Complex, New Guinea, c. 15 July 1943
- Dobodura Airfield Complex, New Guinea, 19 August 1943
- Port Moresby Airfield Complex, New Guinea, 22 December 1943
- Nadzab Airfield Complex, New Guinea, 22 April 1944
- Biak, c. 1 October 1944
- San Marcelino Airfield, Luzon, Philippines, 19 February 1945
- Porac Airfield, Luzon, Philippines, 16 May 1945
- Okinawa, 25 August 1945
- Tachikawa Airfield, Japan, c. 20 September 1945 – 25 March 1946
- Reading Army Air Field, Pennsylvania, 9 August 1947
- Northeast Philadelphia Airport, Pennsylvania, 22 October 1947
- Greater Pittsburgh Airport, Pennsylvania, 27 June 1949
- Greenville Air Force Base (later Donaldson Air Force Base), South Carolina, 16 October 1950 – 14 July 1952
- Greater Pittsburgh International Airport, Pennsylvania, 14 July 1952 – 16 November 1957
- Osan Air Base, South Korea, 1 July 1992 – 1 July 2007

=== Aircraft ===
- Douglas C-47 Skytrain, 1942–1945
- Boeing B-17 Flying Fortress, 1944
- Curtiss C-46 Commando, 1944–1946, 1952-c. 1955
- Fairchild C-82 Packet, 1950–1952
- Fairchild C-119 Flying Boxcar c.. 1954–1957
- Beechcraft C-12 Huron, 1992–2007

== See also ==
- List of United States Air Force airlift squadrons
- List of Douglas C-47 Skytrain operators
