= 457th Airlift Squadron =

457th Airlift Squadron

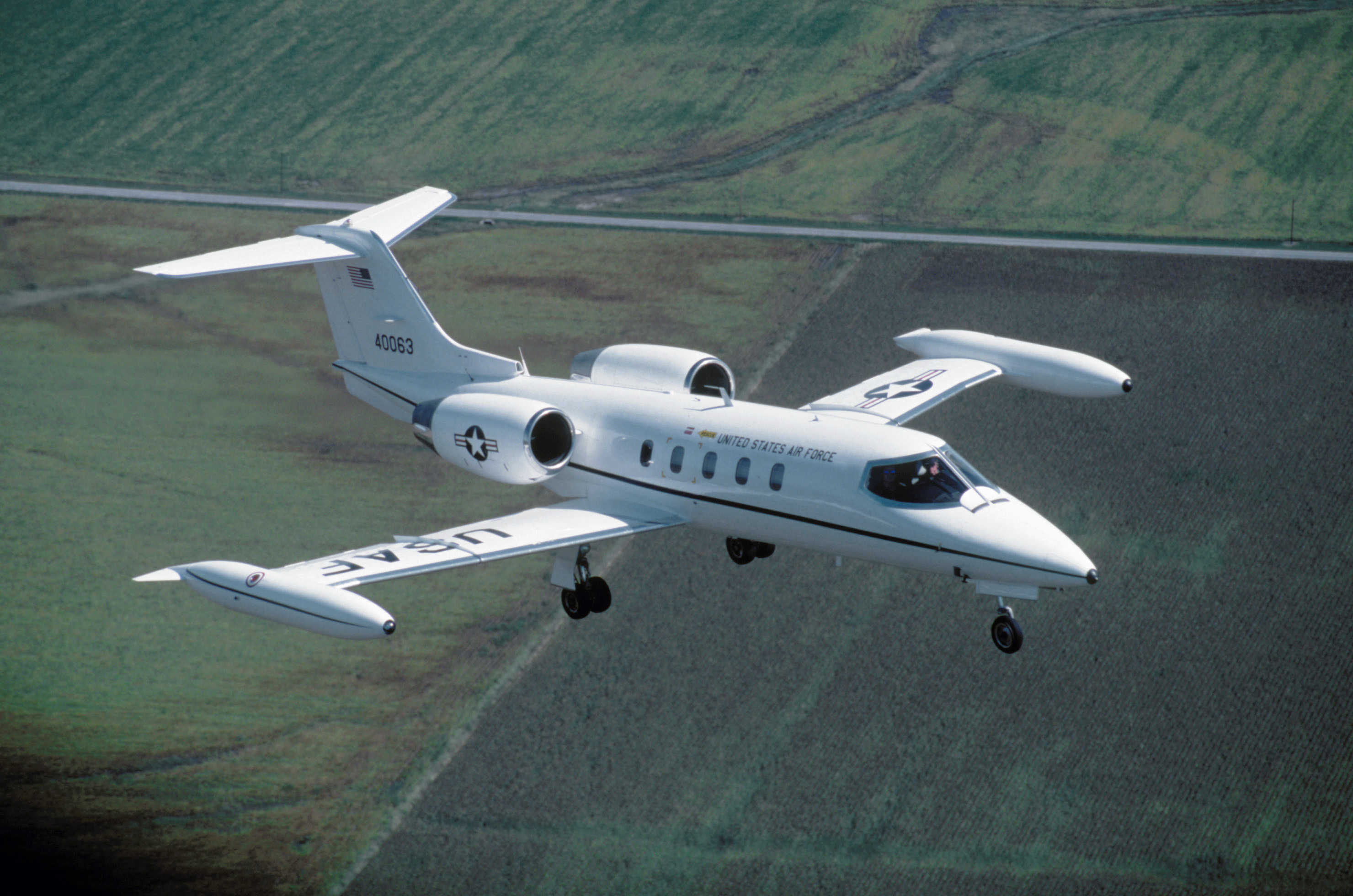
- A squadron C-21 Learjet comes in for a landing at Scott AFB
- Active: 1942–1945; 1949–1951; 1966–1972; 1975–2019
- Country: United States
- Branch: United States Air Force
- Role: Airlift
- Motto: The Wings of Command
- Engagements: Pacific Ocean Theater; Vietnam War
- Decorations: Distinguished Unit Citation; Presidential Unit Citation; Air Force Outstanding Unit Award with Combat "V" Device; Air Force Outstanding Unit Award; Republic of Vietnam Gallantry Cross with Palm

Insignia
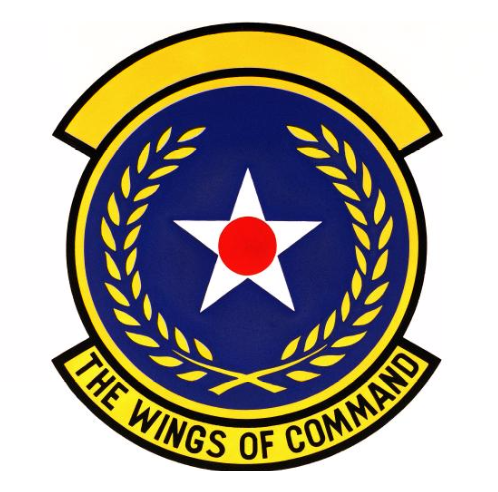
- 457th Airlift Squadron emblem (Note: Approved 20 July 1984. Description: On a Blue disc with a narrow Yellow border encircled by a stylized Yellow wreath a white star pierced Red all within a narrow Black border.)

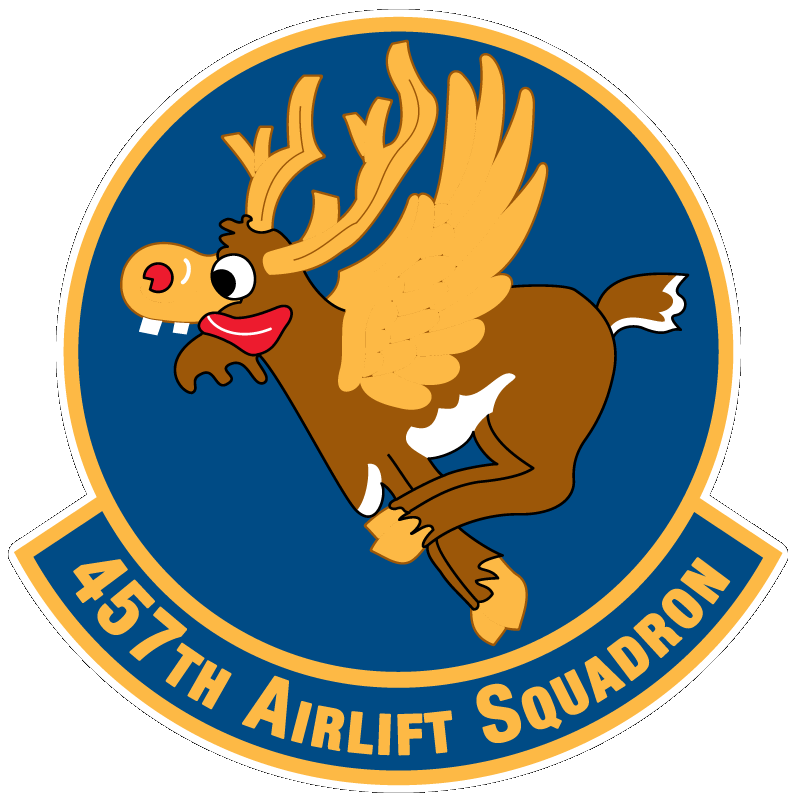
- 457th Tactical Airlift Sq emblem (Note: Approved 3 July 1967.)

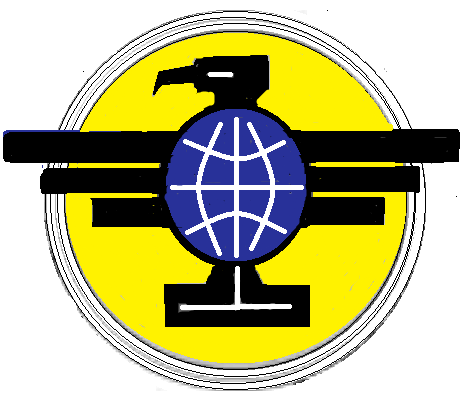
- 457th Bombardment Squadron emblem
- Viet Nam tail code: KA

The 457th Airlift Squadron was an executive airlift unit stationed at Andrews Air Force Base, Maryland. It, and its predecessor, the 1402nd Military Airlift Squadron, operated a number of executive aircraft starting in 1975. From the mid-1990s, the squadron operated only Learjet C-21 aircraft.

The squadron's other predecessor was organized in 1942 as the 457th Bombardment Squadron, a heavy bomber training unit. It was inactivated in the spring of 1944 when the Army Air Forces reorganized its training units on a more flexible basis. The squadron was immediately activated as a Boeing B-29 Superfortress unit. After training in the United States, it deployed to Guam, where it participated in the strategic bombing campaign against Japan, earning two Distinguished Unit Citations. Following V-J Day it remained on Guam until November 1945, when it was inactivated.

The squadron was activated as a corollary unit in the reserve in 1949, serving alongside regular Strategic Air Command units at March Air Force Base. It was mobilized as a result of the Korean War in 1951, but inactivated as its personnel were used to fully man other units. When the reserve began to re-equip with aircraft in 1952, it was briefly activated as the 457th Troop Carrier Squadron, but transferred its personnel and equipment to another unit a month later.

It was organized again in 1967 when the Air Force took over de Havilland Canada C-7 Caribou operations from the Army. It performed theater airlift missions in Viet Nam until inactivating in 1972 as the United States withdrew from Viet Nam. It earned both Presidential Unit Citations and Air Force Outstanding Unit Awards with Combat "V" Device for its combat actions.

== History ==
=== World War II ===
==== Bombardment training unit ====
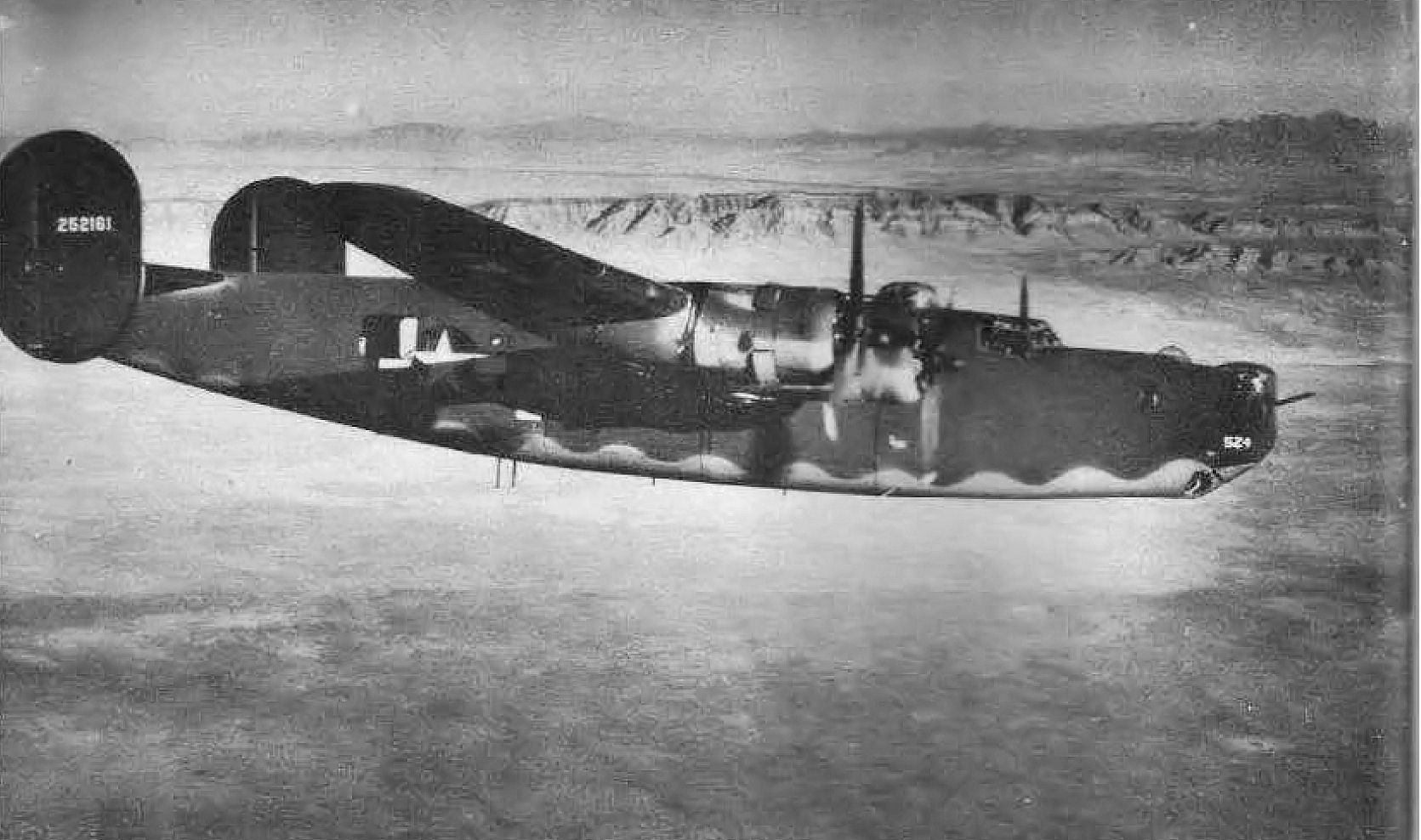
B-24 Liberator 42-52161 from Alamogordo Army Airfield (Note: Aircraft is Ford Motors built Consolidated B-24H-10-FO Liberator, serial 42-52161. It later deployed to Europe and was shot down on 22 February 1944. Missing Aircrew Report 2832.)

The squadron was first activated at Salt Lake City Army Air Base, Utah on 6 July 1942 as one of the original four squadrons of the 330th Bombardment Group. Although equipped early on with some Boeing B-17 Flying Fortresses, it became a Consolidated B-24 Liberator Operational Training Unit (OTU), moving to Biggs Field, Texas by early September. The OTU program was patterned after the unit training system of the Royal Air Force and involved the use of an oversized parent unit to provide cadres to "satellite groups" It then assumed responsibility for their training and oversaw their expansion with graduates of Army Air Forces Training Command schools to become effective combat units. Phase I training concentrated on individual training in crewmember specialties. Phase II training emphasized the coordination for the crew to act as a team. The final phase concentrated on operation as a unit.

By early 1944 most units had been activated and almost three quarters of them had deployed overseas. With the exception of special programs, like forming Boeing B-29 Superfortress units, training “fillers” for existing units became more important than unit training. The squadron then became a Replacement Training Unit (RTU). RTUs were also oversized unit, but their mission was to train individual pilots or aircrews.

However, the Army Air Forces was finding that standard military units like the 457th, whose manning was based on relatively inflexible tables of organization were proving not well adapted to the training mission, even more so to the replacement mission. Accordingly, the Army Air Forces adopted a more functional system in which each base was organized into a separate numbered unit. As a result, the 330th Bombardment Group and its components, including the 457th, along with all supporting units at Biggs were inactivated or disbanded on 1 April 1944 and replaced by the 235th AAF Base Unit (Combat Crew Training School, Bombardment, Very Heavy).

==== B-29 Superfortress operations against Japan ====
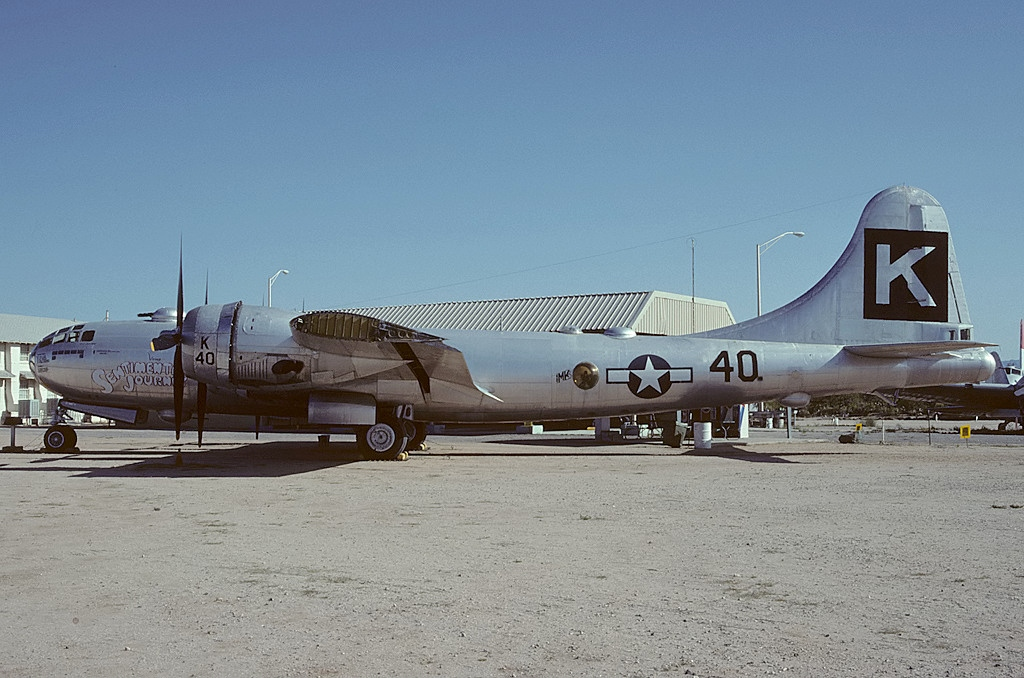
330th Group B-29 Superfortress (Note: Aircraft is Boeing B-29-75-BW Superfortress, serial 44-70016, Sentimental Journey, Quaker City. After the war this aircraft served as a TB-29 radar evaluation plane, Dopey. Transferred to storage in June 1959, this plane is now on display at the Pima Air Museum on loan from the National Museum of the United States Air Force. Baugher, Joe (9 October 2023). "1944 USAF Serial Numbers". Joe Baugher.)

The squadron was activated the same day at Walker Army Air Field, Kansas as a Boeing B-29 unit. While waiting for new B-29s to come off the production line, it again flew B-17 Flying Fortresses for a short time. It trained at Walker and at Dalhart Army Air Field, Texas until January 1945, when it deployed to the Pacific.

The squadron arrived at its combat station, North Field, Guam in the Mariana Islands in early February 1945. Because the results of high altitude B-29 raids on Japan were disappointing. XXI Bomber Command switched to low altitude night area attacks with incendiaries beginning in March 1945. It flew its first combat mission, an attack on the Hodogaya chemical plant in Koriyama, Japan on 12 April 1945.

During April and May 1945, the squadron was diverted from the strategic campaign against Japan to support Operation Iceberg, the invasion of Okinawa. It struck air bases from which kamikaze attacks were being launched. Many of these bases were located on Kyushu, only 300 miles from Okinawa. The attacks directly impacted kamikaze launches, but also forced the Japanese military to retain fighter aircraft to defend the Japanese Special Attack Units that otherwise might have been used to challenge air superiority over Okinawa. (Note: 75% of Twentieth Air Force's missions in April and May 1945 were flown to support Operation Iceberg. Cate & Olson p. 631.)

The squadron resumed attacking urban industrial areas until the end of the war in August 1945. It was awarded a Distinguished Unit Citation (DUC) for incendiary raids on the industrial sections of Tokushima and Gifu and a strike against the hydroelectrical power center at Kofu in July 1945. It received a second DUC for a mission attacking the Nakajima Aircraft Company aircraft engine plant at Musashino near Tokyo in August.

Following V-J Day the squadron dropped food and supplies to Allied prisoners of war and participated in several show of force missions over Japan. It departed the theater in November and was inactivated at Camp Anza, the Port of Embarkation in December 1945.

=== Air Force reserve ===
The May 1949 Air Force Reserve program called for a new type of unit, the Corollary unit, which was a reserve unit integrated with an active duty unit. The plan called for corollary units at 107 locations. It was viewed as the best method to train reservists by mixing them with an existing regular unit to perform duties alongside the regular unit. As part of this program, the 457th was activated at March Air Force Base, California on 27 June 1949 as a corollary of ]Strategic Air Command (SAC)'s 22nd Bombardment Group, which was responsible for the 457th's training. All reserve corollary units were mobilized for the Korean War. The squadron was called to active duty on 1 May 1951. The majority of its personnel were used to bring the 22nd to full strength and the squadron was inactivated on 16 June.

The reserve mobilization for the Korean War had left the reserve without aircraft. In September 1951, Continental Air Command (ConAC) formed the 917th Reserve Training Wing to train reservists at Greater Pittsburgh Airport, Pennsylvania. (Note: The 917th had been activated in 1951 after the reserve 375th Troop Carrier Wing was called to active duty for the Korean War.) Anticipating the return of mission aircraft to reserve units, ConAC replaced the 917th Wing with the 330th Troop Carrier Wing on 14 June 1952. The squadron was redesignated the 457th Troop Carrier Squadron and activated the same day. It is not clear whether the squadron possessed its own aircraft or flew the Curtiss C-46 Commandos of the 2253rd Air Force Reserve Training Center. However, this activation was short lived, as the 330th was replaced by the 375th Troop Carrier Group, which was released from active duty on 14 July 1952, and which had been mobilized at Greater Pittsburgh in 1951. The 457th was inactivated and transferred its personnel to the 55th Troop Carrier Squadron, which was simultaneously activated.

=== Theater airlift in Viet Nam ===
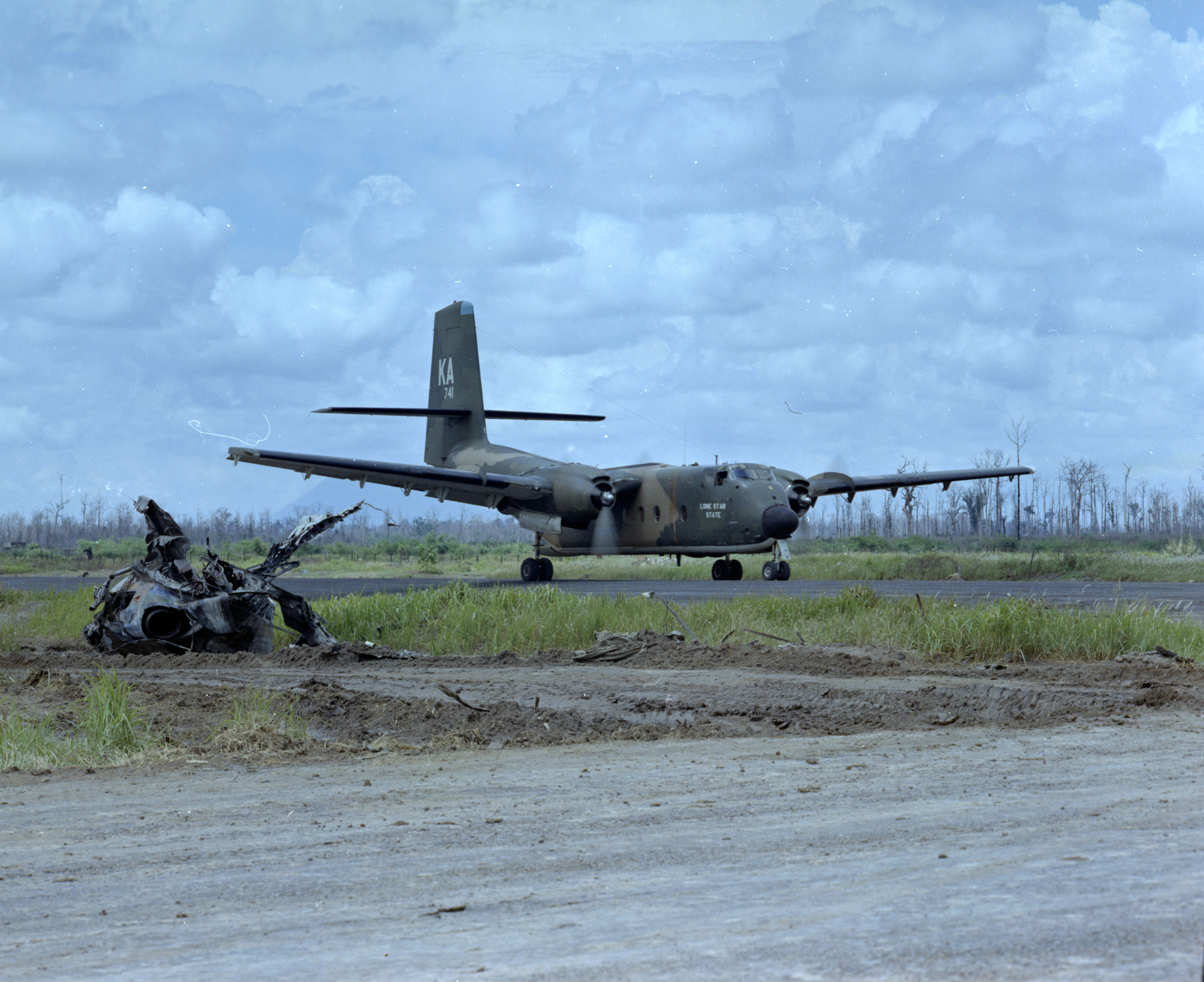
Squadron C-7A Caribou at Katum Camp, Vietnam, in May 1970 (Note: Aircraft is de Haviland Canada C-7B (originally CV-2B) Caribou, serial 63-9741, Lone Star State. It was transferred to the VNAF in June 1972. Baugher, Joe (3 September 2023). "1963 USAF Serial Numbers". Joe Baugher.)

In August 1966, the Air Force and the Army began implementing Project Red Leaf, which would transfer responsibility for the de Havilland Canada C-7 Caribou from the Army to the Air Force following the Johnson-McConnell agreement of 1966. At Can Tho and Soc Trang Airfields, South Vietnam, Air Force personnel began being assigned to the 134th Aviation Company. The Department of Defense had ordered that the 483d Tactical Airlift Wing's new squadrons be located on Air Force installations, not on Army posts, and the cadre of the wing at Cam Ranh Bay Air Base began planning to move squadron level operations from the small Army camps they were operating from to permanent sites when the Air Force units were activated. In December, the company began moving to Cam Ranh Bay Air Base, and on 1 January 1967, the 457th Squadron was organized and took over Caribou operations from the 134th Company.

The squadron provided intratheater airlift to support United States military civic actions, combat support and civic assistance throughout the Republic of Vietnam. This included airland and airdrop assault missions. It also maintained a detachment of two aircraft at Don Muang Air Base, Thailand. In the summer of 1967, the 457th and its sister Caribou squadron at Cam Ranh Bay, the 458th Tactical Airlift Squadron took over Caribou operations at Pleiku Air Base, formerly operated by the 459th Tactical Airlift Squadron. However, a Viet Cong mortar attack on Can Tho on 21 December 1967 that damaged two C-7s, forced a reevaluation of dispersal arrangements and Caribous were withdrawn from Pleiku.

Most missions by the Caribou were airlift flights, with fewer than 2% being airdrops. The squadron experienced an exception to this during the attempt by the North Vietnamese Army to overrun Duc Lap Camp, near the Cambodian border. The camp was manned by half strength Civilian Irregular Defense Group companies, assisted by American special forces. Duc Lap's landing strip was outside its defensive perimeter, and once Communist forces had surrounded the camp and occupied parts of it, airlanding resupplies was out of the question. Airdrops were particularly difficult, as only about 75 square yards remained in friendly force possession. The squadron's pilots approached the camp from random directions, flying at treetop level using strong evasive action due to heavy enemy fire, popping up and leveling off at the minimum altitude for parachutes to open only seconds before the drop was made. The efforts included what is believed to have been the first operational night airdrop by a Caribou. Between 24 and 26 August, C-7s delivered 26 tons of supplies to the besieged camp. After the 26th, reinforcements expanded the area under friendly control and the brunt of further supply was borne by Army Boeing CH-47 Chinook heavy lift helicopters.

In April 1970, the squadron helped break the siege of Dak Seang Special Forces Camp. North Vietnamese forces had surrounded the camp, and learning from the success of air resupply during their 1969 attack on the Ben Het Camp, also established anti-aircraft artillery positions along likely air resupply corridors. On the first day of the siege, two C-7s were diverted from their scheduled missions and staged out of Pleiku to make the first airdrops to the camp. Resupply of the camp was so urgent that all drop-qualified crews of the 483rd Tactical Airlift Wing were ordered to Pleiku to support the operation and eleven sorties were flown that day with cover from Douglas A-1 Skyraiders. Crews approached the camp from the north or south to use terrain to mask their approaches from enemy flak. Loss of the third Caribou in five days, including one from the 457th, prompted a move to resupply the camp with night drops, with cover and illumination provided by Fairchild AC-119 Stinger gunships. All 483rd Wing squadrons participated in the operation. It earned a second Presidential Unit Citation for this action, evacuation of over 2000 refugees from Cambodia, and transportation of the Presidential Southeast Asia Investigation Team to various remote locations in South Vietnam.

The squadron was the last C-7 unit of the 483d Wing to inactivate, ending operations on 25 March 1972 and transferring most of its equipment to the Republic of Viet Nam Air Force at the end of April 1972 as Cam Ranh Bay prepared for closure with the withdrawal of the United States military from Viet Nam. Seven aircraft, along with aircrew and maintenance personnel, were transferred to the 310th Tactical Airlift Squadron at Tan Son Nhut Airport.

=== Executive airlift ===
The second predecessor of the squadron was activated at Andrews Air Force Base, Maryland on 1 April 1975 as the 1402nd Military Airlift Squadron and assigned to the 89th Military Airlift Wing. The 1402nd was one of the squadrons formed when the Air Force decided to consolidate its administrative airlift fleet under Military Airlift Command. The Air Force also decided the fleet would become all jet, using North American T-39 Sabreliners, although the squadron continued to operate propeller driven Convair VC-131s for another two years. In addition, the T-39s provided newly-graduated Air Force pilots with operational experience before assignment to combat units.

In 1984, the squadron ended its pilot readiness training program and replaced its CT-39s with Learjet C-21s and once again flew the C-12. It supported intratheater airlift in Southwest Asia from August 1990 through April 1991. In 1993, its mission shifted from providing administrative airlift to airlift support for high-ranking dignitaries of the US and foreign governments from, flying only Learjets from 1994. The squadron also supported United States Northern Command during exercises. The squadron was inactivated in a ceremony held on 14 June 2019.

== Lineage ==
457th Airlift Squadron

- Constituted as the 457th Bombardment Squadron (Heavy) on 1 July 1942

Activated on 6 July 1942
Inactivated on 1 April 1944

- Redesignated 457th Bombardment Squadron, Very Heavy and activated on 1 April 1944

Inactivated on 27 December 1945

- Redesignated 457th Bombardment Squadron, Medium on 16 May 1949

Activated in the reserve on 27 June 1949
Ordered to active duty on 1 May 1951
Inactivated on 16 June 1951

- Redesignated 457th Troop Carrier Squadron, Medium on 26 May 1952

Activated in the reserve on 14 June 1952
Inactivated on 14 July 1952

- Redesignated 457th Troop Carrier Squadron and activated on 12 October 1966 (not organized)

Organized on 1 January 1967
Redesignated 457th Tactical Airlift Squadron on 1 August 1967
Inactivated on 30 April 1972

- Consolidated with the 1402d Military Airlift Squadron on 1 December 1991 as the 457th Airlift Squadron

Inactivated c. 14 June 2019

1402nd Military Airlift Squadron

- Designated as the 1402nd Military Airlift Squadron and activated on 1 April 1975
- Consolidated with the 457th Tactical Airlift Squadron on 1 December 1991 as the 457th Airlift Squadron

=== Assignments ===
- 330th Bombardment Group, 6 July 1942 – 1 April 1944
- 330th Bombardment Group, 1 April 1944 – 27 December 1945
- 330th Bombardment Group, 27 June 1949 – 16 June 1951
- 330th Troop Carrier Group, 14 June – 14 July 1952
- Pacific Air Forces, 12 October 1966 (not organized)
- 483rd Troop Carrier Wing (later 483rd Tactical Airlift Wing), 1 January 1967 – 1 March 1972
- 89th Military Airlift Wing, 1 April 1975
- 375th Aeromedical Airlift Wing (later 375th Military Airlift Wing), 15 March 1978
- 89th Operations Group, 1 December 1991 – 1 April 1995
- 375th Operations Group, 1 April 1995 – c. 14 June 2019

=== Components ===
- 12th Airlift Flight, 1 April 1997 – 31 July 2005 (Langley Air Force Base, Virginia)
- 47th Airlift Flight, 1 April 1997 – 30 September 2004 (Wright-Patterson Air Force Base, Ohio)
- 54th Airlift Flight, 1 April 1997 – 30 September 2004 (Maxwell Air Force Base, Alabama)

=== Stations ===
- Salt Lake City Army Air Base, Utah, 6 July 1942
- Alamogordo Army Air Field, New Mexico, 1 August 1942
- Biggs Field, Texas, c. 2 September 1942
- Alamogordo Army Air Field, New Mexico, 29 November 1942
- Biggs Field, Texas, 5 April 1943 – 1 April 1944
- Walker Army Air Field, Kansas, 1 April 1944
- Dalhart Army Air Field, Texas, 25 May 1944
- Walker Army Air Field, Kansas, 1 August 1944 – 7 January 1945
- North Field, Guam, Mariana Islands, 18 February – 19 November 1945
- Camp Anza, California, c. 19–27 December 1945
- March Air Force Base, California, 27 June 1949 – 16 June 1951
- Greater Pittsburgh Airport, Pennsylvania, 14 June – 14 July 1952
- Cam Ranh Bay Air Base, South Vietnam, 1 January 1966 – 30 April 1972
- Andrews Air Force Base, Maryland, 1 April 1975 – c. 14 June 2019

=== Aircraft operated ===
- Boeing B-17 Flying Fortress (1942, 1944)
- Consolidated B-24 Liberator (1942–1944)
- Boeing B-29 Superfortress (1944–1945, 1949–1951)
- de Havilland Canada C-7 Caribou (1967–1972)
- North American T-39 Sabreliner (later CT-39) (1975–1984)
- Convair VC-131 (1975–1977)
- Beechcraft C-12 Huron (1976–1977, 1984–1994)
- Learjet C-21 (1984–2019)c. 14 June 2019

=== Awards and campaigns ===
Award streamer	Award	Dates	Notes
	Distinguished Unit Citation	3–9 July 1945	Japan, 457th Bombardment Squadron
	Distinguished Unit Citation	8 August 1945	Tokyo, 457th Bombardment Squadron
	Presidential Unit Citation	21 January – 12 May 1968	Southeast Asia, 457th Tactical Airlift Squadron
	Presidential Unit Citation	1 April – 30 June 1970	Southeast Asia, 457th Tactical Airlift Squadron
	Presidential Unit Citation (Navy)	20 January – 1 April 1968	Vietnam, 457th Tactical Airlift Squadron
	Air Force Outstanding Unit Award with Combat "V" Device	1 January – 30 April 1967	457th Troop Carrier Squadron
	Air Force Outstanding Unit Award with Combat "V" Device	1 May 1967 – 30 April 1968	457th Troop Carrier Squadron (later 457th Tactical Airlift Squadron)
	Air Force Outstanding Unit Award with Combat "V" Device	1 July 1970 – 31 December 1971	457th Tactical Airlift Squadron
	Air Force Outstanding Unit Award	1 July – 31 December 1975	1402nd Military Airlift Squadron
	Air Force Outstanding Unit Award	1 January 1976 – 31 January 1977	1402nd Military Airlift Squadron
	Air Force Outstanding Unit Award	1 June 1981 – 31 May 1982	1402nd Military Airlift Squadron
	Air Force Outstanding Unit Award	1 June 1982 – 30 June 1983	1402nd Military Airlift Squadron
	Air Force Outstanding Unit Award	1 June 1986 – 31 July 1988	1402nd Military Airlift Squadron
	Air Force Outstanding Unit Award	1 July 1991 – 30 June 1992	1402nd Military Airlift Squadron (later 457th Airlift Squadron)
	Air Force Outstanding Unit Award	1 July 1992 – 30 June 1994	457th Airlift Squadron
	Air Force Outstanding Unit Award	1 July 1994 – 30 June 1996	457th Airlift Squadron
	Air Force Outstanding Unit Award	1 June 1998 – 31 May 2000	457th Airlift Squadron
	Air Force Outstanding Unit Award	1 June 2003 – 31 May 2005	457th Airlift Squadron
	Air Force Outstanding Unit Award	1 June 2006 – 31 May 2008	457th Airlift Squadron
	Vietnamese Gallantry Cross with Palm	1 January 1967 – 30 April 1972 (Note: Per Endicott. The AF Personnel Center lists three separate awards of the Gallantry Cross.)	457th Troop Carrier Squadron (later 457th Tactical Airlift Squadron)

Campaign Streamer	Campaign	Dates	Notes
	American Theater without inscription	6 July 1942 – 1 April 1944, 1 April 1944 – 7 January 1945	457th Bombardment Squadron
	Air Offensive, Japan	18 February 1945 – 2 September 1945	457th Bombardment Squadron
	Western Pacific	17 April 1945 – 2 September 1945	457th Bombardment Squadron
	Vietnam Air Offensive	1 January 1966 – 8 March 1967	457th Troop Carrier Squadron
	Vietnam Air Offensive, Phase II	9 March 1967 – 31 March 1968	457th Troop Carrier Squadron (later 457th Tactical Airlift Squadron)
	Vietnam Air/Ground 1968	22 January 1968 – 7 July 1968	457th Tactical Airlift Squadron
	Vietnam Air Offensive, Phase III	1 April 1968 – 31 October 1968	457th Tactical Airlift Squadron
	Vietnam Air Offensive, Phase IV	1 November 1968 – 22 February 1969	457th Tactical Airlift Squadron
	Tet 1969/Counteroffensive	23 February 1969 – 8 June 1969	457th Tactical Airlift Squadron
	Vietnam Summer-Fall 1969	9 June 1969 – 31 October 1969	457th Tactical Airlift Squadron
	Vietnam Winter-Spring 1970	3 November 1969 – 30 April 1970	457th Tactical Airlift Squadron
	Sanctuary Counteroffensive	1 May 1970 – 30 June 1970	457th Tactical Airlift Squadron
	Southwest Monsoon	1 July 1970 – 30 November 1970	457th Tactical Airlift Squadron
	Commando Hunt V	1 December 1970 – 14 May 1971	457th Tactical Airlift Squadron
	Commando Hunt VI	15 May 1971 – 31 July 1971	457th Tactical Airlift Squadron
	Commando Hunt VII	1 November 1971 – 29 March 1972	457th Tactical Airlift Squadron

== See also ==
- List of United States Air Force airlift squadrons
- List of B-29 Superfortress operators
- B-24 Liberator units of the United States Army Air Forces
