= C40 =

C40, or variants thereof, may refer to:

- C40 Cities Climate Leadership Group, a group of 97 cities around the world
- King's Knight Opening (ECO: C40), a chess opening
- Yamaha C40, a guitar

== Aircraft ==
- Cierva C.40, a British autogyro designed by G.B.L. Ellis, Otto Reder, and J.A.J Bennett
- Boeing C-40 Clipper, a military version of the Boeing 737-700C airline transport
- Lockheed Model 12 Electra Junior (US military designation: C-40), an eight-seat, six-passenger all-metal twin-engine transport aircraft

== Automotive ==
- New Flyer High Floor (30200-lb variant: C40), a line of conventional (high-floor) transit buses
- Volvo C40, an all electric subcompact luxury crossover SUV
