= 310th Special Operations Squadron =

American military unit

310th Special Operations Squadron

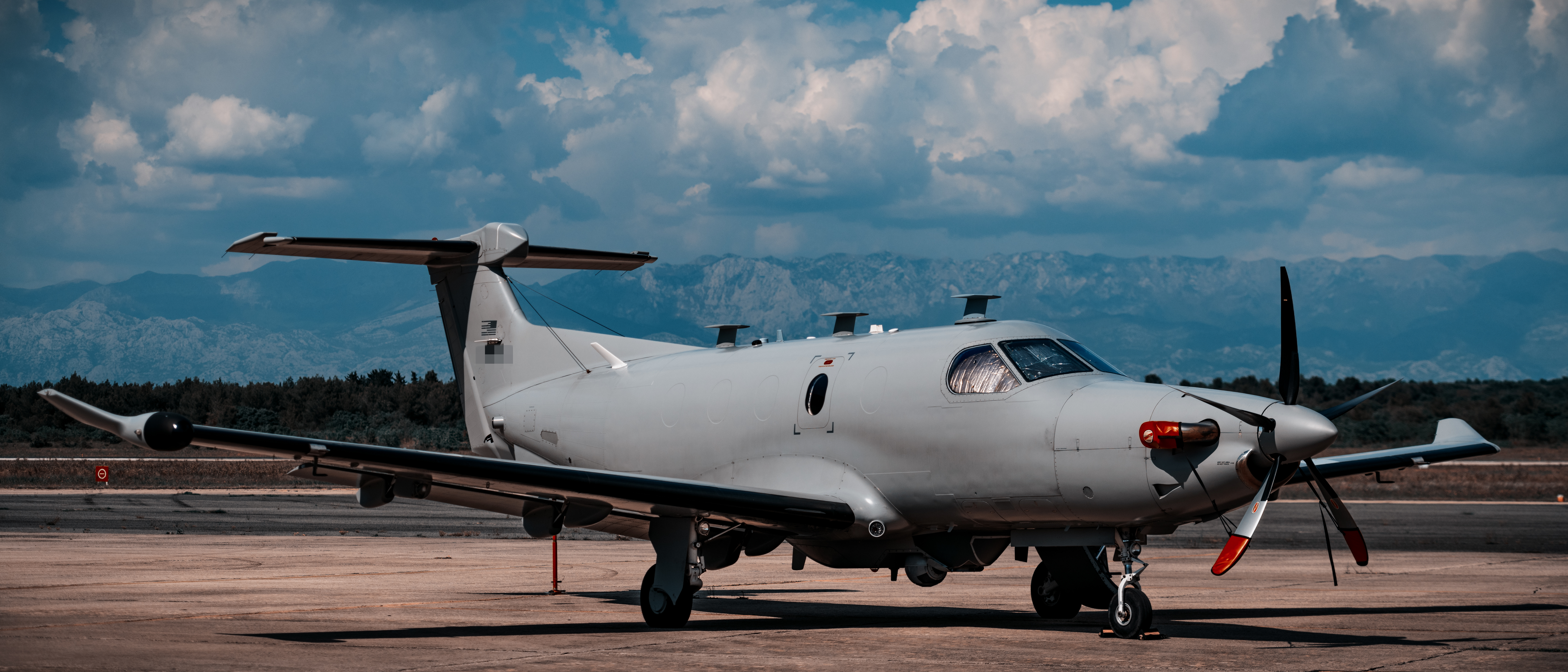
- Squadron U-28A Dracos on the flight line at 93rd Air Base, Croatia, during Exercise Trojan Footprint 22
- Active: 1943–1945; 1949–1953; 1955–1956; 1963–1972; 1984–1999; 2001–2019; 2021–present
- Country: United States
- Branch: United States Air Force
- Role: Special operations
- Part of: Air Force Special Operations Command
- Garrison/HQ: Cannon AFB, New Mexico
- Motto(s): Libertatem Sustenimus (Latin for 'We Sustain Liberty')
- Engagements: Operation Overlord; Operation Market Garden; Operation Plunder; Battle of Khe Sanh
- Decorations: Distinguished Unit Citation; Presidential Unit Citation; Air Force Outstanding Unit Award with Combat "V" Device; Air Force Outstanding Unit Award; Republic of Vietnam Gallantry Cross with Palm

Insignia
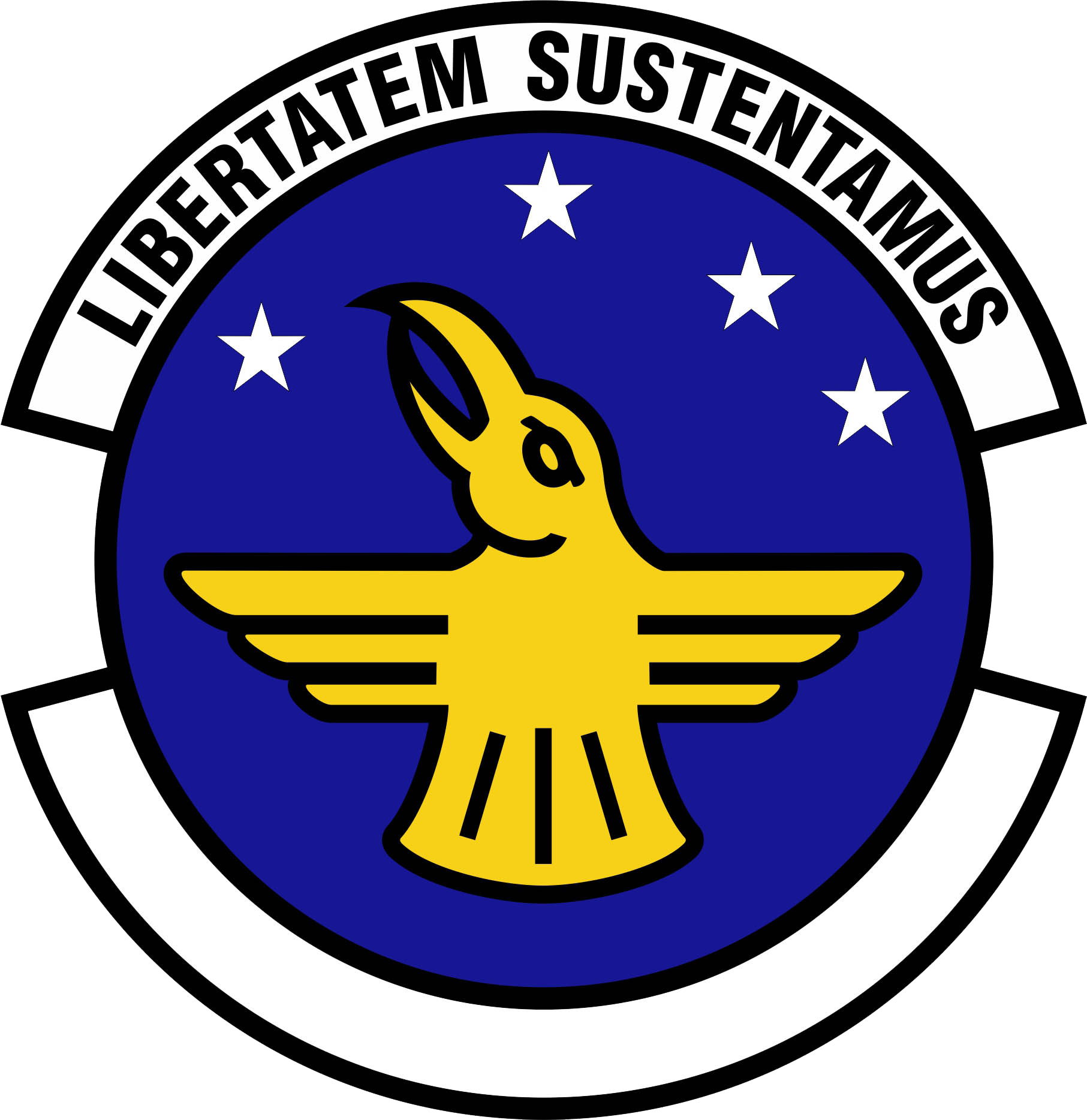
- 310th Special Operations Squadron emblem (Note: Modified 15 April 2019.)

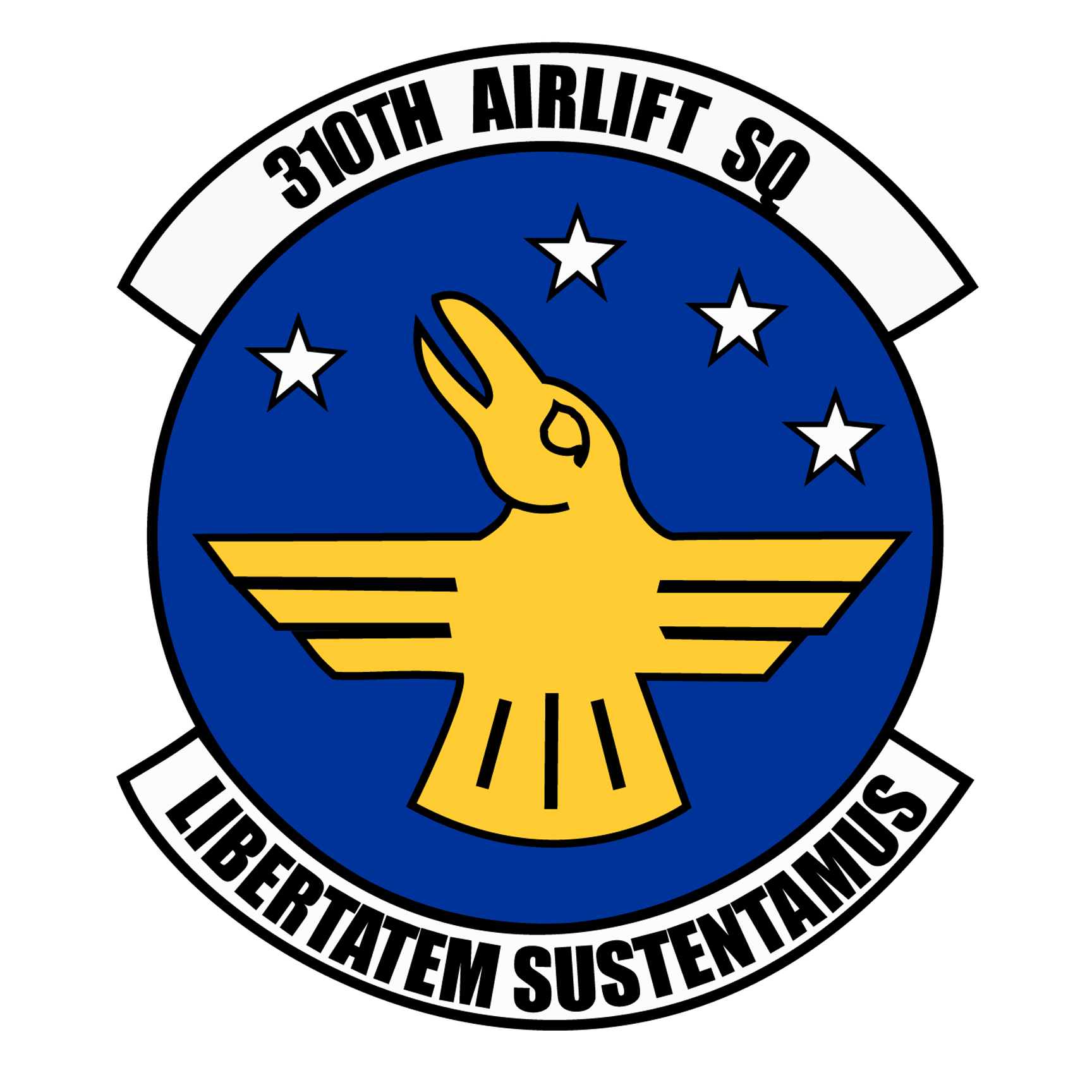
- 310th Airlift Squadron emblem (Note: Approved 7 July 1994.)

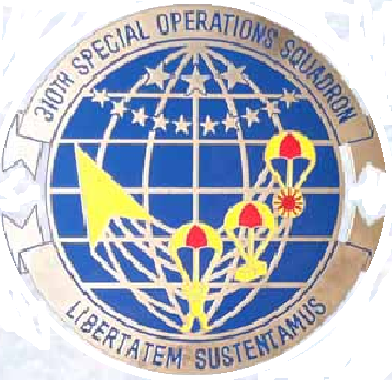
- 310th Air Commando Squadron emblem (Note: Approved 29 September 1965. Description: Azure, a stylized bird rising Or, fimbriated and garnished Sable between four mullets arcing in Chief, three to dexter and one to sinister Argent, all within a diminished bordure of the third [color mentioned].)

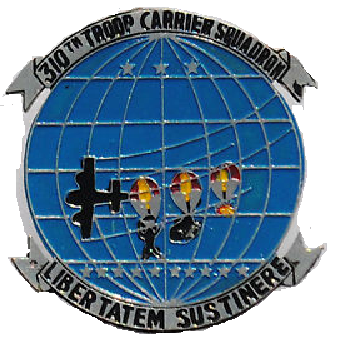
- 310th Troop Carrier Squadron emblem (Note: Approved 11 January 1965.)

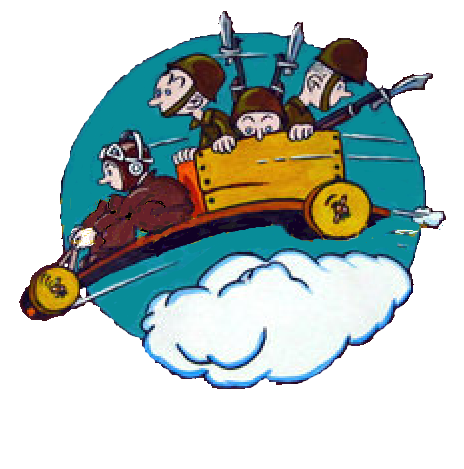
- 310th Troop Carrier Squadron emblem (Note: Approved 13 October 1944. Description: Over and through a light turquoise blue disc, a caricatured soap box scooter yellow, shaded yellow orange, piloted by a small caricatured pilot in brown flight suit, jacket and helmet, having white goggles and ear phones strapped about the head, steering by straps held in the hands, while seated on forward board in soap box, in rear three caricatured paratroopers peering over edges and holding rifles with fixed bayonets, all proper, all zooming over large white cloud formation in sinister base and emitting white speed lines to rear.)

The 310th Special Operations Squadron is an active United States Air Force unit, based at Cannon Air Force Base, New Mexico. It was most recently activated in 2021 as part of the 27th Special Operations Group, flying the U-28A for Air Force Special Operations Command.

The squadron was first activated during World War II as the 310th Troop Carrier Squadron. After training in the United States, the squadron deployed to the European Theater of Operations. It participated in combat and airlift operations until V-E Day, earning a Distinguished Unit Citation for its actions on D-Day. Following the end of hostilities, it participated in the airlift of American troops back to the United States until inactivating in Trinidad in the summer of 1945.

The 310th was activated again in the reserve in June 1949. It was mobilized for the Korean War and performed airlift missions until February 1953, when it was released from active duty and inactivated. From February 1955 to September 1956, the squadron served as a helicopter unit in a trial of the Air Force using rotary wing aircraft to support the Army It was activated again in 1963 in the early buildup of American forces for the Vietnam War It served under several designations until the withdrawal of American forces from Vietnam in 1972, earning a number of decorations for its actions.

In 1984, the squadron was activated as the 310th Military Airlift Squadron in the Panama Canal Zone. It provided airlift throughout South and Central America, including participation in Operation Just Cause until inactivating with the withdrawal of United States forces from Panama in 1999.

== History ==
=== World War II ===
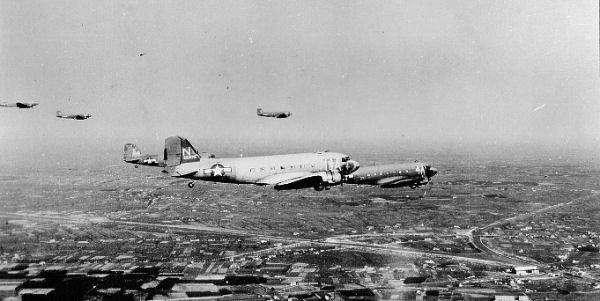
315th Troop Carrier Group C-47s

It was established in early 1942 as a Douglas C-47 Skytrain transport squadron under First Air Force, and later trained under I Troop Carrier Command in the eastern United States. It was deployed to England in December 1942, being assigned to Eighth Air Force to provide transport and resupply support to the buildup of the heavy bomber force in England.

The squadron was detached to Twelfth Air Force in Algeria in May 1943 to provide air resupply and transport during the North African Campaign in Algeria and Tunisia. It also performed combat casualty evacuation of wounded personnel to rear areas. It remained under jurisdiction of VIII ASC while in North Africa, providing transport between England and North Africa from its base in Algeria. It returned to England in early 1944 to participate in the buildup of forces prior to the Allied landings in France during D-Day in June 1944.

The squadron engaged in combat operations by dropping paratroops into Normandy on D-Day (6 June 1944) and releasing gliders with reinforcements on the following day. The unit received a Distinguished Unit Citation and a French citation for these missions.

After the Normandy invasion the squadron ferried supplies in the United Kingdom. It also hauled food, clothing, medicine, gasoline, ordnance equipment, and other supplies to the front lines and evacuated patients to rear zone hospitals. It dropped paratroops near Nijmegen and towed gliders carrying reinforcements during the Operation Market Garden. In December, it participated in the Battle of the Bulge by releasing gliders with supplies for the 101st Airborne Division near Bastogne.

The squadron moved to Belgium in early 1945, and participated in the Western Allied invasion of Germany, participating in the air assault across the Rhine River in March 1945, each aircraft towed two gliders with troops of the 17th Airborne Division and released them near Wesel.

In late May 1945, after V-E Day, the squadron moved to Waller Field, Trinidad and attached to Air Transport Command. From Trinidad, the squadron ferried returning military personnel to Morrison Field, Florida, where they were sent on to other bases or prepared for separation after the war. It was inactivated at the end of July 1945.

=== Air Force reserve ===
It was reactivated in 1949 as a reserve troop carrier squadron. It was equipped with Curtiss C-46 Commandos. activated during the Korean War and became a training unit for crews flying Fairchild C-119 Flying Boxcar assault transports in South Korea. It was inactivated in 1953 after federalized activation period ended. The squadron was reactivated a year later operating variety of rotary wing helicopters. It provided helicopter support for atomic weapons tests on Bikini in the Eniwetok Atoll, February–June 1956. It was inactivated when the helicopter mission was transferred to the United States Army.

=== Vietnam War ===
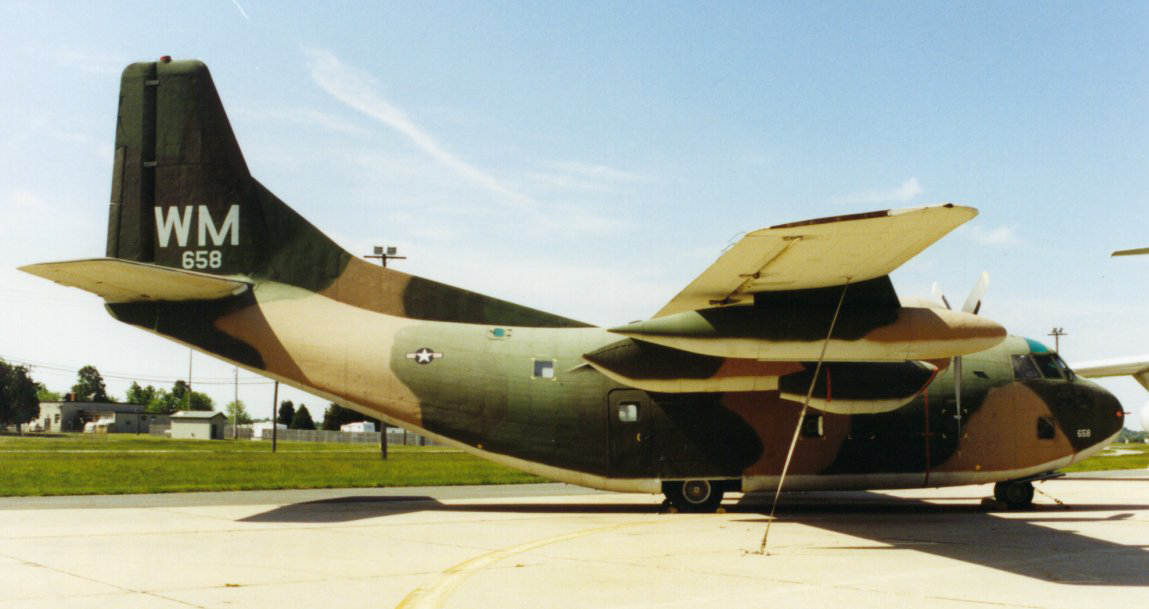
C-123K in 310th Air Commando Squadron markings

The squadron was reactivated again in 1963 as a Fairchild C-123 Provider combat resupply squadron, used in remote combat airfield resupply and casualty evacuation of ground forces. It was deployed to South Vietnam after training and operated under 2d Air Division, Pacific Air Forces to support advisory units, primarily in Operation Mule Train combat cargo missions in South Vietnam to support special forces in the early stages of US Involvement in the Vietnam War. It was re-designated an Air Commando squadron in 1965 under Seventh Air Force, engaged in special operations and tactical airlift during 1965–1970 based at Phan Rang Air Base flying intratheater combat cargo and troop carrier missions.

The squadron moved from Phan Rang to Tan Son Nhut Airport in January 1972 when Phan Rang was turned over to South Vietnamese. When the 457th Tactical Airlift Squadron ended de Havilland Canada C-7 Caribou operations at Cam Ranh Bay Air Base in late March, its remaining aircrews and seven Caribous were transferred to the 310th for special airlift tasking and training of VNAF aircrews in the Caribou. Several of the transferred planes had been modified in 1971 to perform tactical radio relay missions. At the beginning of the Easter Offensive in April, these planes maintained around the clock radio relay orbits over Tan Son Nhut, adding a similar orbit over Da Nang Air Base a few days later. These missions continued until mid-May 1972. It remained in the country supporting last combat forces in South Vietnam until it was inactivated in November 1972.

=== Special operations in Latin America ===
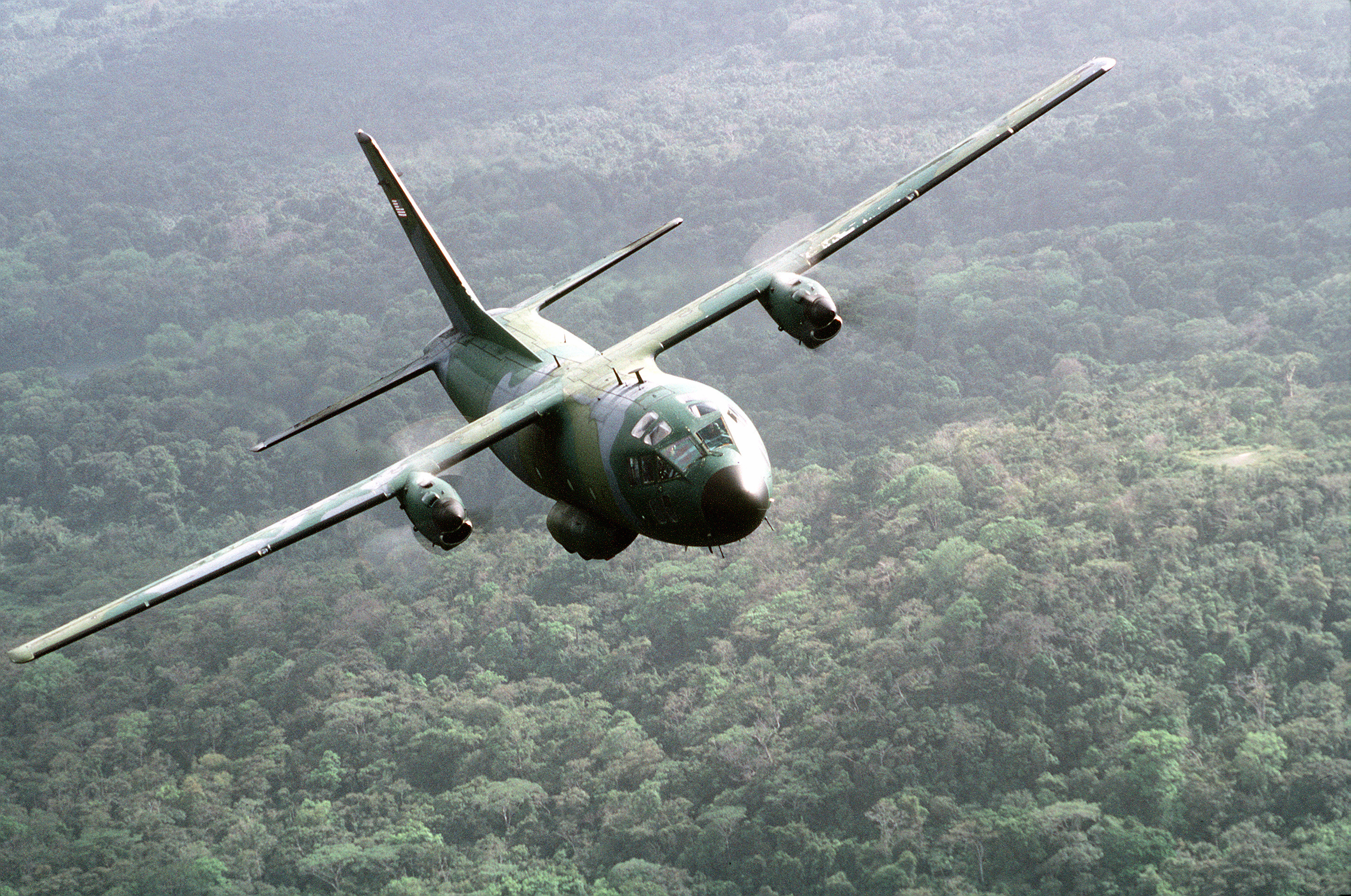
310th Airlift Squadron C-27A over Panama

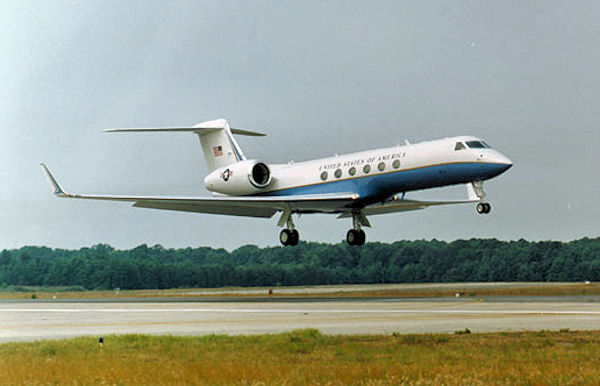
C-37 Gulfstream V as flown by the 310th Airlift Squadron in 2008

The squadron flew airlift missions in South and Central America from 1985 to 1999, including support for Operation Just Cause, December 1989 to January 1990, until its inactivation in March 1999. On 24 April 1992 two Peruvian Sukhoi Su-22 fighters attacked and heavily damaged a squadron C-130 Hercules flying an Air Bridge Denial Program anti-drug mission in international airspace. Captain Pete B. Eunice still managed a safe landing. For that effort, the C-130 crew earned the 1992 Mackay Trophy. This highly classified anti-drug surveillance mission remains controversial even today. One airman was killed, and others were wounded onboard the aircraft during the attack.

=== VIP transport ===
In 2001, the squadron was reactivated as part of the redesignated 6th Air Mobility Wing at MacDill Air Force Base, Florida, where it flew the C-37A Gulfstream V. In 2013, the unit received a United States Central Command deployment tasking to provide combat airlift to the Commander, International Security Assistance Force at Kabul International Airport. This tasking represented the DOD's first deployment of the C-37 to a combat zone. The 310th successfully completed two subsequent deployments that year.

On 1 July 2019, the C-37As were reassigned to other bases and the squadron was inactivated a few months later on 30 September 2019.

The squadron will relocate to Will Rogers Air National Guard Base in the future.

=== Operations and decorations ===
- Combat operations. Airborne assaults on Normandy, the Netherlands, and Germany, as well as aerial transportation in ETO, during World War II. Awarded Distinguished Unit Citation (DUC) for service at Normandy, 5–6 June 1944. Helicopter support for atomic weapons tests (Operation RED WING) on the Bikini and Eniwetok atolls in the Marshall Islands, Feb–June 1956. Airdrop and airlift to combat forces in Southeast Asia, 1963–1972; also vegetation destruction and malaria control flights, August 1970 – June 1972. Awarded Presidential Unit Citations (PUCs) for service in Vietnam, 21 January-12 May 1968; 1 April-30 June 1970. Airlift in South and Central America, 1985–1999, including the invasion of Panama (Operation JUST CAUSE), December 1989 – January 1990. Airlifted combatant commanders, government and military official throughout the US and worldwide in support of Global War on Terrorism (GWOT), 2001 – present
- Campaigns. World War II: Normandy; Northern France; Rhineland; Central Europe. Vietnam: Vietnam Advisory; Vietnam Defensive; Vietnam Air; Vietnam Air Offensive; Vietnam Air Offensive, Phase II; Vietnam Air Offensive, Phase III; Vietnam Air/Ground; Vietnam Air Offensive, Phase IV; TET 69/ Counteroffensive; Vietnam Summer/Fall, 1969; Vietnam Winter/Spring, 1970; Sanctuary Counteroffensive; Southwest Monsoon; Commando Hunt V; Commando Hunt VI; Commando Hunt VII; Vietnam Ceasefire.
- Decorations. Distinguished Unit Citation: Normandy, 5–6 June 1944. Presidential Unit Citations: Vietnam, 21 January-12 May 1968; 1 April-30 June 1970. Navy Presidential Unit Citation: Khe Sanh, 20 January-31 March 1968. Air Force Outstanding Unit Awards with Combat "V" Device: [8 July] 1963-30 April 1965; 30 June-9 July 1965; 15 October 1966 – 30 April 1967; 10 June-31 December 1967; 15 July 1968 – 30 June 1969; 1 January 1971 – 26 January 1972; 27 January-15 November 1972. Air Force Outstanding Unit Awards: 1 December 1984 – 30 June 1986; 1 July 1986 – 30 June 1988; 1 July 1988 – 30 June 1989; 20 December 1989 – 14 February 1991; 11 February 1992 – 31 July 1993; 1 June 1996 – 31 May 1998. Republic of Vietnam Gallantry Crosses with Palm: 22 April 1966 – 1 January 1970; 1 January 1970 – 15 November 1972.

== Lineage ==
- Constituted as the 310th Troop Carrier Squadron on 25 May 1943

Activated on 1 October 1943
Inactivated on 31 July 1945

- Redesignated 310th Troop Carrier Squadron, Medium on 10 May 1949

Activated in the Reserve on 27 June 1949
Ordered to active service on 1 May 1951
Inactivated on 1 February 1953

- Redesignated 310th Troop Carrier Squadron, Assault, Rotary Wing on 16 November 1954

Activated on 8 February 1955
Inactivated on 7 September 1956

- Redesignated: 310th Troop Carrier Squadron, Assault and activated on 24 May 1963 (not organized)

Organized on 8 July 1963
Redesignated 310th Air Commando Squadron, Troop Carrier on 8 March 1965
Redesignated 310th Air Commando Squadron, Tactical Airlift on 1 August 1967
Redesignated 310th Special Operations Squadron on 1 August 1968
Redesignated 310th Tactical Airlift Squadron on 1 January 1970
Inactivated on 15 November 1972

- Redesignated 310th Military Airlift Squadron and activated on 1 December 1984

Redesignated 310th Airlift Squadron on 1 June 1992
Inactivated on 31 March 1999

- Activated on 1 January 2001

Inactivated on 30 September 2019

- Redesignated as 310th Special Operations Squadron on 16 Mar 2021

Activated on 30 Apr 2021

=== Assignments ===
- 443d Troop Carrier Group, 1 October 1943
- I Troop Carrier Command, 15 February 1944
- Eighth Air Force, 21 April 1944
- 315th Troop Carrier Group, 26 April 1944 – 31 July 1945
- 443d Troop Carrier Group, 27 June 1949 – 1 February 1953
- Eighteenth Air Force

Attached to 464th Troop Carrier Wing, 8 February 1955 – 7 September 1956

- Pacific Air Forces, 24 May 1963
- 315th Troop Carrier Group (later 315th Air Commando) Group), 8 July 1963
- 315th Air Commando Wing (later 315th Special Operations Wing, 315th Tactical Airlift Wing), 8 March 1966
- 377th Combat Support Group (later 377th Air Base Wing), 15 January – 15 November 1972
- 61st Military Airlift Group, 1 December 1984
- 24th Operations Group, 1 June 1992
- Twenty-First Air Force, 1 October 1997 – 31 March 1999
- 6th Operations Group, 1 January 2001 – 30 September 2019
- 27th Special Operations Group, 30 April 2021 – present

=== Stations ===
- Sedalia Army Air Field, Missouri, 1 October 1943
- Alliance Army Air Field, Nebraska, 19 January 1944
- Camp Mackall, North Carolina, 8 March – 21 April 1944
- RAF Spanhoe (AAF-493), England, 21 April 1944
- Amiens Airfield (B-48), France, 6 April – May 1945
- Waller Field, Trinidad, May-31 July 1945
- Hensley Field, Texas, 27 June 1949
- Donaldson Air Force Base, South Carolina, 9 August 1951 – 1 February 1953
- Pope Air Force Base, North Carolina 8 February 1955 – 7 September 1956
- Tan Son Nhut Airport, South Vietnam, 8 July 1963
- Nha Trang Airport (later Nha Trang Air Base), South Vietnam, 29 June 1965
- Phan Rang Air Base, South Vietnam, 14 July 1967
- Tan Son Nhut Air Base, South Vietnam, 27 January – 15 November 1972
- Howard Air Force Base, Panama, 1 December 1984 – 31 March 1999
- MacDill Air Force Base, Florida, 1 January 2001 – 30 September 2019
- Cannon Air Force Base, New Mexico, 30 April 2021 – present

=== Aircraft ===
- Douglas C-47 Skytrain (1943–1945)
- Curtiss C-46 Commando (1949–1952)
- Fairchild C-119 Flying Boxcar (1952–1953)
- Sikorsky H-19 Chickasaw (1955–1956)
- Fairchild C-123B Provider (1963–1968)
- Fairchild C-123K Provider (1967–1972)
- Fairchild UC-123B Provider (1963–1978)
- Fairchild UC-123K Provider (1968–1972)
- de Havilland Canada C-7 Caribou (1972)
- Boeing C-22 (1985–1991)
- Lockheed C-130 Hercules (1984–1996)
- Learjet C-21 (1989–1999)
- Alenia C-27A Spartan (1991–1999)
- Boeing CT-43 (1992–2001)
- EC-135Y (2001–2003)
- Gulfstream C-37 (2001–2019)
- U-28A (2021–present)

=== Operations ===
- World War II
- Vietnam War
- Operation Just Cause
