= Battle of Kham Duc =

Part of the Vietnam War (1968)

Coordinates: 15°26′17.50″N 107°47′48.85″E

- Part of the May offensive in the Tet Offensive of the Vietnam War
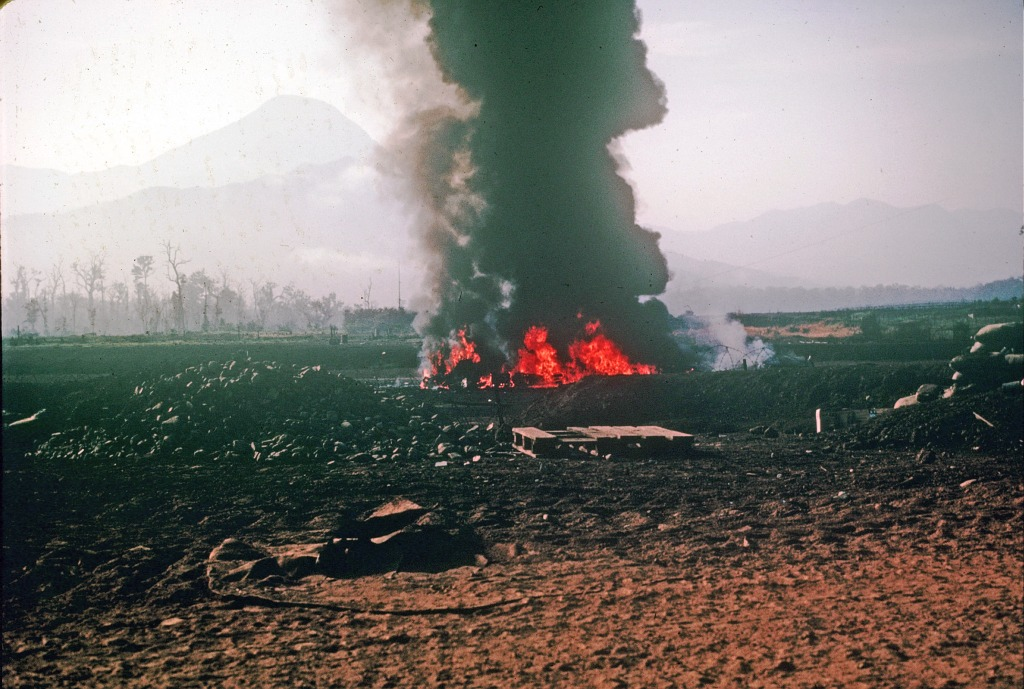
- The United States military lost twelve aircraft during the Battle of Kham Duc, including this CH-47 Chinook that was shot down while attempting to land on the airfield
Date	10–12 May 1968
Location	Khâm Đức District, Quảng Tín Province (now Quảng Nam Province), South Vietnam
Result	North Vietnamese victory

Belligerents
North Vietnam Supported by: Việt Cộng	United States; South Vietnam; Australia

Commanders and leaders
MG Chu Huy Mân; COL Giáp Văn Cương	(United States) GEN William Westmoreland; BG Burl W. McLaughlin; LTC Robert B. Nelson; LTC Daniel Schungel; CPT Robert Henderson (Australia) CPT John White

Units involved
2nd Division: 21st Regiment; 1st 'Ba Gia' Regiment	23rd Infantry Division: 2nd Battalion, 1st Infantry, 196th Light Infantry Brigade; A Company, 1st Battalion, 46th Infantry, 198th Light Infantry Brigade; 5th Special Forces Group: Detachment A-105; C & C Detachment (SOG); 11th MIKE Force; 12th MIKE Force; A Company, 70th Combat Engineer Battalion Battery D, 2nd Battalion, 13th Marine Regiment, 1st Marine Division

Strength
2,500; 3,000-4,000	(United States) 91123rd Infantry Division - 791, 5th SF Group - 120 (Australia) 3 AATTV advisors Battery D, 2nd Battalion, 13th Regiment, 1st Marine Division - 44 (South Vietnam) 266 CIDG soldiers

Casualties and losses
U.S. claim: 345 killed	(United States) 46 killed 112 wounded 33 missing 1 captured 12 aircraft shot down or destroyed (South Vietnam) 10 killed 95 missing
- ~183 civilians killed

The Battle of Kham Duc was a major battle of the Vietnam War. The event occurred in Khâm Đức, now district capital of Khâm Đức District, then in Quảng Tín Province (now part of Quảng Nam Province, Vietnam), from 10–12 May 1968. During the Tet Offensive of 1968, the People's Army of Vietnam (PAVN) 2nd Division tried to capture Đà Nẵng, but they were defeated in the Battle of Lo Giang by elements of the U.S. 1st Marine Division and the 23rd Infantry Division (Americal Division). PAVN General Chu Huy Mân disengaged from the fight on the outskirts of the city, and pulled the 2nd Division into the mountains to rest, rebuild, and prepare for the next major operation. The US and allied defenders of the Special Forces camp at Khâm Đức, a small district in the north of Quảng Tín, were chosen as the next target for the 2nd Division. Although the Special Forces camp had never been an obstacle to the constant infiltration of PAVN troops around it, the North Vietnamese hoped to attract major US reinforcements away from the lowland populated areas, kill or capture them and film the battle, presumably to make it look like a U.S. Điện Biên Phủ on the eve of the 1st Paris peace conference.

Following the 2nd PAVN Division's defeat at Đà Nẵng, U.S. military intelligence agencies in I Corps Tactical Zone were confused by its movements. Beginning in late February, intelligence reports confirmed the presence of large units of the 2nd Division in the Khâm Đức area. Coincidentally, General William Westmoreland sent U.S. Army engineers to upgrade the camp's airstrip for sustained use by large transport aircraft in preparation for an incursion into Laos titled Operation York. An Australian-led indigenous MIKE Force company was ordered to hold their vulnerable position at Ngok Tavak (Ngok Ta Vak), the ruins of a small, earthen French fort on a hill about 8 kilometers (5.0 mi) south of Khâm Đức, to boost Special Forces intelligence-gathering capabilities in the area. More and more reports of patrol contact with elements of the 2nd Division heightened the alert status of the MIKE Force troops.

In the early hours of 10 May, the 40th Battalion attacked Ngok Tavak and overran much of the outpost. By dawn, the 11th MIKE Force company was devastated, but they later received reinforcements from the 12th MIKE Force company. The Australian MIKE Force commander then decided to evacuate his troops and move towards Khâm Đức. The survivors of the PAVN battalion had left behind a mortar squad and a recoilless rifle squad to cover their retreat and harass the remaining MIKE Force and Marine artillery platoon. Meanwhile, a reinforced infantry battalion with an attached artillery battery of the 23rd Infantry Division was airlifted into Khâm Đức as part of Operation Golden Valley, to defend the airstrip in preparation for a possible evacuation. On the morning of 12 May, the day before the Paris peace talks began, both regiments of the 2nd Division attacked Khâm Đức. It began with assaults on two of the three hilltop outposts surrounding the camp. Westmoreland then ordered his Deputy MACV CO for Air, General Momyer, to make an all-out effort to extract all the people in Khâm Đức, both military and civilian. The PAVN mass attacks on the airstrip in broad daylight under clear skies were ravaged by an unprecedented concentration of some 350 sorties of almost 150 U.S. Air Force, Marine, Navy and South Vietnamese tactical aircraft, causing an estimated 1,500 to 2,000 PAVN casualties without allowing them to penetrate, much less overrun, the airstrip or the camp. By the time the operation was completed, about 1,500 military and civilian personnel had been evacuated. For the following two days, U.S. Air Force B-52s bombed the surrounding area intensively, but overall it was considered to be a North Vietnamese victory after the evacuation.

== Background ==
=== The Tet Offensive ===
1968 marked a decisive turning point in the history of the Vietnam War. Towards the end of January, regular units of the PAVN and the VC initiated large-scale attacks on Saigon and all 34 provincial cities of South Vietnam. Several major towns, villages, and allied military installations throughout the country were also attacked during the same period. In doing so, the PAVN and VC violated the Tết holiday truce, which had enabled South Vietnamese military personnel to go on leave. The combined PAVN/VC forces were able to achieve the element of surprise, but despite some early victories, they could only sustain their offensive for a few days, or in the case of the Battle of Huế several weeks, before being ejected with heavy losses.

In I Corps the PAVN had mixed results against allied military forces. On 7 February 1968, PAVN infantry armed with satchel charges, tear gas, and flamethrowers, and reinforced with Soviet-made PT-76 amphibious tanks, successfully seized the Lang Vei Special Forces Camp. At Khe Sanh Combat Base, about 7 kilometers (4.3 mi) east of Lang Vei, the U.S. 26th Marine Regiment was able to hold their ground against a multi-division PAVN assault. During the siege U.S. Air Force (USAF), Navy, and Marine fighter-bombers dropped 40,000 tonnes of bombs on PAVN positions, while B-52 bombers dropped more than 60,000 tonnes of ordnance on areas where the PAVN were believed to have concentrated their forces.

In the same period, the PAVN 2nd Division under the command of Colonel Giáp Văn Cương clashed with elements of the 1st Marine Division, the Americal Division, and the South Korean Marine Brigade in their attempts to capture Đà Nẵng. The PAVN, however, were defeated in the Battle of Lo Giang. After 9 February, the PAVN 2nd Division seemed to withdraw from the battlefield, so Lieutenant General Robert E. Cushman Jr. Commander of III Marine Amphibious Force ordered his troops to continue their attacks on the retreating forces. In the aftermath of the battle for Đà Nẵng, U.S. military commanders in I Corps held disparate views on the fighting ability of the PAVN 2nd Division. Americal Division commander Major General Samuel W. Koster claimed losses sustained by the PAVN 2nd Division had "impaired its future effectiveness", after his units killed more than 1,000 PAVN soldiers in the month of January alone. In contrast, 1st Marine Division commander Major General Donn J. Robertson told his superiors that the 2nd Division may have several uncommitted units they could deploy for future operations.

Whether the PAVN 2nd Division had been rendered ineffective or not was uncertain, as U.S. military intelligence did not know the whereabouts of the enemy unit or their intentions. The PAVN had been fighting continuously since January 1968 with U.S. and other allied military forces in I Corps, so their resupply capabilities were overstretched and their soldiers were not given the opportunity to rest before the Tet Offensive. Thus, following the failed attack on Đà Nẵng, PAVN General Chu Huy Mân, Commander of Military Region 5, made the decision to pull the 2nd Division into the mountains where they could rest, resupply, and integrate replacements before going on the offensive again. Mân ordered Cương to split the 2nd Division into two fighting arms: one regiment would tie down the Americans in the Quế Son Valley, while the rest of the division would withdraw to their base areas near Laos, to link up with the 70th Transport Regiment. Then, their next target would be Khâm Đức and the surrounding areas; Mân told his senior officers that they would attack Khâm Đức to force an American retreat.

=== The plans for Khâm Đức ===
Khâm Đức was in the northern section of Quảng Tín Province, South Vietnam, in I Corps Tactical Zone. It sat beside National Highway 14 (QL 14), which paralleled the international border with Laos, surrounded by high mountains on all sides. The Special Forces Camp was named after the main village which was about 800 meters (2,600 ft) to the northeast, and was constructed about mid-way along a 6,000-foot (1,800 m) asphalt runway. Before his abdication, Emperor Bảo Đại (and possibly Ngô Đình Nhu) had used Khâm Đức as a hunting lodge, so the airfield was constructed there for Bảo Đại's use. The Khâm Đức Special Forces Camp was garrisoned by Detachment A-105, U.S. Army 5th Special Forces Group. The camp was downgraded from a major outpost due to its unpredictable weather and now functioned as a training centre for Civilian Irregular Defense Group program (CIDG) personnel, reconnaissance of enemy movements, and combat operations. The village had 272 inhabitants, most of whom were dependents of the South Vietnamese and ethnic lowland CIDG soldiers. Ngok Tavak, about 7 kilometers (4.3 mi) southwest of Khâm Đức, was an observation outpost for Detachment A-105. Following the loss of Lang Vei, Khâm Đức was the last remaining Special Forces camp adjacent to the Ho Chi Minh Trail in I Corps.

Khâm Đức suffered from a disability that made it less than ideal. The monsoon season, mixing storms from the Pacific Ocean with mountain storms moving east from Laos, meant that visibility was often near zero, rendering air support impossible. The weather is affected by two monsoon seasons. From April until November, northern-eastern monsoons carry moisture from the Gulf of Tonkin to the mountains of the Truong Son range, where it is released in torrential downpours every afternoon. Between May and November, the southern monsoons compete, the wind blowing west to east over the Gulf of Thailand. Even when it wasn't raining, dense fog often precluded flights. It was not at all unusual for flights to Khâm Đức to be grounded for a week or longer until a break in the weather allowed access to the base. PAVN forces were counting on the weather to prevent air support from saving the base. Westmoreland gambled that air support would be possible, saving the lives of the elements deployed there as well as offering an opportunity to inflict massive damage on the attacking forces.

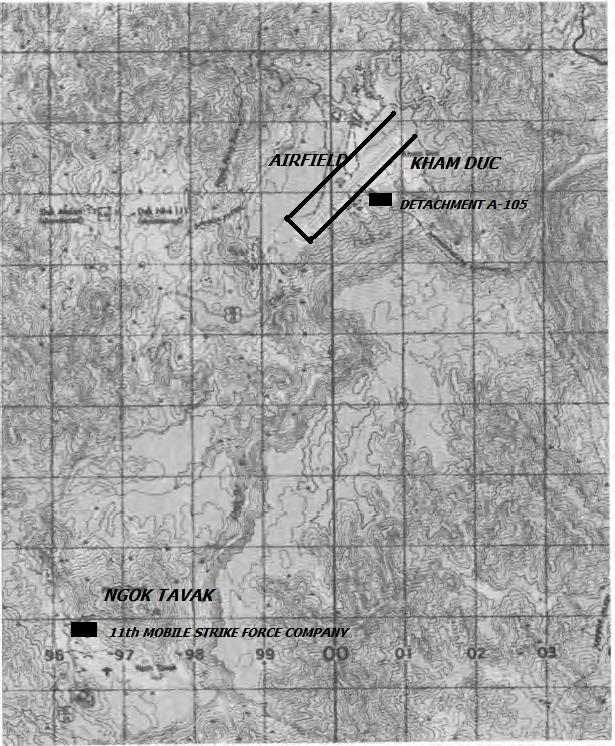
Map of Khâm Đức and Ngok Tavak.

From their base area positioned between Highway 14 and the Đăk Mi River, elements of the PAVN 2nd Division planned their attack on Khâm Đức and the surrounding outposts. The 1st Regiment, commanded by Lieutenant Colonel Nguyễn Chơn, was to lead the attack, including sweeping aside the small outpost of Ngok Tavak (Ngok Ta Vak). The PAVN remained hidden to avoid detection by the South Vietnamese and their American allies. Consequently, during that period the GK.31 Anti-Aircraft Battalion was prohibited from opening fire on U.S. reconnaissance aircraft that flew over their area. At the same time, the GK.40 Engineer Battalion was told to conduct training on its new equipment—satchel charges, tear gas, and flamethrowers—before early-May 1968. The 1st Regiment Headquarters made their preparations for the initial attack by regularly sending out CIDG units to conduct reconnaissance patrols around Ngok Tavak to observe enemy activities in the area.

Throughout March and April, allied intelligence was baffled by the movements of the units belonging to the PAVN 2nd Division, and that was reflected in the information obtained by U.S. military forces. For example, the U.S. 1st Marine Division reported that the 2nd Division Headquarters, the 3rd Regiment, the 21st Regiment, and the 1st Regiment were in the vicinity of Khâm Đức, Thượng Đức and Hội An, respectively. In contrast, information released by the U.S. 27th Marine Regiment showed the presence of the 3rd and 21st Regiments near Go Noi Island, whereas the 2nd Division Headquarters was reported to be in the Quế Sơn Valley. Despite the lack of accurate information, allied intelligence generally agreed the PAVN might begin attacking isolated outposts and units as their next course of action. Subsequently, on 4 May 1968, the 23rd Infantry Division made amendments to their "Golden Valley Plan", the plan for the relief and reinforcement of CIDG camps, to enable the deployment of the 1st Battalion, 46th Infantry Regiment, 196th Light Infantry Brigade to support Khâm Đức.

Starting on 9 April, the U.S. 70th Engineer Battalion was flown in from Pleiku, about 160 kilometers (99 mi) to the south, to repair and upgrade the airfield for sustained use by C-130 Hercules transport aircraft. This work was a part of a secret plan, codenamed Santa Barbara, to improve several airstrips located near Laos in preparation for operations in Laos to cut off the Ho Chi Minh trail. The work had originally been planned to begin in January but was postponed due to the diversion of all transport aircraft to support Khe Sahn. By 8 May, the USAF had airlifted about 400 tonnes of cargo into Khâm Đức, including two bulldozers, by a C-124 Globemaster.

To counter a possible major PAVN attack, the U.S. military deployed 33 U.S. Marines from Battery D, 2nd Battalion, 13th Marine Regiment to support the defenders of Ngok Tavak. From 16 April, the Marine artillerymen used Khâm Đức as a staging area where they could assemble their entire detachment, which included two 105 mm howitzers, ammunition, and supplies. On 4 May, 33 Marines, along with 35,380 kilograms (78,000 lb) of equipment and supplies, were lifted into Ngok Tavak by helicopters. Meanwhile, towards the end of April, the 1st Regiment received orders to leave their base and take positions in the valley on the west side of Ngok Tavak, and wait there for the attack signal. The 40th Battalion, commanded by Major Đặng Ngọc Mai, was to spearhead the assault.

The outpost of Ngok Tavak was manned by the 11th Mobile Strike Force Company since March 1968. Earlier in the year, Company C, 5th Special Forces Group in Đà Nẵng came up with a plan to supplement the intelligence agencies in the Khâm Đức area, by deploying a MIKE Force company to operate south of the Special Forces Camp; subsequently, the 11th MIKE Force company was selected for the task. The unit was led by three members of the Australian Army Training Team Vietnam (AATTV): Captain John White and Warrant Officers Frank Lucas and Don Cameron. The Australian-led unit included eight U.S. Special Forces troops and 173 South Vietnamese and Nùng CIDG soldiers, and they were joined by the Marine artillerymen on 4 May. Upon their arrival, White and his men had set up camp on top of a hill in Ngok Tavak. They made improvements to the camp's defensive perimeter, which included an old minefield left by the French. Despite their preparations, in the days leading up to the battle, the unit was plagued by a number of problems with their defense.

Even though the Marine artillerymen of the 2/13th Marines were supposed to support the Ngok Tavak garrison, their arrival created significant logistical issues for Captain White. Due to the poor condition of the road that connected Ngok Tavak and Khâm Đức, where most of the ammunition was stocked, the Marines had to rely on transport aircraft to bring in ammunition supplies. But, due to high demand and scarce resources, the U.S. 1st Marine Aircraft Wing could not provide the support required by the defenders of Ngok Tavak. Only 31% of the Marines' heavy-lift aircraft was available for operations. When the Marines arrived at Ngok Tavak, White ordered the Marine detachment to place their howitzers on a downhill position outside the camp's perimeter—a highly vulnerable position—as the hilltop position was still covered by trees.

In an effort to bolster the strength of White's 11th MIKE Force company, a mortar platoon of about 35 CIDG was sent from Khâm Đức to reinforce the small garrison at Ngok Tavak during the final days of April. It was intended that the CIDG troops would provide local security for the garrison when the 11th MIKE Force company was out on patrol. Mistrust developed between White's men and the CIDG force, because the latter were known to contain PAVN infiltrators. On 28 April, elements of the PAVN 2nd Division received a message which stated that "scouts" were ready to cause confusion and disruption in the allies' defense of Khâm Đức. The CIDG troops were placed outside the camp's perimeter, where they roamed freely inside the Marines' area in the days before and after the arrival of the howitzers. On 9 May, the CIDG troops departed, to return to Khâm Đức, but shortly afterwards they returned to Ngok Tavak, claiming they had been ambushed by an unknown enemy unit. White and his Nùng soldiers were skeptical of the claim, as they believed the story about an ambush was a lie and that no real fighting had occurred. As a result, White insisted that the CIDG troops remain outside his perimeter.

From early May, the 1st Regiment tightened its noose around Ngok Tavak. On 3 May a 30-man platoon of "CIDG" troops arrived on foot unannounced. They were likely PAVN infiltrators dressed in CIDG uniforms. The Nungs distrusted them but White allowed them to enter the camp and deployed them to the lower fort. On 4 and 5 May, an Air Force FAC observed bridges and roads being repaired and trucks moving on QL 14. On 6 May, a SF/CIDG patrol discovered an PAVN observation post about 6.5 kilometers (4.0 mi) from the base with a clear view of the camp and a model of its defenses. That same day, a platoon-sized patrol from Ngok Tavak made contact with PAVN units about 1 kilometer (0.62 mi) south of the garrison. On the evening of 7 May, enemy soldiers were believed to have set off trip flares, which prompted the Nùng soldiers to hurl grenades at the perimeter. On 8 May, White ordered the Marines to pull their guns inside the perimeter, so they could better defend the position from the top of the 738-meter (2,421 ft)-high hill. The Marines spent the evening of 8 May dismantling the first howitzer in order to move it up the hill. That night, enemy soldiers set off trip flares and again the Nùng soldiers threw grenades in response. On 9 May, Captain Chris Silva flew to Ngok Tavak to discuss the reliability of his troops with his Australian counterpart, but was prevented from returning to Khâm Đức due to poor weather. On that day, the second howitzer was dragged into the perimeter, so the Nùngs and Marines both guarded the perimeter of Ngok Tavak. Infantry protection was provided by the 1st and 2nd Nùng platoons, which held the east side of the garrison, while the suspect CIDG soldiers guarded the east entrance. Overlooking them were some Marines of Battery D, 2nd Battalion.

== Battle ==
=== The fight at Ngok Tavak ===
In the early hours of 10 May, the 40th Battalion of the 1st Regiment, reinforced by CIDG units, moved into position and made final preparations for the attack on Ngok Tavak. Special assault squads were formed to breach the camp's perimeter, while the second squad would fan out to destroy key targets inside the garrison. White was alerted to the movements of enemy troops outside his perimeter, so he quickly organized his Nùng soldiers and placed his troops on 50% alert.

Shortly after 03:00, the suspect CIDG troops approached the garrison from the east entrance, where they asked the U.S. Marine guarding the outer perimeter to let them through. As the CIDG troops entered the perimeter, satchel charges were hurled at allied positions while PAVN soldiers lit up the perimeters with flamethrowers, marking the first double-cross of the battle. The Marine detachment, commanded by Lieutenant Bob Adams, turned their howitzers on the enemy and expended every round they had, then thermited the guns.

The initial PAVN attack had split allied formations in the garrison: the 1st and 2nd Platoons of the 11th MIKE Force company were pushed away from the eastern perimeter, while the Marines were either alone or had organized themselves into small groups of two or three, out of contact with one another. From inside his command post, White called for air-support which later came in the form of an AC-47 Spooky gunship. On the east side of the garrison, PAVN soldiers of the 40th Battalion charged up the hill firing their AK-47 assault rifles. Other elements of the 1st Regiment probed the southern and western ends of the perimeter, held by Captain White's 1st and 3rd Platoons, to probe for weak points. By that stage, however, most Nùng soldiers had retreated from their positions at the east end of the garrison, while the Marines were pinned down around the perimeter. By 03:30, the PAVN had captured the Marines' gun position. Captain White was able to maintain contact with Warrant Officers Cameron and Lucas, but they could not coordinate their forces.

Although the PAVN held most of the Ngok Tavak garrison, particularly on the eastern side, their attack stalled. After the 40th Battalion overran the command post, they tried to advance on the landing zone where allied soldiers had established a strong defense from fortified underground bunkers which the PAVN had failed to detect in their reconnaissance patrols. At 04:20, an AC-47 gunship from the 4th Air Commando Squadron was reported to be flying over the garrison, so White directed the aircraft to fire on PAVN-held positions around the perimeter. After warning the Marines and the Nùngs, White ordered the aircraft to fire on the deployed 105 mm howitzers. The arrival of the AC-47 enabled the allied forces to hold the last remaining ground, and repulse the final attack. By 05:30, fighting in Ngok Tavak was limited to the hurling of grenades, and random fire on any movement that was believed to be that of the PAVN. In one of their final attempts to overcome the last allied position, the PAVN set off tear gas of such low density that it had little effect on most of the allied soldiers.

The PAVN commanders, interviewed in 1998, stated that they had planned a rapid assault followed by an equally rapid withdrawal to protect their forces from the air assault they knew would be coming. When they were unable to capture the base, they retreated rapidly to pre-arranged bunkers to withstand the air and artillery attacks that followed.

As events in Ngok Tavak unfolded, White sent urgent messages to Company C, 5th Special Forces Headquarters in Đà Nẵng, as well as to the Americal Division, to request support. In response, the 5th Special Forces Headquarters ordered Captain Eugene Makowski to fly to Khâm Đức, where he would assume command of the 12th Mobile Strike Force Company, and then reinforce Ngok Tavak. Then, just before sunrise, PAVN Colonel Trí ordered the 40th Battalion to pull out of Ngok Tavak in order to deal with an enemy relief force, and leave behind only a blocking force to hold the captured positions inside the garrison. Following those events, Australian Warrant Officers Cameron and Lucas mounted a counterattack using a handful of Nùng soldiers in an attempt to retake captured positions. The Marines who had survived the night assault joined the fight, and the Australian-led formation gradually pushed the last remaining enemy soldiers beyond the defensive perimeter.

By early morning, White expected further assaults from the PAVN 40th Battalion, but it had moved out towards Khâm Đức with the rest of the PAVN 2nd Division. The AC-47 flying overhead continued to direct fighter-bombers against suspected PAVN positions around Ngok Tavak, but the garrison continued to receive sporadic mortar, RPG, and small-arms fire. In addition to close air support missions, medevac helicopters flew in to evacuate the wounded, and U.S. aircrews reported that they did not receive fire while flying over the enemy's area of operations. Captain Silva and Lieutenant Adams, who were both wounded during the main battle, were also evacuated. While the wounded were being flown out, the surviving elements of the 11th MIKE Force company and the Marines consolidated their positions, even though cohesion had broken down between the allied soldiers as a result of the double-cross that occurred earlier in the battle. Makowski's 12th MIKE Force company had departed Khâm Đức and was approaching Ngok Tavak onboard four U.S. Marine CH-46 Sea Knight helicopters.

At around 09:30, the four CH-46 helicopters arrived in Ngok Tavak with reinforcements, and they were able to unload Makowski and about 45 soldiers of the 12th MIKE Force company. The PAVN made their presence known when the second helicopter was hit with automatic weapons fire, and was forced to land intact, though with damage to its fuel line. Moments later, the third helicopter was struck by an RPG as it turned around to rescue the crews of the first downed helicopter, and it was destroyed immediately. With two downed helicopters blocking the landing zone, no more reinforcements could be offloaded. The remaining helicopters were prevented from landing, and the wounded had to be evacuated while the medevac helicopters were hovering. As the last helicopter took off, two Nùngs and one stranded U.S. soldier grabbed the helicopter skids to get out of Ngok Tavak, but all three fell to their deaths. Shortly after his arrival, Makowski placed the 12th MIKE Force company under the command of his Australian counterpart, as the situation continued to worsen.

Because his Nùng soldiers were exhausted, with their ammunition and water supplies running low, White believed they could not defend Ngok Tavak if the PAVN launched another major attack. At 10:45, White requested permission to evacuate the garrison, but he was told to wait for the arrival of reinforcements. However, both White and Makowski knew that reinforcement was unlikely, because the two downed helicopters prevented further landings required for the insertion of additional troops, and the road between Ngok Tavak and Khâm Đức was likely to be covered by the opposing forces waiting in ambush. White decided to evacuate Ngok Tavak. All equipment that could not be taken or was considered to be of value to the enemy was dumped into the command bunker and set alight using captured enemy flamethrowers. The Marines were ordered to fire their last remaining shells, about nine rounds in total, after their ammunition storage was set ablaze by the PAVN, and disable their 105 mm guns.

As White expected the survivors to have to fight their way out of Ngok Tavak, he decided to leave dead allied soldiers behind. His decision caused distress among the survivors, but White thought that evacuating the dead through enemy lines would be suicidal. After the Marines and Mobile Strike Force personnel destroyed their unneeded equipment, they were directed to form an order-of-march out of Ngok Tavak, in order to protect the wounded and those with little infantry experience. Just before they left the garrison, Cameron blew up the first CH-46 helicopter that was still intact on the landing zone, using an M-72 anti-tank weapon. The order-of-march was led by a group of Nùng soldiers, who were followed by White and the survivors of the Marine artillery detachment, and behind them was another group of Nùng soldiers covering the tail of the column. Together they evaded PAVN formations surrounding the hill at Ngok Tavak and marched eastward towards Khâm Đức.

About halfway between Ngok Tavak and Khâm Đức, White and his column climbed a mountain where they cleared the jungle to create a landing zone, and called for helicopters to evacuate the survivors. A flight of CH-46s later arrived and, in a scene that would be repeated at Khâm Đức, chaos descended on the allied formation as Nùng and U.S. personnel fought their way onto the helicopters. Some of the Nùng soldiers had to be thrown off because the helicopters quickly reached their capacity; eventually U.S. aircrews had to dump some of their equipment to accommodate the last remaining Nùngs. By 08:00, the evacuation of the Ngok Tavak survivors was completed. White immediately flew out to Đà Nẵng along with the two Australian Warrant Officers after they arrived in Khâm Đức. The fight at Ngok Tavak, though short in duration, took a heavy toll on the Allied forces. An unknown number of Nùng soldiers and 12 U.S. military personnel were killed, and 52 (including two U.S. Army and 21 U.S. Marines) were wounded.

On 11 May five B-52 missions involving 30 sorties were flown over Ngok Tavak about 05:45, bombing target boxes in suspected areas of enemy concentration.

=== The Battle of Khâm Đức ===
At 02:45 on 10 May, in conjunction with the ground assault on Ngok Tavak, elements of the PAVN 2nd Division subjected Khâm Đức to a heavy barrage of mortar and recoilless rifle fire. The PAVN 21st Regiment, later reinforced by the 1st Regiment, took up positions in preparation for an attack. At 08:30, the Americal Division activated "Operation Golden Valley" to reinforce the camp. At 08:45 the division requested permission from III MAF to change the reaction force so the 2nd Battalion, 1st Infantry Regiment (2/1st Infantry) would replace the 1st Battalion, 46th Infantry Regiment (1/46th Infantry). In the meantime, however, Company A of 1/46th Infantry would provide the needed reinforcement, until the 2/1st Infantry was in position. At around 10:50, Company A, 1/46th Infantry, led by Lieutenant Bobby Thompson, arrived in Khâm Đức along with some supporting artillery and ammunition. Thompson's company dug in at the end of the runway nearest OP 1 with XO Peter Everts' platoon overlooking the deep ravine where caves kept the PAVN safe from B-52 strikes.

About six hours later, the 2/1st Infantry, commanded by Lieutenant Colonel Robert B. Nelson, touched down at the airfield and immediately set up defensive positions in support of Detachment A-105. Under sporadic but sometimes heavy enemy mortar attacks, U.S. and allied forces strengthened their defenses, as there were no significant ground probes on 10–11 May. Allied defenses at Khâm Đức were strengthened but the PAVN occupied the surrounding high ground, where they could target allied ground targets and support aircraft with a high level of accuracy. On 11 May Cushman recommended to Westmoreland that Khâm Đức, now defended by more than 1,500 allied troops encumbered with 272 civilians, be evacuated. Westmoreland agreed, believing that Khâm Đức lacked the "defensive potential of Khe Sanh" and no longer held "any military or political significance". The order to evacuate was issued at 06:05 on the morning of 12 May.

On 12 May, U.S. commanders on the ground in Khâm Đức were notified of Westmoreland's decision to evacuate. Some units on the ground were left uninformed about the decision, and it led to chaos later when evacuation was underway. Communications problems were exacerbated by nine different involved units (the Americal battalion, the Army engineer company, the SF-A team, the SOG detachment, the Air Force transport crews, the Army and Marine helicopter crews, the Air Force, Navy, Marine and ARVN attack pilots, the Air Force FACs, and the Air Force Airborne Command and Control Center), communicating on different frequencies using different equipment. Ground forces used PRC-25 FM radios with 920 available frequencies. Fixed-wing elements had UHF and VHF radios. Troop-carrying and attack helicopters had UHF, VHF and FM radios. Communications were further confused by rear-area commanders demanding to know the status of their troops and the progress of the battle as well as convey orders for actions that needed to be taken.

==== The attacks on the outposts ====
Originally there were seven outposts at Khâm Đức, but two had been abandoned. The remaining five were manned by CIDG personnel until reinforcements arrived. During the battle 3 hilltop OPs (1-3) were manned by Americal squads supplementing the CIDG squads already on them, & the other 2 OPs were manned only by CIDG squads. One was on another hilltop north of the airstrip, & the other was east of the SF camp on the edge of the gorge overlooking the river. The 1 on the hilltop north of the SF camp returned to the camp as soon as the attack began on the 2 hilltop OPs manned by the Americal squads. A few minutes afterwards, the Americal squad on the 3rd hilltop OP was ordered to return to their unit around the airstrip. The 5th OP manned by a CIDG squad was not attacked, but in the afternoon of May 12 they abandoned it & returned to the SF camp.

During the predawn hours of 12 May, elements of the PAVN 2nd Division (the 1st and the 21st Regiments) increased pressure on the camp. The PAVN prepared for an assault on the main base by assaulting three of its outposts. The OPs were manned by U.S. soldiers of the Americal Division and CIDG troops, contained concrete bunkers and machines guns and had perimeters protected by concertina wire. The first OP to be assaulted was OP-2 at 02:45. Within fifteen minutes, all but three of its defenders had been killed.

OP-1 was the next to be assaulted about 03:20, but they called on an AC-47 'Spooky' to drop flares and shot the attackers as they tried to negotiate the concertina wire, killing many of them. They were assaulted a second time about an hour later, and the attackers took control of the northwest bunker. The defenders called for an artillery strike on the northwest bunker, but it had little effect. Meanwhile, Major Buchwald ordered the defenders of OP-1 and OP-3 to abandon their positions and return to base to avoid being overrun.

==== Assaults on the main base ====
Consequently, PAVN occupied all the high ground, from which they could fire down on any support aircraft that tried to resupply the camp or to evacuate people from it. By sunrise, the PAVN moved closer to the camp under the cover of early morning fog. About one hour before the fog lifted, an additional 24 B-52 bombers dropped several hundred tonnes of bombs on suspected PAVN positions south of Khâm Đức. At 08:20, General Burl W. McLaughlin, commander of the 834th Air Division, was ordered by the U.S. 7th Air Force to make an all-out effort to evacuate Khâm Đức. Ten minutes later, Air Force General William Momyer declared a "Grand Slam emergency". This meant that he controlled all Air Force, Navy and Marine fixed-wing aircraft and all Army rotor-winged aircraft in South Vietnam, no matter what their parent unit or current locations were at his disposal, a massive amount of firepower to bring to bear on Khâm Đức. He diverted 120 Air Force fighter and tactical bombers, based in South Vietnam and Thailand, 16 Marine A-4s, six Republic of Vietnam Air Force F-5s and two carrier-based Navy fighter-bombers to the battle

By 09:35, B-52 strikes had clearly failed to stop the PAVN advance when the camp's southeast perimeter was subjected to a massive ground assault. To stop the onslaught, U.S. fighter-bombers were called in to strafe PAVN formations, while U.S. soldiers on the ground used small arms and artillery fire to break up the attack at point-blank range. That assault was met with a massive amount of air power that repulsed it, inflicting heavy casualties on the attacking force.

A U.S. Army UH-1 Huey and an O-2 Skymaster were shot down while circling the compound. By the time the first attack was stopped, the opposite end of the compound also came under fire, and by early morning tactical air-support became difficult, as PAVN troops were in close proximity with U.S. and allied forces. A U.S. Army CH-47 Chinook then arrived to begin the process of evacuation, but it took several hits from anti-aircraft fire. The helicopter then burst into flames, exploded, and blocked the runway. U.S. soldiers of the 70th Engineer Battalion first tried to remove the wreckage with a forklift (their only operating vehicle, the bulldozers having been disassembled in preparation for airlift out). The forklift caught fire from the burning plane, and the engineers then assembled one of their bulldozers to push the downed helicopter off the runway. PAVN troops mortared the bulldozer, but SP5 Don Hostler cleared the wreckage and then moved the bulldozer back into camp. By 10:00 they had cleared the obstacles which would have prevented fixed-wing aircraft from using the airfield. Almost simultaneously, a U.S. Air Force A-1 Skyraider flown by Major James N. Swain Jr. was shot down outside the camp perimeter.

The unfolding events seemed to have a negative impact on the cohesion between U.S. and South Vietnamese indigenous forces. The resolve of the CIDG soldiers, in particular, had apparently been shaken and they disobeyed an order to carry out a sweep operation at the rear end of the camp; their Vietnamese commander refused to leave his bunker to encourage the soldiers. The morale and discipline of the indigenous forces had sunk so low that they began to leave their defensive positions without permission, although their section of the camp was never subjected to a major ground attack. Consequently, the behavior of indigenous CIDG soldiers during the various stages of the battle, coupled with information that "friendly" CIDG troops had turned on U.S. Marines at Ngok Tavak, had the effect of unnerving U.S. troops in Khâm Đức. To ensure CIDG soldiers would not abandon their posts, U.S. soldiers threatened to shoot anyone attempting to run away.

The third and final assault occurred as the evacuation was ongoing and when only the SF-4 and SOG troops and their loyal indigenous troops remained on the base. The attackers, having learned from their open field assaults that had cost them dearly, assembled in a heavily vegetated gulch to the east and south of the SF perimeter. Although they were spotted by air and attacked they continued to mass for a final assault. At 15:30 they assaulted the SOG garrison in a human wave assault, and the commander called in a danger-close napalm attack that decimated their ranks.

=== Evacuation ===
At approximately 10:00, the runway at Khâm Đức was cleared of the wrecked helicopter. Moments later, a C-130 piloted by Lieutenant Colonel Daryl D. Cole touched down under heavy fire, which burst one tire and caused extensive damage to his wing tanks. Almost immediately, Cole's aircraft was rushed by hysterical Vietnamese civilians from ditches along the runway, filling the aircraft so the loadmaster was prevented from unloading the aircraft's cargo. Under heavy fire, Cole navigated his aircraft down the cratered and shrapnel-littered runway in order to take off. The combined weight of the cargo and civilians, in addition to the damage sustained during landing, prevented the aircraft from gathering enough speed to take off. So the aircrew aborted the take off, offloaded the civilians, and cut off the blown tire to stop it from flapping and slowing down the aircraft. They cut the rubber with bayonets and were able to cut through the steel beading thanks to the engineers carefully cutting the steel cords with a blowtorch. A fire extinguisher was kept handy because of fear of catching the magnesium wheel on fire. About two hours later, realizing that PAVN mortar rounds were coming closer to his aircraft, Cole tried to take off for the second time, and managed to get the C-130 into the air. This time his only passengers were three members of Air Force Combat Control Team (CCT), whose radio equipment had been destroyed.

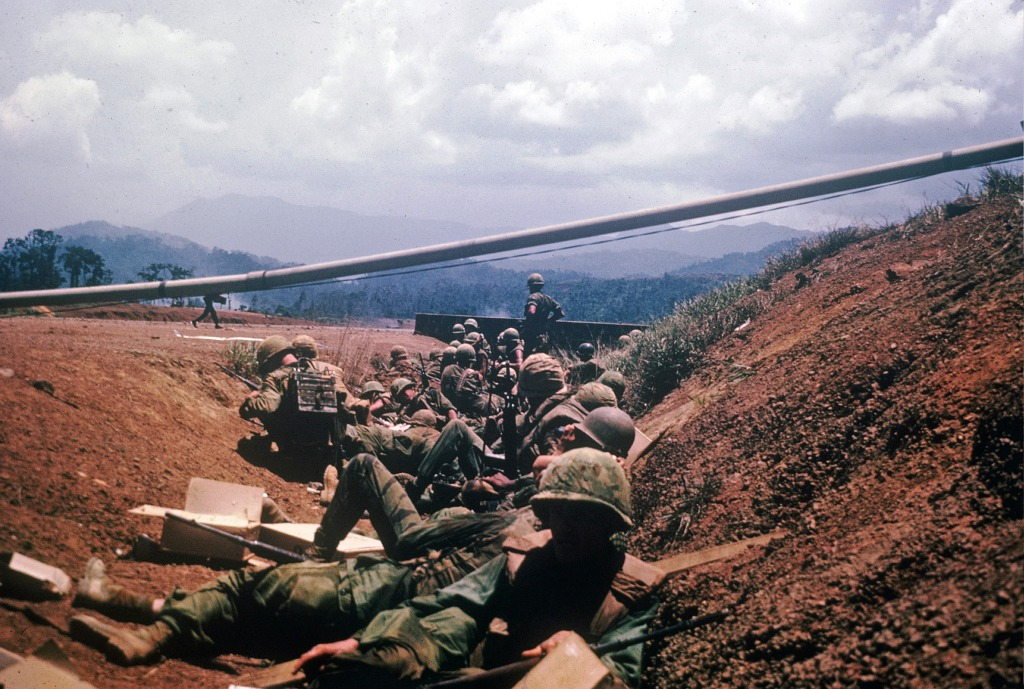
U.S. soldiers of Company A, 70th Engineer Battalion, waiting to be airlifted out of Khâm Đức, in a ditch beside the runway.

Just after Cole's C-130 left Khâm Đức, a C-123 flown by Major Ray D. Shelton landed and took out 44 U.S. engineers and 21 South Vietnamese civilians. Shortly after Shelton landed his aircraft, he reported that enemy fire was coming in from all quadrants, but he was able to take off after just three minutes on the ground. By 11:10, just 145 people had been evacuated by Shelton's aircraft, and a handful of helicopters. After that, another three C-130s also arrived in the vicinity of Khâm Đức, but the pilots were told not to land. In the afternoon, the C-130s resumed their operations. At 15:25, Major Bernard L. Bucher's C-130 approached Khâm Đức's airfield from the south and landed despite taking numerous hits. 183 Vietnamese women and children rushed onto the aircraft; as soon as the aircraft was full, Bucher took off to the north, unaware that opposing forces were concentrated in that area. At 15:30 Bucher's aircraft was quickly riddled by ground fire; it crashed less than a mile from the end of the runway. All 183 South Vietnamese civilians, one U.S. Army Special Forces officer and all five U.S. aircrew died in the crash. At the time, it was the deadliest aircraft crash in history, and is still the deadliest aviation incident on Vietnamese soil.

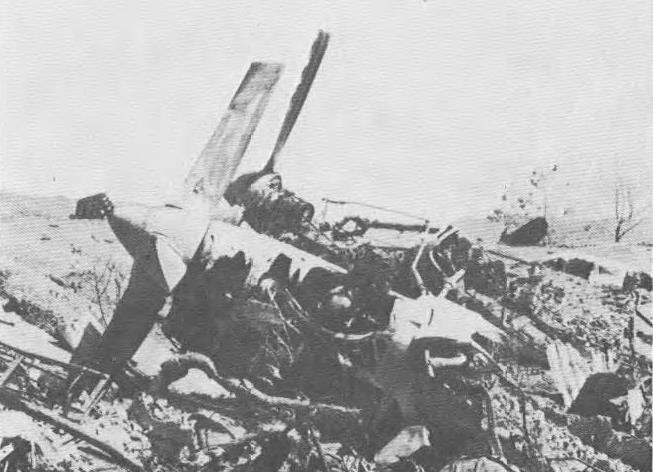
The wreckage of Major Bucher's C-130

Following the loss of Bucher and his aircraft, there were still more than 600 people on the ground. Next in line was Lieutenant Colonel William Boyd; he was flying an airlift mission into Chu Lai Air Base, until he was diverted into Khâm Đức to extract forces and civilians there. Just before Boyd touched down, a mortar shell exploded about 100 feet (30 m) in front of his aircraft, so he was forced to push the throttle forward. Boyd then pulled up and went around for a second approach, because he could see the desperation of the people on the ground. As he landed, hundreds of civilians and soldiers poured out of the ditches and rushed onto the aircraft. Because he had witnessed the destruction of Bucher's C-130 while taking off to the north, Boyd flew out to the southwest. After Boyd's aircraft was airborne, he banked the aircraft so it would be masked by the rolling terrain. The aircraft sustained damage to the left wing, the fuselage, and the leading edge of both wings, but it landed safely in Chu Lai.

As Boyd took off, another C-130 piloted by Lieutenant Colonel John Delmore closed in on Khâm Đức. At an altitude of about 300–400 ft (91–122 m), Delmore's aircraft began to receive PAVN fire and both sides of the cockpit were riddled by bullets that had come through the floorboards. Just before touch down, Delmore and his co-pilot shut down the engines and forced the aircraft to remain upright. With no brakes and little directional control, the aircraft crashed into the CH-47 that had been destroyed early in the morning, but Delmore managed to turn his aircraft off the runway to avoid blocking it. When the aircraft had stopped completely, the five-man crew got out as quickly as they could. About 20 minutes later, U.S. soldiers on the ground guided them to safety, and they were rescued by a U.S. Marine CH-46. After witnessing the destruction of two C-130s, Lieutenant Colonel Franklin Montgomery landed his C-130 and extracted more than 150 Vietnamese civilians and some CIDG and U.S. soldiers. Montgomery's aircraft suffered no hits but the loadmaster was knocked down and trampled by panic-stricken Vietnamese civilians whilst trying to maintain order.

Once Montgomery had flown out, another two C-130s arrived in Khâm Đức to continue the evacuation; the first aircraft picked up 130 people and the one after that took out 90. There were now only a few people remaining on the ground in Khâm Đức, and most of them were U.S. Special Forces troops and indigenous CIDG personnel. Major James L. Wallace flew into Khâm Đức and extracted the last group, as ammunition dumps began to explode and the aircrews reported hysteria among the Vietnamese soldiers who had lost family members in Bucher's crash. Just when the aircrews believed the mission was over, a C-130 piloted by Lieutenant Colonel Jay Van Cleeff was ordered to reinsert the three-man Combat Control Team, which had been airlifted out of the compound earlier in the day by Colonel Cole. In protest, Van Cleeff argued that the camp was almost completely evacuated, but the control center insisted that the CCT be reinserted to complete their task of coordinating the evacuation. At about 16:20, Van Cleeff landed his aircraft on the runway and the Combat Control Team, led by C-130 pilot and airlift mission commander Major John W. Gallagher, and two Combat Controllers, Technical Sergeant Morton Freedman and Staff Sergeant James Lundie immediately jumped from the aircraft.

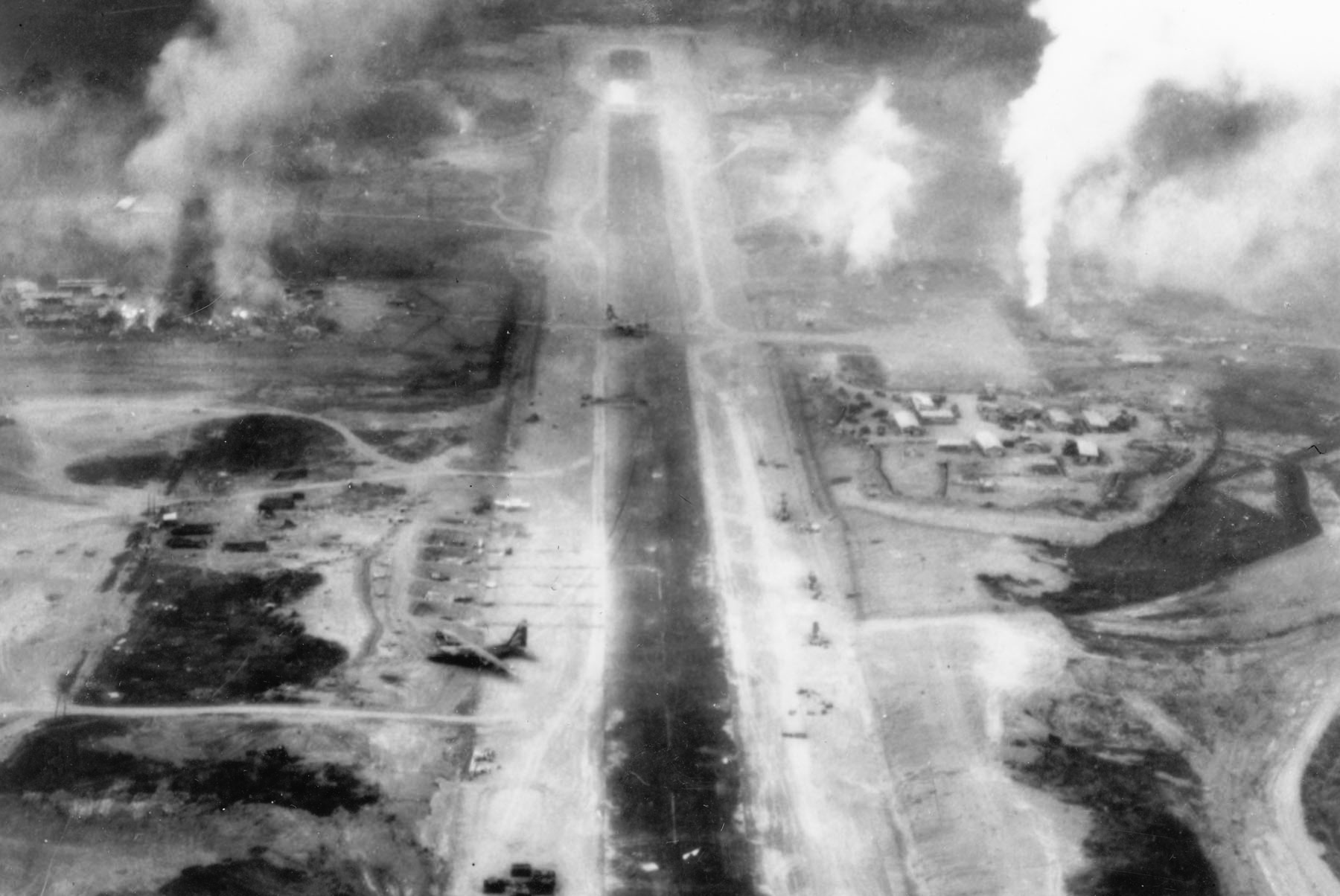
The only photo ever to capture actions leading to a Medal of Honor; Lieutenant Colonel Joe M. Jackson's C-123 (top of photograph) prepares to evacuate the last three men (on runway, right) from Khâm Đức, on 12 May 1968.

After Gallagher's team returned to the camp, Van Cleeff waited on the runway for two minutes to extract survivors, but when nobody appeared he opened the throttle and took off. As soon as Van Cleeff's aircraft was airborne, another C-130 pilot reported to General McLaughlin that the evacuation had been completed, and the facility could now be destroyed at will. Van Cleeff quickly notified all aircraft in the vicinity that he had just reinserted the CCT. Gallagher's team searched the Special Forces compound, the Americal Division battalion command post, and the artillery compound, but everybody either had been evacuated or was dead. Khâm Đức was in PAVN hands, so Gallagher and the other two men ran to the ditch beside the runway, where they tried to make contact with the aircraft overhead, but the radio was disabled along with all other equipment. While waiting rescue, members of the CCT engaged PAVN troops who had set up a machine gun position beneath the wing of Delmore's crashed C-130, and disabled the weapon.

During the ordeal, several forward air-controllers were sent out to make low passes over Khâm Đức to locate the CCT, without success. Then, in response to a call for the nearest aircraft to land on the runway to search for the stranded CCT, Lieutenant Colonel Alfred J. Jeanotte approached the airfield from the south and landed his C-123 on the runway with support from fighter-bombers, which were used to suppress enemy fire. Not seeing the men, Jeanotte applied full power and took off to avoid taking hits from PAVN anti-aircraft fire. As the C-123 rolled past the CCT's position, the three men came out of their position chasing the aircraft with their arms waving. Believing that the aircraft had missed them, the three men ran back to the ditch on the left side of the runway. As the C-123 was airborne, Jeanotte banked his aircraft to the left, and that enabled the aircrew to see the three men running back towards the ditch. However, Jeanotte was deterred from making another attempt at landing, because of low fuel. The next C-123 in line, piloted by Lieutenant Colonel Joe M. Jackson, landed on the runway as fire swept through the camp and the aircrew were able to extract the stranded CCT under heavy fire and they flew out to Đà Nẵng. By 17:00, the evacuation was over. On 13 May, 60 B-52s bombed the Khâm Đức camp.

== Aftermath ==
The battle for Khâm Đức and Ngok Tavak has been described as a defeat for U.S. forces. Accounts of the battle have called it "a Khe Sanh in reverse", "an embarrassing defeat", "an unequivocal debacle", "a decisive North Vietnamese and Viet Cong victory", and "the high point for Hanoi".

=== Strategies and tactics ===
For the PAVN, the strategy chosen was the same as it was for Khe Sanh and Dien Bien Phu. They sought to create a newsworthy defeat on the eve of negotiations to influence public opinion and obtain a more favorable result at the negotiating table. Thirty years after the battle, retired MG Phan Thanh Du, who was operations officer during the battle, implied that the main tactical objective of the battle was to draw reinforcements into the battle, as had happened in 1967 in the Battle of Dak To, so they could be destroyed. The PAVN had brought an entire film crew to the battle to document the presumed victory for use as propaganda. The date of the beginning of negotiations was even pushed back to allow the attacking forces more time to prepare. The peace talks were originally scheduled to begin on Friday, May 10, but on Saturday May 11 they were rescheduled for Monday, May 13, the day after the main attack on KD. On 28 May, MACV revealed a captured PAVN directive that indicated that the North Vietnamese saw the May Offensive as a way to influence the Paris Peace talks.

For the allied forces, the strategy adopted was to take advantage of the PAVN massing of forces to inflict massive casualties and degrade the fighting capability of the attacking force using overwhelming airpower while keeping their own casualties to a minimum. This strategy had been employed many times before with excellent results but it had never been tested in an area with the weather problems that Khâm Đức routinely endured. The serendipitous arrival of clear skies on 12 May meant that the allied forces had won the chess match. There was no slaughter of American troops, because overwhelming air power devastated the ranks of the PAVN. After the base was evacuated, American airpower bombed the area heavily for two days.

=== Losses incurred ===
The results of the battle were 42 American dead, about 220 CIDG dead or missing, and an estimated 345 to 2,000 PAVN dead. Like the Tet Offensive, descriptions of the results of the battle seem to ignore the massive losses inflicted on the PAVN forces and amplify the much smaller numbers of allied dead and missing. The official PAVN history of the 2nd Division claims that it "peeled away" the five outer strongpoints and then the inner five using artillery. There were no strongpoints at Kham Duc, and the 2nd Division had no artillery at Kham Duc.

Unlike the fight at Khe Sanh, American airpower "averted a massacre" but could not prevent the PAVN from dominating the high ground surrounding Khâm Đức. General Creighton Abrams described the losses at Khâm Đức as a "minor disaster". U.S. decisions at Khâm Đức at a higher command level may have been influenced by the events of Khe Sanh earlier in 1968, which were subjected to intense media comparison with the French defeat at Dien Bien Phu, and the clash of operational thinking between Westmoreland and senior USMC generals. If there was any lesson to be learned by Westmoreland and other U.S. commanders, the battle of Khâm Đức showed that "air power was not a cure-all". The command and control system of the U.S. Air Force during the ordeal was imperfect, as demonstrated by the "blunders involving the combat control teams".

A final, notable outcome of Khâm Đức was that it closed the last Special Forces CIDG camp in the I Corps Tactical Zone close to the border with Laos. This made ground surveillance of the Ho Chi Minh Trail much more difficult, allowing North Vietnam to move supplies and develop new branches of the trail. Despite setbacks, the evacuation of the Khâm Đức Special Forces Camp strongly highlighted the morale, discipline and the motivation of the U.S. Air Force personnel who took part in the operation. From the very first day of the struggle at Khâm Đức, it was clear that ground units were not prepared for an emergency evacuation, due to the lack of experience in terms of integrating the numbers and types of aircraft in such a small geographical area. U.S. aircrews had to improvise by establishing their own procedures to extract military and civilian personnel from the besieged camp. Despite having lost two C-130 aircraft, U.S. pilots were undeterred from completing their mission, indeed, their bravery was exemplified by Lieutenant Colonel Joe M. Jackson, who received a Medal of Honor for the rescue of the three-man Combat Control Team.

The U.S. Army lost one killed in action and 71 wounded at Khâm Đức and the U.S. Marines lost 12 killed and 21 wounded at Ngok Tavak. The combined services reported the highest number of missing in any battle in Vietnam, with 31 U.S. military personnel reported missing in action. Of the 31 missing, 19 were from the 2/1st Infantry: of these three were rescued within five days, one was captured and kept as a POW until March 1973, and 15 listed as killed in action (remains of nine recovered, six not recovered). The U.S. lost twelve aircraft: nine within the vicinity of Khâm Đức and two helicopters and an Cessna O-1 Bird Dog FAC plane on or near Ngok Tavak. The PAVN claimed to have killed about 300 American soldiers and captured 104 enemy troops, including two American advisors, as well as capturing vast quantities of weapons and ammunition that were left behind. For South Vietnam, several hundred Special Forces and indigenous CIDG soldiers were believed to have been killed, as well as about 183 civilians who perished in Major Bucher's crash. The total number of PAVN casualties is unknown, but the U.S. military claimed to have killed roughly 345 enemy soldiers. Estimates made in a more recent study puts the number at 1,500 to 2,000 PAVN killed.

=== Further activities at Khâm Đức ===
In July 1970, troops from the 196th Infantry Brigade reoccupied Khâm Đức as part of Operation Elk Canyon I and II to disrupt the PAVN logistics system in Quảng Tín Province and forestall a PAVN offensive in the autumn and winter. While they occupied Khâm Đức U.S. forces conducted searches for the remains of the Americans missing in the battle two years earlier. In 1993–1994 teams from the Joint POW/MIA Accounting Command located the Bucher crash site and recovered the remains of the six crewmen. The remains were buried together at Arlington National Cemetery in December 2008. In 1998, teams from the Joint Task Force-Full Accounting (later renamed Joint POW/MIA Accounting Command) located 11 Marines who were part of the artillery battalion that was airlifted into Ngok Tavak and died there. Five sets of remains were returned to their families. The remaining six, plus an Army Sergeant's remains, were buried as a group in Arlington National Cemetery.
