= Phước Sơn district =

Coordinates: 15.417°N 107.833°E

Phước Sơn district Huyện Phước Sơn
- District
- Location within Vietnam Location within Southeast Asia Location within Asia
- Country: Vietnam
- Region: South Central Coast
- Province: Quảng Nam
- Capital: Khâm Đức

Area
  - Total: 441 sq mi (1,141 km^{2})

Population (2003)
  - Total: 23,570
- Time zone: UTC+7 (Indochina Time)

Phước Sơn is a former rural district (huyện) of Quảng Nam province in the South Central Coast region of Vietnam. As of 2003 the district had a population of 20,141. The district covers an area of 1,141 km^{2} (441 sq mi). The district capital lies at Khâm Đức.

The district was the location of the 1968 Battle of Kham Duc, a major battle of the Vietnam War.

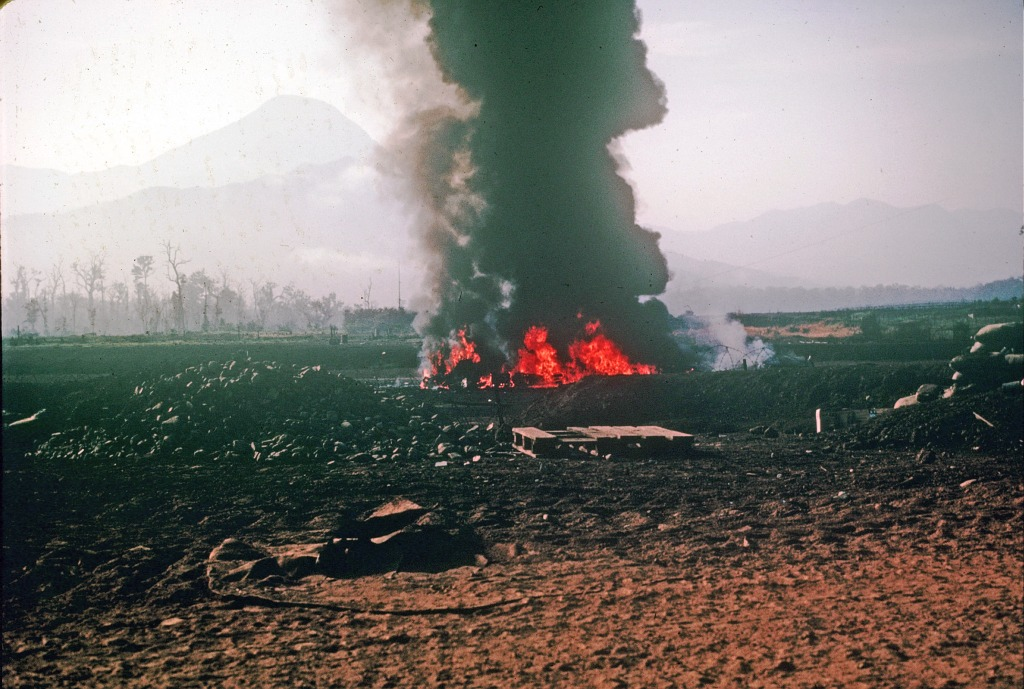
U.S. soldier during the Battle of Kham Duc; this is the CH-47 that was shot during the battle
