= Joe M. Jackson =

American military officer and recipient of the Medal of Honor (1923–2019)

Joe Madison Jackson
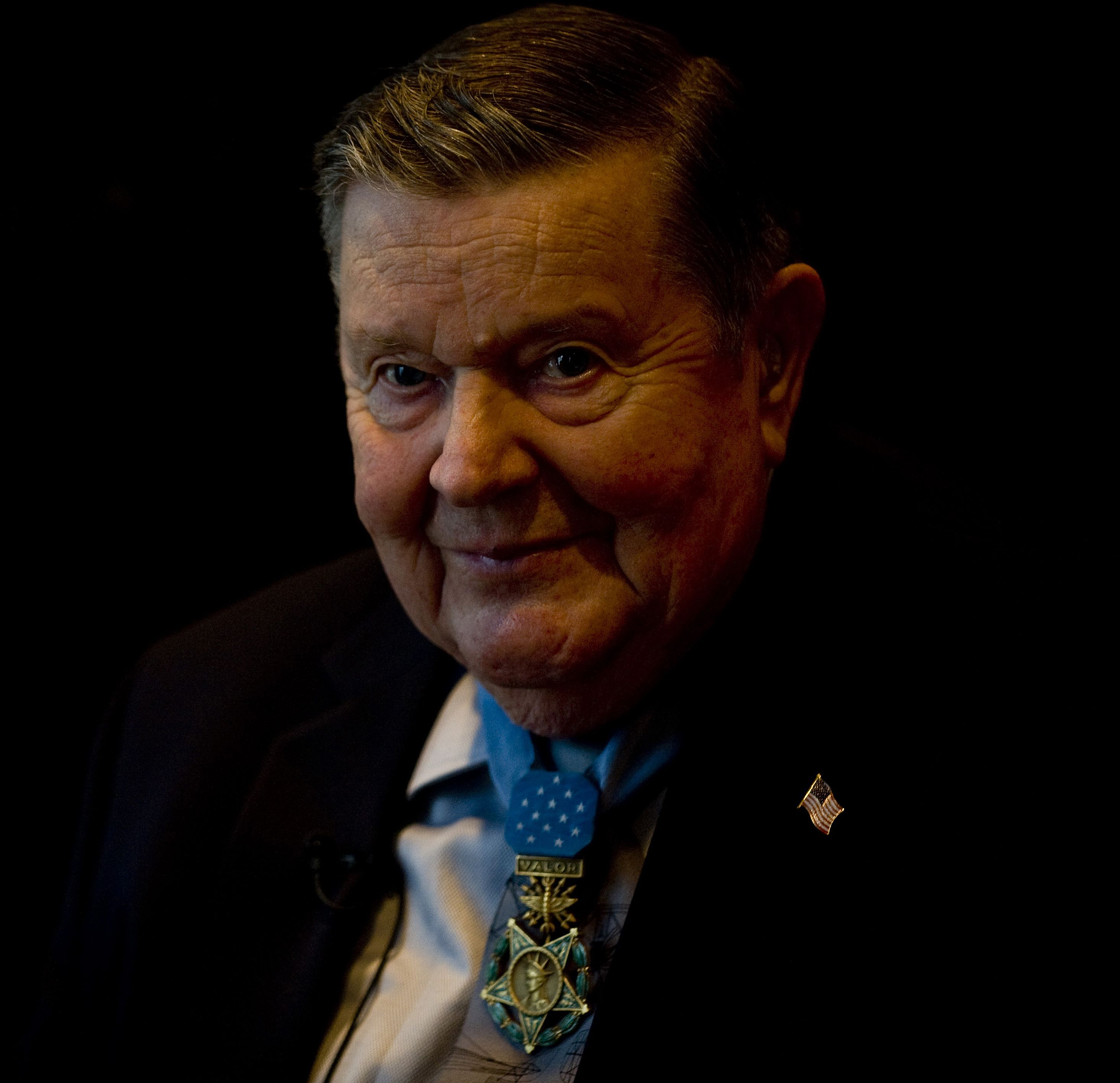
- Jackson in 2010
- Born: March 14, 1923; Newnan, Georgia, U.S.
- Died: January 12, 2019 (aged 95); Orting, Washington, U.S.
- Burial place: Arlington National Cemetery Section 34
- Military career
- Allegiance: United States of America
- Branch: United States Air Force; United States Army Air Corps
- Service years: 1941–1973 (32 years)
- Rank: Colonel
- Commands: 311th Air Commando Squadron
- Conflicts: World War II; Korean War; Vietnam War
- Awards: Medal of Honor; Legion of Merit; Distinguished Flying Cross; Air Medal (4)

Joe Madison Jackson (March 14, 1923 – January 12, 2019) served as a career officer in the United States Air Force and received the Medal of Honor for heroism above and beyond the call of duty during the Vietnam War. On 12 May 1968, he volunteered for a dangerous impromptu rescue of three remaining Air Force members (Maj. John W. Gallagher; TSgt. Morton J. Freedman; SSgt. James G. Lundie) trapped at an overrun Army Special Forces camp. While the camp was still under heavy enemy fire from North Vietnamese and Viet Cong troops, he skillfully piloted his C-123 cargo plane and rescued the three men.

== Military career ==
Jackson, born on March 14, 1923, in Newnan, Georgia, was an avid model aircraft enthusiast in his youth. He enlisted in the Army Air Corps in March 1941, a few days after his 18th birthday, in hopes of being an airplane mechanic.

=== World War II ===
After the United States entered World War II, Jackson was assigned to serve as crew chief aboard a B-25 Mitchell bomber. As a testament to his early flight aptitude, he substituted for a flight engineer who was sick for a training flight. During the flight, the right engine of the plane caught fire. The pilot of the aircraft, not knowing how to put out the fire, asked for Jackson's help, which resulted in Jackson saving the plane and crew. Afterwards, Jackson decided to be a pilot. He successfully completed Aviation Cadet Training and became a commissioned officer. He became a gunnery instructor, flying P-40 Warhawks and P-63 Kingcobras throughout the war, and ended the war at the controls of a B-24 Liberator bomber aircraft.

=== Korean War and early Cold War ===
During the late 1940s, Jackson returned to flying fighter aircraft.

During the Korean War, he was promoted to major and was assigned to the 524th Fighter Squadron. As the Operation Officer and Executive Officer of the squadron, he flew 107 combat missions in the F-84 Thunderjet as a fighter-bomber pilot.

His in-service accomplishments include:

- Discovering a formulaic method of navigating an aircraft back to base in poor weather
- Developing Standard Jet Penetration, a popular method of landing a jet aircraft with low ceilings and low visibility
- Developing mass transoceanic ferrying flights
- Creating a bomb-throwing method allowing nuclear weapons to be delivered by fighter aircraft
- Planning and directing aerial reconnaissance over Cuba during the Cuban Missile Crisis of 1962
- Becoming one of the first Air Force pilots to fly the U-2 Dragonlady reconnaissance aircraft

=== Vietnam War ===
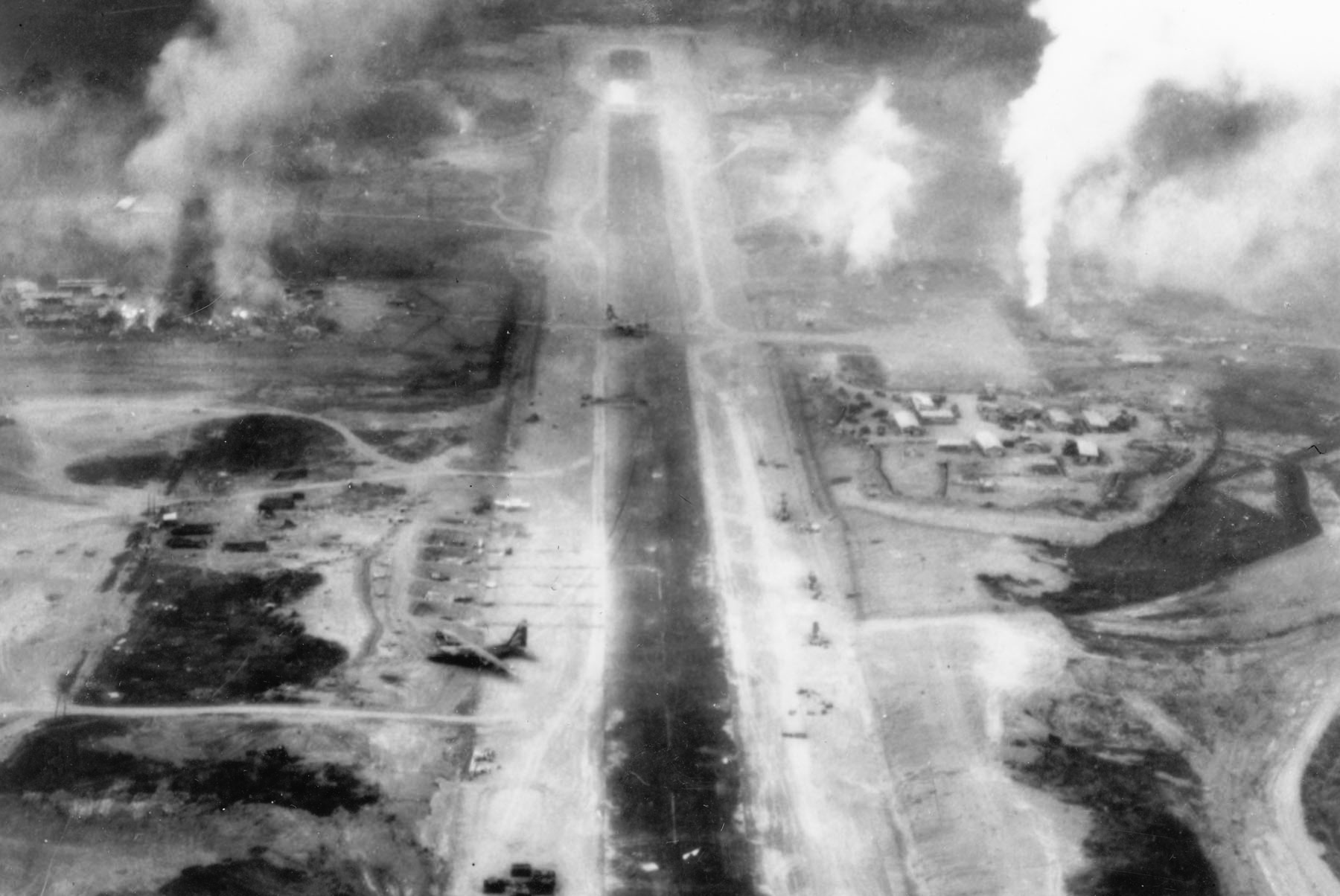
The first photo ever to capture actions leading to a Medal of Honor; Lieutenant Colonel Joe M. Jackson's C-123 (top of photograph) prepares to evacuate the last three men (on runway, right) from Khâm Đức, on 12 May 1968.

After completing a staff tour in Europe, Jackson volunteered to go to Vietnam. He was assigned to the 311th Air Commando Squadron as a commander flying the C-123 Provider over South Vietnam during the Vietnam War. The unit flew flare, communications cover, air evacuation, and search and rescue missions for downed aircraft. While he flew 298 combat missions during this period, it was his daring C-123 rescue mission on May 12, 1968 during the Battle of Kham Duc near Laos that earned him the nation's highest personal award for military valor and the only known photo capturing such actions that led to a Medal of Honor. The other three crew members (Flight examiner/co-pilot Maj. Jesse W. Campbell; Flight Engineer TSgt. Edward M. Trejo; Loadmaster SSgt. Manson L. Grubbs) of Jackson's plane also received decorations.

On January 16, 1969, President Lyndon B. Johnson presented Jackson with the Medal of Honor at a White House ceremony. Also receiving the Medal of Honor that day was fellow Newnan native Stephen W. Pless, a Marine Corps aviator who, like Jackson, had earned the decoration for an airborne rescue operation. Legend states that, upon realizing that both Pless and Jackson were from the same small Georgia town, President Johnson quipped "there must be something in the water down in Newnan."

After Vietnam, Jackson served at the Pentagon before his final assignment as Chief of Strategic Forces Studies in the Department of Military Strategy at the Air War College from May 1971 until his retirement from the Air Force on December 31, 1973 with the rank of colonel.

== Military awards ==
Jackson's decorations and awards include:

USAF Command Pilot badge
Medal of Honor		Legion of Merit
Distinguished Flying Cross	Air Medal with three bronze oak leaf clusters	Air Force Commendation Medal with bronze oak leaf cluster
Air Force Presidential Unit Citation	Air Force Outstanding Unit Award	Army Good Conduct Medal
American Defence Service Medal	American Campaign Medal	World War II Victory Medal
Army of Occupation Medal	National Defense Service Medal with service star	Korean Service Medal
Vietnam Service Medal with bronze campaign star	Air Force Longevity Service Award with one silver and two bronze oak leaf clusters	Armed Forces Reserve Medal
Small Arms Expert Marksmanship Ribbon	Republic of Korea Presidential Unit Citation	Republic of Vietnam Gallantry Cross Unit Citation
United Nations Korea Medal	Vietnam Campaign Medal	Korean War Service Medal

=== Medal of Honor citation ===
Jackson's official Medal of Honor citation for his actions at the Battle of Kham Duc reads:

For conspicuous gallantry and intrepidity in action at the risk of his life above and beyond the call of duty. Lt. Col. Jackson distinguished himself as pilot of a C-123 aircraft. Lt. Col. Jackson volunteered to attempt the rescue of a 3-man USAF Combat Control Team from the Special Forces camp at Kham Duc. Hostile forces had overrun the forward outpost and established gun positions on the airstrip. They were raking the camp with small arms, mortars, light and heavy automatic weapons, and recoilless rifle fire. The camp was engulfed in flames and ammunition dumps were continuously exploding and littering the runway with debris. In addition, eight aircraft had been destroyed by the intense enemy fire and one aircraft remained on the runway reducing its usable length to only 2,200 feet. To further complicate the landing, the weather was deteriorating rapidly, thereby permitting only one air strike prior to his landing. Although fully aware of the extreme danger and likely failure of such an attempt. Lt. Col. Jackson elected to land his aircraft and attempt to rescue. Displaying superb airmanship and extraordinary heroism, he landed his aircraft near the point where the combat control team was reported to be hiding. While on the ground, his aircraft was the target of intense hostile fire. A rocket landed in front of the nose of the aircraft but failed to explode. Once the combat control team was aboard, Lt. Col. Jackson succeeded in getting airborne despite the hostile fire directed across the runway in front of his aircraft. Lt. Col. Jackson's profound concern for his fellow men, at the risk of his life above and beyond the call of duty are in keeping with the highest traditions of the U.S. Air Force and reflect great credit upon himself, and the Armed Forces of his country.

== Later life ==
Stone marker honoring Col. Jackson outside Coweta County Courthouse, Newnan, Georgia.

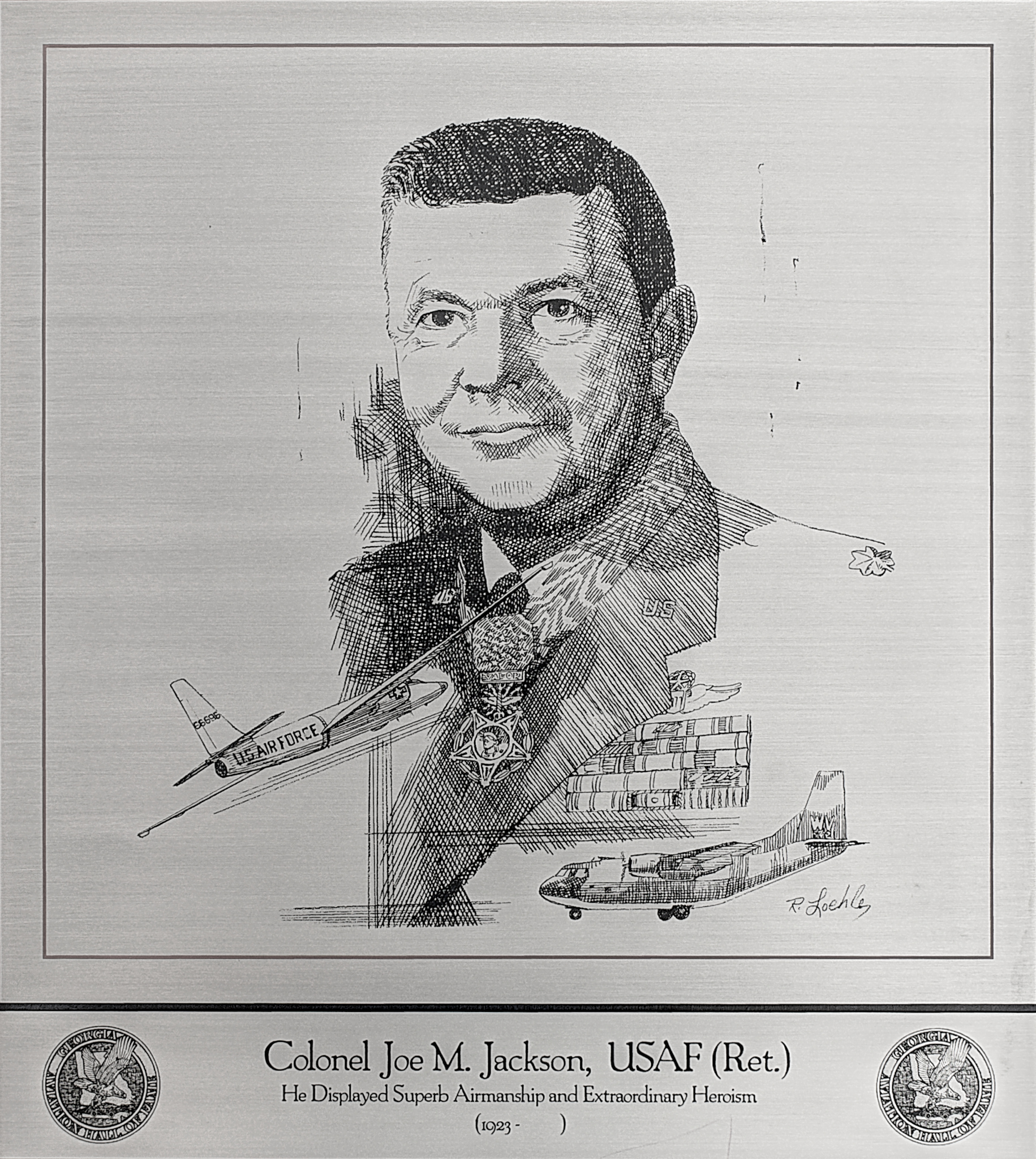
Plaque honoring Jackson at the Georgia Aviation Hall of Fame

Jackson continued to serve on active duty in the Air Force for several more years, both at the Pentagon and on the faculty of the Air War College. He eventually retired after 33 years of active duty service. He resided in the state of Washington. On May 14, 2010, NBC News highlighted his weekly contributions over 18 years to a local church that provides meals to the hungry.

In 1997, Col. Jackson was inducted into the Airlift/Tanker Association Hall of Fame. In 1998, Jackson was inducted into the Georgia Aviation Hall of Fame. A section of Georgia State Route 34 in Coweta County, Georgia is named for him.

Jackson died on January 12, 2019, at his home in Orting at the age of 95.

== See also ==
Rescue at Kham Duc

- List of Medal of Honor recipients for the Vietnam War
